= California State Route 70 =

Highway in California

State Route 70
- SR 70 highlighted in red

Route information
- Maintained by Caltrans
- Length: 178.528 mi (287.313 km) (plus about 0.5 mi (1 km) on SR 20)
- History: State highway in 1910 and 1931; became SR 24 in 1934, US 40 Alt. in 1954, and SR 70 in 1964
- Tourist routes: Feather River Scenic Byway

Major junctions
- Southwest end: SR 99 near Pleasant Grove
- SR 20 in Marysville; SR 162 in Oroville; SR 149 near Oroville; SR 89 from near Indian Falls to Blairsden
- Northeast end: US 395 at Hallelujah Junction

Location
- Country: United States
- State: California
- Counties: Sutter, Yuba, Butte, Plumas, Lassen

Highway system
- State highways in California; Interstate; US; State; Scenic; History; Pre‑1964; Unconstructed; Deleted; Freeways
← SR 68	→ SR 71

State Route 70 (SR 70) is a state highway in the U.S. state of California, connecting SR 99 north of Sacramento with U.S. Route 395 (US 395) near Beckwourth Pass (lowest in the Sierra Nevada) via the Feather River Canyon. Through the Feather River Canyon, from SR 149 to US 395, SR 70 is the Feather River Scenic Byway, a Forest Service Byway that parallels the ex-Western Pacific Railroad's Feather River Route.

The Beckwourth Trail was the earliest predecessor of SR 70, which was a spur of the California Trail. This was followed by the railroad, mostly built on the route of the trail; a dirt road was needed for construction that was later converted into part of the present state highway. Construction on the highway began in 1928, which involved the boring of three tunnels. Previously, the road was signed as U.S. Route 40 Alternate, crossing the Sierra Nevada at a lower elevation than Donner Pass on US 40, now Interstate 80 (I-80). The road was renumbered SR 70 in the 1964 state highway renumbering. Today, portions of SR 70 have been upgraded to a four-lane expressway, and even a freeway in a few locations.

== Route description ==
Route 70 is defined in section 370 of the California Streets and Highways Code. The definition omits the concurrency with Route 20 instead of duplicating that segment in the other route's definition in the code:

Route 70 is from:
(a) Route 99 near Catlett Road to Route 20 in Marysville.
(b) Route 20 in Marysville to Route 395 near Hallelujah Junction via Quincy and Beckwourth Pass.

State Route 70 begins at a partial interchange with SR 99 north of Sacramento, close to the Feather River Route rail line that parallels the entire highway, and heads north along a four-lane mix of expressway and freeway. Just north of the Bear River crossing / Yuba County line, in Plumas Lake, SR 70 becomes a freeway for the second time, which continues to just beyond the Yuba River in Marysville. Within that city, SR 70 makes two turns and overlaps SR 20 before heading north on a two-lane road, expanding to four lanes shortly thereafter. Another four-lane freeway begins south of SR 162 in Oroville, and ends at SR 149. SR 149 is a major connection northwest to SR 99, and became the straight-through movement when the construction to replace the intersection with an interchange was completed in November 2008. The State Scenic Highway portion of SR 70 begins at SR 149, which is where SR 70 turns northeast out of the Sacramento Valley and into the mountains. The short SR 191 spurs north to Paradise, while SR 70 crosses the West Branch Feather River on the double-decker West Branch Bridge, with the Feather River Route below. A short four-lane section runs over the bridge towards Jarbo Gap, where the present SR 70 merges with the old road (Dark Canyon Road) that was used before the Feather River was dammed to create Lake Oroville in the 1960s.

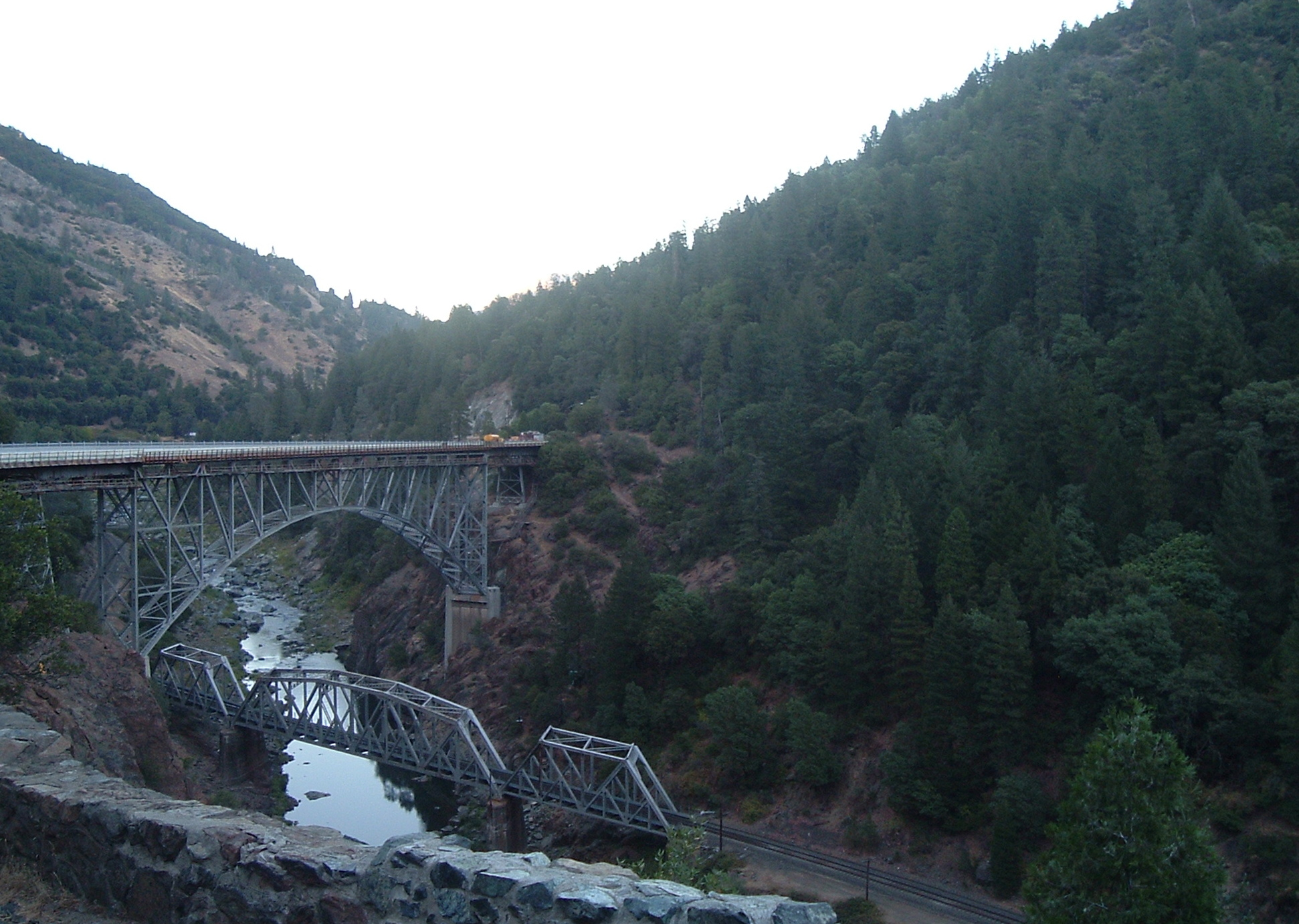
The Pulga Bridges over the Feather River Route (lower bridge) and North Fork Feather River

After crossing through Jarbo Gap, SR 70 drops down into the canyon of the North Fork Feather River, which it follows almost to Quincy, usually on the opposite side from the Feather River Route; this results in two places where both transportation lines cross the river and each other. The first of these is the Pulga Bridge, an arch bridge that crosses over a lower railroad truss bridge; soon after are the highway's three tunnels through rock formations in the canyon. After a fair distance through the canyon, and that formed by the East Branch North Fork Feather River, SR 70 reaches the junction with State Route 89 near Paxton; Routes 70 and 89 overlap southeast from that point, where the East Branch splits into Indian Creek and Spanish Creek.

The highway heads southeast, partly along the latter creek, past Keddie to Quincy in the American Valley. It leaves the valley via Greenhorn Creek, passing the Feather River Route's Williams Loop and then following the small Estray Creek to Lee Summit, which the rail line passes under in the Spring Garden Tunnel. This brings SR 70 into the valley of the Middle Fork Feather River, which takes it southeast to Blairsden, where the State Scenic Highway ends and State Route 89 splits to the south, and then east, through the Plumas National Forest, to Portola and Beckwourth. The large Sierra Valley begins at the latter community, and SR 70 heads almost directly across, passing the north end of SR 49 at Vinton and the south end of SR 284 at Chilcoot before crossing Beckwourth Pass, which the railroad takes the Chilcoot Tunnel under, and descending slightly to end at U.S. 395 at Hallelujah Junction.

The portion of SR 70 west of State Route 89 near Blairsden is also eligible for the State Scenic Highway System, but has not been designated as such by Caltrans. The entire route is part of the California Freeway and Expressway System, though it is mostly two lanes. SR 70 south of SR 149 is part of the National Highway System, a network of highways that are considered essential to the country's economy, defense, and mobility by the Federal Highway Administration. All of SR 70 is designated as the Feather River Scenic Byway, a National Forest Scenic Byway.

== History ==
=== Trails ===
James Beckwourth opened the Beckwourth Trail over Beckwourth Pass in 1851, crossing the Sierra Nevada at a lower elevation than the existing Donner Pass route of the California Trail. This split from the Truckee Route of the California Trail near Reno and roughly followed the present SR 70 to Quincy, but, rather than passing through the Feather River Canyon, it followed Oroville-Quincy Highway along ridges to Bidwell's Bar. A company was incorporated on July 23, 1855, to build the Quincy and Spanish Ranch Wagon Road, which bypassed the older trail from Quincy west to Spanish Ranch and began collecting tolls in November. The Pioneer Wagon Road, another toll road, was built in 1856 and 1857, continuing the improvements southwest to Buckeye (just before the Butte County line). An 1866 law authorized Plumas County to improve the portion from Quincy east to Beckwourth. The county also improved the road east from Beckwourth over the pass as part of the Red Clover Wagon Road, which began at Genesee and was completed in the 1870s.

The Western Pacific Railroad completed its main line into California in 1909. This followed the old Beckwourth Trail east of Quincy, but to the west it reached Oroville and Marysville via the Feather River Canyon. While building the railroad, the Utah Construction Company had created a dirt road through the canyon to assist with construction; citizens created the Plumas County Road Association in 1911 to push for improvements to this roadway and creation of a year-round route between Oroville and Quincy (the existing route over the ridges was closed for at least four months each winter). The first state highway bond issue, passed by the state's voters in 1910, included a Route 30 connecting Oroville with Quincy. Plumas County surveyor Arthur W. Keddie surveyed the Feather River Canyon route for the California Highway Commission in 1913, but the state announced in 1916 that the existing ridge route would be improved. After much debate, the state legislative road committee included the statement that this route would follow the Feather River in the 1919 amendment authorizing a third bond issue; instead of keeping it as Route 30, the Highway Commission changed the designation to an extension of the short Richvale-Oroville (now SR 162) Route 21, which was also part of the first bond issue.

=== Modern route ===
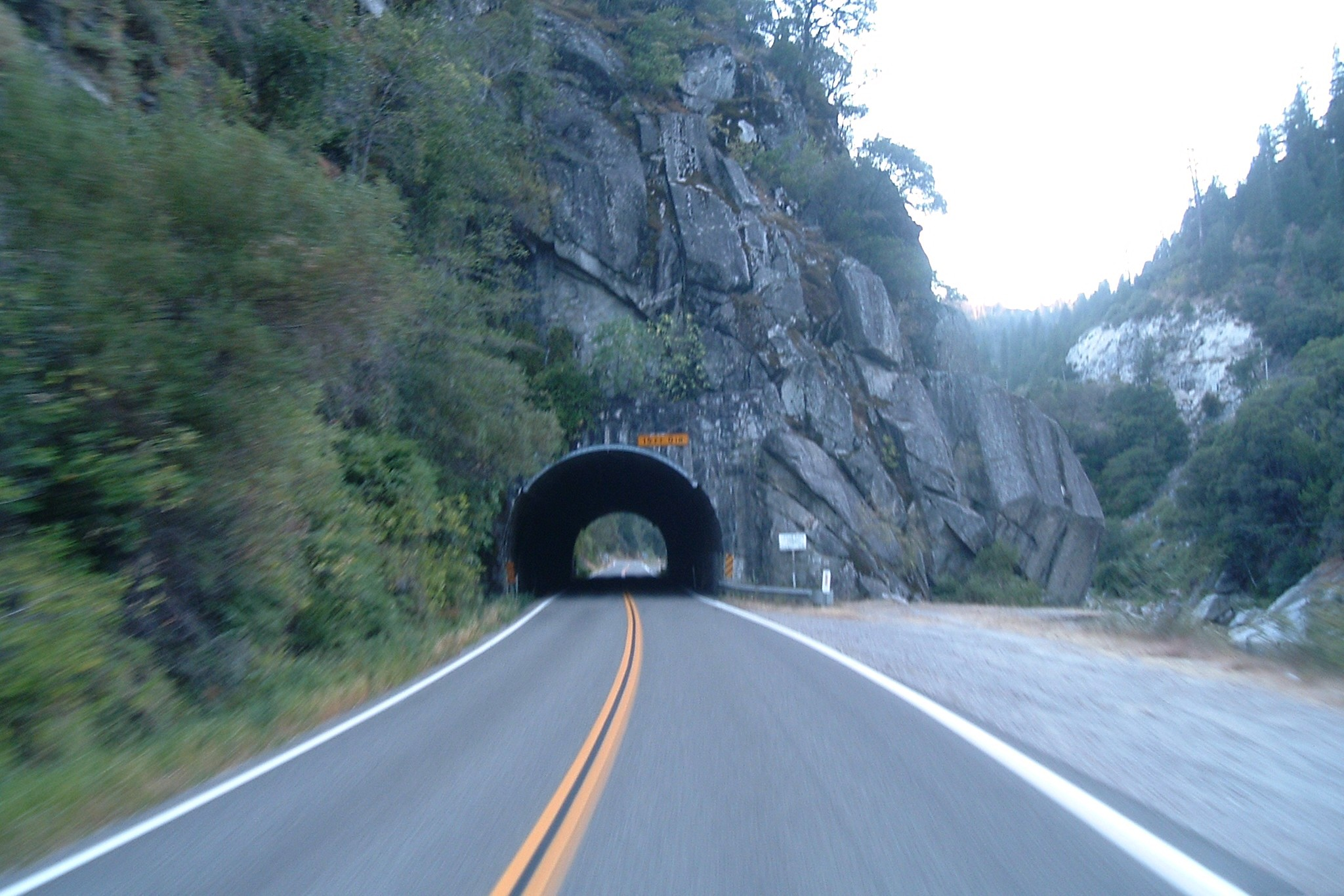
Westbound through the Arch Rock Tunnel, the westernmost of the three

Construction began on July 1, 1928, with convict labor for the easier portions and contractors for the remainder, as well as bridges and tunnels, but was slowed by the Great Depression. On the most difficult portion, between Cresta and Rock Creek, three tunnels had to be built at Arch Rock, Grizzly Dome, and Elephant Butte; at the former two, surveyors had to hang out on rope over steep granite slopes, and rockslides repeatedly caused delays. The commission dedicated the road at a ceremony at Grizzly Dome, halfway between the ends, on August 14, 1937. Construction had cost $8.15 million for 78 miles (126 km) of new road. The remainder of the old trail from Quincy to the junction with Route 29 (now U.S. 395) east of Beckwourth Pass was added to the state highway system in 1931 as an extension of Route 21, and was paved by 1936. A new Route 87 was created in 1933, stretching from Woodland via Marysville and Oroville to Route 3 (State Route 99) southeast of Chico, including the present SR 70 between Marysville and Oroville. Route 87 from Woodland to Oroville and Route 21 from Oroville to east of Beckwourth Pass became a new State Route 24 in 1934; State Route 24 was extended southwest from Woodland to Oakland by the end of 1937.

=== U.S. Route 40 Alternate ===
U.S. Route 40 Alternate
- Location: Sacramento, CA–Reno, NV
- Existed: 1954–1964

In 1954, the original part of State Route 24 was replaced by U.S. Route 40 Alternate, which continued south on U.S. 99W from Woodland to Davis and southeast on U.S. 395 to Reno, Nevada to join U.S. 40 at both ends. A direct route from Marysville south to Sacramento was added to the state highway system in 1949 as Route 232, and later became part of a rerouted State Route 24. The U.S. 40 Alternate designation was short-lived, and was mostly replaced by State Route 70 in the 1964 renumbering. Southwest of Marysville, former U.S. 40 Alternate instead became State Route 113, and SR 70 ran south along former State Route 24 (Route 232) to a point north of Sacramento, where the new State Route 99 came in from the northwest and continued south. Despite SR 70 always ending at State Route 99, it was once signed along State Route 99 (El Centro Road, Garden Highway, and the Jibboom Street Bridge) to Sacramento.

=== Modern alignments ===
When it was originally built, the Feather River Highway northeast from Oroville followed the present Oroville Dam Boulevard (County Route B2) to the present location of the Oroville Dam, and then ran north and northeast alongside the North Fork Feather River along a route now covered by Lake Oroville. It left to the north on Dark Canyon Road, meeting the present alignment at Jarbo Gap. Since the old road would be flooded, a $14.8 million new alignment, much of it four lanes, was built around the west side; the Western Pacific Railroad was also relocated to a nearby alignment. The double-decker West Branch Bridge over the West Branch Feather River northwest of the dam, carrying the highway above the rail line, was dedicated on August 15, 1962. Three portions of SR 70 have been upgraded to freeways: north of SR 99 to Berry and Kempton Roads in the early 2010s; south from Marysville to the State Route 65 split in the mid-1950s, extended farther south in the late 1960s and late 2000s; and around downtown Oroville, built in the early 1960s.

In 2004, SR 70 was upgraded to a four-lane expressway between Feather River Boulevard north of the Bear River and the Yuba/Sutter county line to the freeway portion south of McGowan Parkway. A freeway interchange was constructed in 2008 at Plumas Lake Boulevard for access to the Plumas Lake development previously served at an uncontrolled intersection with Plumas Arboga Road. The removal of this intersection effectively upgraded the expressway portion to freeway south to the Feather River Boulevard intersection. In the early 2010s, the last two-lane segment of SR 70 south of Marysville was expanded to a four-lane expressway, with a freeway section bypassing the small town of East Nicolaus to the west. In 2015, the interchange with Feather River Boulevard in Plumas Lake was opened to traffic, eliminating the last signalized intersection between Sacramento (with SR 99) and Marysville.

In 2023, one of the last stretches of two-lane highway of SR 70, between East Gridley Road and just north of Laurellen Road, was widened to a four-lane expressway, with a center left-turn lane and eight foot wide shoulders on each side. The project was completed in September of that year. The portions between SR 162 and East Gridley Road were completed in the early 2010s to the early 2020s.

=== Future ===
The last two-lane section of SR 70 between Marysville and Oroville, which involves the portion between 14th Street in Marysville and Laurellen Road just north of Marysville was approved to be expanded into four lanes, with a center left-turn lane. It will involve expanding the narrow roadway under two railroad overcrossings and the relocation of a levee. The project is on hold as the city of Marysville is in a lawsuit with Caltrans over the increased traffic through the city. Once the project is completed, SR 70 will become a continuous four-lane highway from its start at SR 99 all the way to SR 191 south of Paradise, even though traffic will still have to navigate through the center of Marysville.

== Major intersections ==
Except where prefixed with a letter, postmiles were measured on the road as it was in 1964, based on primarily a south-to-north alignment (especially the freeway segment between State Route 99 and State Route 149), and do not necessarily reflect current mileage. Postmile prefixes include: R reflecting a realignment in the route since then, M indicating a second realignment, L referring to an overlap due to a correction or change, and T indicating postmiles classified as temporary. Segments that remain unconstructed or have been relinquished to local control may be omitted. The numbers reset at county lines; the start and end postmiles in each county are given in the county column.

County	Location	Postmile	Exit	Destinations	Notes
Sutter; SUT R0.05-8.30		R0.05		SR 99 south – Sacramento	Interchange; southbound exit and northbound entrance; southwestern terminus of SR 70; SR 99 north exit 319
Sutter; SUT R0.05-8.30		M1.00		Striplin Road to SR 99 north – Yuba City	
Sutter; SUT R0.05-8.30		1.18	South end of freeway		
Sutter; SUT R0.05-8.30	East Nicolaus	M3.99	4	Nicolaus Avenue	
Sutter; SUT R0.05-8.30		6.82	North end of freeway		
Sutter; SUT R0.05-8.30		7.09	South end of freeway		
Yuba; YUB 0.00-25.82	Plumas Lake	R0.35	9	Feather River Boulevard	
Yuba; YUB 0.00-25.82	Plumas Lake	R3.47	12	Plumas Lake Boulevard	
Yuba; YUB 0.00-25.82	Olivehurst	R7.35	16	McGowan Parkway	
Yuba; YUB 0.00-25.82	Olivehurst	R8.29	17	SR 65 south – Roseville	Southbound left exit and northbound entrance; northern terminus of SR 65; former US 99E south
Yuba; YUB 0.00-25.82	Olivehurst	R9.28	18A	Olivehurst (Olivehurst Avenue)	
Yuba; YUB 0.00-25.82	Linda	R10.16	18B	Erle Road	
Yuba; YUB 0.00-25.82	Linda	R11.39 13.01	20A	Feather River Boulevard	Serves Beale AFB, Yuba College (northbound only)
Yuba; YUB 0.00-25.82	Linda	13.23	20B	North Beale Road	No southbound entrance; serves Beale AFB, Yuba College
Yuba; YUB 0.00-25.82	Marysville	14.08	—	1st Street, F Street	Southbound entrance only
Yuba; YUB 0.00-25.82	Marysville	14.25	North end of freeway		
Yuba; YUB 0.00-25.82	Marysville	14.70 0.99 (Note: Indicates that the postmile represents the distance along SR 20 rather than SR 70.)		SR 20 west (E Street) / 9th Street – Yuba City	South end of SR 20 overlap; former US 40 Alt. west / US 99E north
Yuba; YUB 0.00-25.82	Marysville	1.47 14.71		SR 20 east (12th Street) – Grass Valley	North end of SR 20 overlap
Butte; BUT 0.00-48.08		12.65	South end of freeway		
Butte; BUT 0.00-48.08	Oroville	13.90	46	SR 162 (Oroville Dam Boulevard, SR 70 Bus. east) – Richvale	
Butte; BUT 0.00-48.08	Oroville	14.61	47	Montgomery Street (CR B2)	Western terminus of CR B2
Butte; BUT 0.00-48.08	Oroville	15.43– 15.72	48	Grand Avenue, Nelson Avenue (SR 70 Bus. west)	
Butte; BUT 0.00-48.08	Oroville	16.63	49	Garden Drive	
Butte; BUT 0.00-48.08	Wicks Corner	20.48	—	SR 149 north to SR 99 – Chico, Red Bluff	Southern terminus of SR 149
Butte; BUT 0.00-48.08		R21.22	North end of freeway		
Butte; BUT 0.00-48.08		21.87		SR 191 north (Clark Road) / Table Mountain Boulevard – Paradise	Southern terminus of SR 191
Butte; BUT 0.00-48.08		28.22	West Branch Bridge over West Branch Feather River		
Butte; BUT 0.00-48.08		40.99	Pulga Bridge over North Fork Feather River		
Butte; BUT 0.00-48.08		47.15	Arch Rock Tunnel		
Plumas; PLU 0.00-95.96		0.77	Grizzly Dome Tunnel		
Plumas; PLU 0.00-95.96		0.99	Elephant Butte Tunnel		
Plumas; PLU 0.00-95.96		6.99	Tobin Bridge over North Fork Feather River		
Plumas; PLU 0.00-95.96		33.00	Weigh station (westbound only)		
Plumas; PLU 0.00-95.96		33.03		SR 89 north – Greenville, Lake Almanor	West end of SR 89 overlap
Plumas; PLU 0.00-95.96		49.80	Massack Rest Area		
Plumas; PLU 0.00-95.96	Blairsden	R66.63		SR 89 south – Truckee	East end of SR 89 overlap
Plumas; PLU 0.00-95.96	Portola	75.96		CR A15 (Gulling Street)	Northern terminus of CR A15
Plumas; PLU 0.00-95.96		R79.10	Davis Rest Area		
Plumas; PLU 0.00-95.96	Beckwourth	R80.32		CR A23 (Beckwourth-Calpine Road) – Calpine	Northern terminus of CR A23
Plumas; PLU 0.00-95.96		83.17		CR A24 (Beckwourth-Loyalton Road)	Northern terminus of CR A24
Plumas; PLU 0.00-95.96	Vinton	92.07		SR 49 south – Loyalton	Northern terminus of SR 49
Plumas; PLU 0.00-95.96	Chilcoot	94.28		SR 284 (Frenchman Lake Road) / Patterson Street – Frenchman Lake Recreation Area	Southern terminus of SR 284
Plumas; PLU 0.00-95.96		95.76	Beckwourth Pass, elevation 5,212 feet (1,589 m)		
Lassen; LAS 0.00-3.89	Hallelujah Junction	3.89		US 395 – Reno, Susanville	Interchange; northeastern terminus of SR 70; US 395 exit 8; former US 40 Alt. east
1.000 mi = 1.609 km; 1.000 km = 0.621 mi: Concurrency terminus; Incomplete access

== Business route ==
State Route 70 Business
- Location: Oroville

State Route 70 Business (SR 70 Bus.) is a business route of California State Route 70 in Oroville. It provides access to downtown Oroville, following Oroville Dam Boulevard (SR 162), Myers Street, Montgomery Street (CR B2), Table Mountain Boulevard, and Nelson Avenue.

Major intersections

The entire route is in Oroville, Butte County.

mi	km	Destinations	Notes
0.0	0.0	SR 162 west (Oroville Dam Boulevard west) – Willows	Continuation beyond SR 70
0.0	0.0	SR 70 – Marysville, Quincy	Interchange; southern terminus; south end of SR 162 overlap; SR 70 exit 46
1.5	2.4	SR 162 east (Oroville Dam Boulevard east) / Myers Street south – Lake Oroville	North end of SR 162 overlap
2.2	3.5	Montgomery Street west (CR B2 west) / Myers Street north	South end of CR B2 overlap; Montgomery Street is former US 40 Alt. west
2.6	4.2	Montgomery Street east (CR B2 east) / Washington Avenue	Montgomery Street Roundabout; north end of CR B2 overlap
3.4	5.5	Table Mountain Boulevard, Cherokee Road	Table Mountain Roundabout; Table Mountain Boulevard is former US 40 Alt. east
4.2	6.8	SR 70 north / 3rd Street – Chico, Quincy	Interchange; northern terminus; SR 70 exit 48; connects to SR 149
4.2	6.8	4th Street to SR 70 south – Marysville	
4.2	6.8	Nelson Avenue west	Continuation beyond SR 70
1.000 mi = 1.609 km; 1.000 km = 0.621 mi: Concurrency terminus
