= Beckwourth, California =

Beckwourth
- Unincorporated Community; Census Designated Place
- Location in Plumas County and the state of California

- Location in the United States
- Coordinates: 39°49′39″N 120°24′13″W
- Country: United States
- State: California
- County: Plumas

Area
  - Total: 11.69 sq mi (30.27 km^{2})
  - Land: 11.68 sq mi (30.26 km^{2})
  - Water: 0.0039 sq mi (0.01 km^{2}) 0.04%
- Elevation: 4,911 ft (1,497 m)

Population (2020)
  - Total: 478
  - Density: 41/sq mi (15.8/km^{2})
- Time zone: UTC-8 (Pacific (PST))
  - Summer (DST): UTC-7 (PDT)
- ZIP code: 96129
- Area codes: 530, 837
- FIPS code: 06-04772
- GNIS feature IDs: 1658022; 2407819

Beckwourth (formerly, Beckwith and Beekwith) is a census-designated place (CDP) in Plumas County, California, United States. At the 2020 census the population was 478.

Beckwourth is located in the Sierra Valley, 5 miles (8.0 km) east of Portola, near the head-waters of the Middle Fork of the Feather River.

== Name ==
The community was named for James P. Beckwourth, an explorer, mountain man, fur trader, and business man, who discovered Beckwourth Pass in 1851.

== History ==
The Beckwith post office opened in 1870 and changed its name to Beckwourth in 1932.

== Geography ==
Beckwourth is located at 39°49′39″N 120°24′13″W (39.827528, -120.403710).

According to the United States Census Bureau, the CDP has a total area of 11.7 square miles (30 km^{2}), of which 99.96% is land and 0.04% is water.

Nervino Airport (FAA identifier: O02 or oscar-zero-two) is plotted three-quarters of a mile east of Beckwourth along State Route 70 on the Reconnaissance Peak, California 7.5 minute quadrangle. It has a 4,600-foot (1,400 m) runway and is located at 39°49′05″N 120°21′20″W. The US Geological Survey says variant names for the airport are Beckwourth Airport and Plumas County Airport.

State facilities in the town include a State of California, Department of Water Resources maintenance yard and a Caltrans Maintenance Station. These appear to be colocated (at the same site).

=== Climate ===
This region experiences warm (but not hot) and dry summers, with no average monthly temperatures above 71.6 °F. According to the Köppen Climate Classification system, Beckwourth has a warm-summer Mediterranean climate, abbreviated "Csb" on climate maps.

== Demographics ==
Historical population
Census	Pop.	Note	%±
2000	342		—
2010	432		26.3%
2020	478		10.6%
U.S. Decennial Census; 1850–1870 1880-1890; 1900 1910 1920; 1930 1940 1950; 1960 1970 1980; 1990 2000 2010

Beckwourth first appeared as a census designated place in the 2000 U.S. census.

=== Racial and ethnic composition ===
Beckwourth CDP, California – Racial and ethnic composition Note: the US Census treats Hispanic/Latino as an ethnic category. This table excludes Latinos from the racial categories and assigns them to a separate category. Hispanics/Latinos may be of any race.
Race / Ethnicity (NH = Non-Hispanic)	Pop 2000	Pop 2010	Pop 2020	% 2000	% 2010	% 2020
White alone (NH)	315	387	411	92.11%	89.58%	85.98%
Black or African American alone (NH)	0	0	4	0.00%	0.00%	0.84%
Native American or Alaska Native alone (NH)	6	8	1	1.75%	1.85%	0.21%
Asian alone (NH)	0	2	2	0.00%	0.46%	0.42%
Native Hawaiian or Pacific Islander alone (NH)	3	1	2	0.88%	0.23%	0.42%
Other race alone (NH)	2	0	1	0.58%	0.00%	0.21%
Mixed race or Multiracial (NH)	6	5	18	1.75%	1.16%	3.77%
Hispanic or Latino (any race)	10	29	39	2.92%	6.71%	8.16%
Total	342	432	478	100.00%	100.00%	100.00%

=== 2020 census ===
As of the 2020 census, Beckwourth had a population of 478. The population density was 40.9 inhabitants per square mile (15.8/km^{2}). 0.0% of residents lived in urban areas, while 100.0% lived in rural areas.

The median age was 59.4 years. 12.8% of residents were under the age of 18, 4.4% aged 18 to 24, 15.1% aged 25 to 44, 34.5% aged 45 to 64, and 33.3% who were 65 years of age or older. For every 100 females, there were 98.3 males, and for every 100 females age 18 and over there were 103.4 males age 18 and over.

The whole population lived in households. There were 228 households, of which 15.4% had children under the age of 18 living in them. Of all households, 53.1% were married-couple households, 4.4% were cohabiting couple households, 28.9% were households with a male householder and no spouse or partner present, and 13.6% were households with a female householder and no spouse or partner present. About 28.5% of all households were made up of individuals and 10.5% had someone living alone who was 65 years of age or older. The average household size was 2.1. There were 148 families (64.9% of all households).

There were 360 housing units at an average density of 30.8 units per square mile (11.9 units/km^{2}), of which 228 (63.3%) were occupied. The homeowner vacancy rate was 6.9% and the rental vacancy rate was 30.4%. Of the occupied units, 88.6% were owner-occupied, and 11.4% were occupied by renters.

== Politics ==
In the state legislature Beckwourth is located in the 1st senatorial district, represented by Republican Megan Dahle, and the 1st Assembly district, represented by Republican Heather Hadwick.

Federally, Beckwourth is in California's 3rd congressional district, represented by Independent Kevin Kiley.

== Education ==
The school district is Plumas Unified School District.

== See also ==
- Beckwourth Pass
- State Route 70
- Hallelujah Junction, California
- Loyalton, California
- Plumas National Forest
- Portola, California
- Vinton, California

== Notable people ==
- Jim Beckwourth, mountain man, fur trader, and explorer
- Alice Marble, a World Number One American tennis player who won 18 Grand Slam championships
