= Pulga Bridges =

Coordinates: 39°47′41″N 121°27′07″W

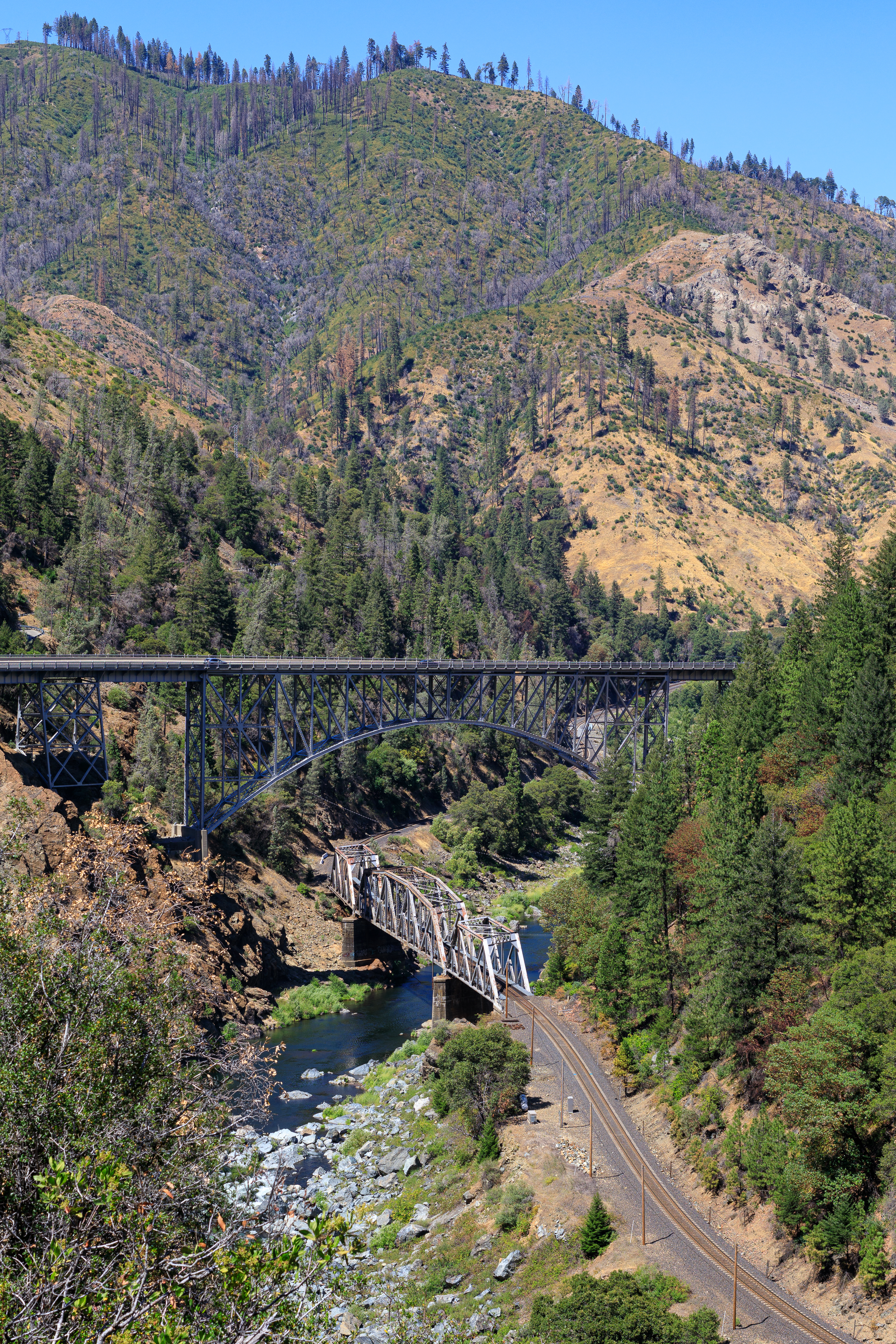
Pulga Bridges

The Pulga Bridges are two nearby bridges in Butte County, California for highway and railroad crossings of the North Fork Feather River. The steel arch highway bridge, carrying State Route 70, crosses over the railroad bridge.

The railroad Pulga Bridge, a three-span through-truss bridge, is on the Union Pacific Railroad's (originally Western Pacific Railroad's) Feather River Route through the Sierra Nevada in northeastern California, connecting the Sacramento Valley to Salt Lake City via the Feather River valley. The bridge is part of the WP's eastward climb to its summit at Beckwourth Pass while maintaining the railroad's overall 1.0 percent (compensated) grade, making it the easiest railroad route over the Sierra Nevada.

== Railfanning ==
Although located in Butte County, the Pulga Bridges Loop is an additional part of Plumas County's "7 Wonders of the Railroad World" and access is described in its travel guide.

== See also ==
Tobin Bridges - similar bridge pair nearby
