= California State Route 149 =

Highway in California

State Route 149

- SR 149 highlighted in red

Route information
- Maintained by Caltrans
- Length: 4.623 mi (7.440 km)
- History: State highway in 1933; numbered in 1964

Major junctions
- South end: SR 70 near Oroville
- North end: SR 99 near Chico

Location
- Country: United States
- State: California
- Counties: Butte

Highway system
- State highways in California; Interstate; US; State; Scenic; History; Pre‑1964; Unconstructed; Deleted; Freeways
← SR 147	→ SR 150

State Route 149 (SR 149) is a short state highway in the U.S. state of California that helps to connect Oroville and Chico through rural Butte County. Connecting State Route 70 at Wicks Corner with State Route 99 east of Durham, it forms part of the primary north–south highway through the eastern Sacramento Valley, a Focus Route of the Interregional Road System.

SR 149 was formerly part of the Oroville-Chico Highway; the majority of the latter was merged into other routes. In the mid-1970s, the highway was reallocated onto a newer two-lane alignment. A project to widen the two-lane road to a four-lane expressway was completed in late 2008, removing the bottleneck from the Oroville-Chico highway.

== Route description ==
Route 149 is defined in section 449 of the California Streets and Highways Code, and that the highway is "from Route 70 near Wicks Corner to Route 99 south of Chico".

A roadside view of State Route 149 in Openshaw Road

State Route 149 begins at Wicks Corner as a divided highway, at an interchange with SR 70 several miles north of Oroville. This is the north end of the State Route 70 freeway, which passes through a gap between the Campbell Hills and South Table Mountain on its way from Oroville. SR 149 heads northwest across gently rolling terrain before descending into the valley of the Dry Creek. As it begins to climb out of the valley, SR 149 ends at an interchange with SR 99. The latter highway continues the corridor northwest to Chico, quickly dropping back into the Butte Creek valley. The route is a divided highway with four lanes.

SR 149 is part of the California Freeway and Expressway System, and is part of the National Highway System, a network of highways that are considered essential to the country's economy, defense, and mobility by the Federal Highway Administration.

== History ==
By the late 1910s, a "natural prairie road" linked Oroville to State Highway Route 3 southeast of Chico, following the present Table Mountain Boulevard, Openshaw Road, and Oroville-Chico Highway to Midway (Route 3). The primary route between these two cities was the all-state highway route, following Route 21 (now SR 162) west from Oroville to Route 3 near Richvale. Butte County dedicated a newly improved Oroville-Chico Highway on July 4, 1926; it became part of the state highway system in 1933 as the northern portion of the Woodland-Chico Route 87. (The rest of Route 87 became part of Sign Route 24, which turned east at Oroville along present State Route 70, in 1934.)

In the 1950s and 1960s, about three-quarters of the Oroville-Chico Highway was absorbed by other routes. A new two-lane alignment of U.S. Route 99E (Legislative Route 3, now SR 99) between east of Richvale and Chico opened in the mid-1950s, using part of the Oroville-Chico Highway south of Durham Dayton Highway and bypassing the remainder to the junction south of Chico. In the early 1960s, U.S. Route 40 Alternate (Legislative Route 21, now SR 70) was relocated due to the damming of Lake Oroville across its old alignment. The bridge over the West Branch Feather River northwest of the dam opened in August 1962, resulting in US 40 Alt. using the Oroville-Chico Highway (which was relocated to a new four-lane freeway alignment) south of Wicks Corner. The remainder, which was never part of a sign route, became Route 149 in the 1964 renumbering.

SR 149 was relocated onto a new two-lane alignment in the mid-1970s, leaving behind Openshaw Road. Caltrans began studies for interchanges at each end in September 1992. The California Transportation Commission approved funding for four-laning SR 149 in April 1994 and the two interchanges in May 1996, with construction to begin in 1998 and cost $47 million. Due to state budget problems and the need to study environmental impacts, the project was repeatedly pushed back; these impacts and inflation had more than doubled the cost to $120 million in 2004. In particular, an endangered species of meadowfoam was discovered on the south embankment, forcing a redesign. Construction began in September 2005 on a new freshwater marsh near the State Route 70 intersection to replace beaver ponds in the path of the highway, and it was completed in March 2006.

Ground was broken for the highway project in April 2006, with major construction beginning in May. Caltrans estimated completion in late 2009 for the completion of the four-lane expressway, including a new directional interchange at each end, at which State Route 70 and State Route 99 will exit and enter to the right of the main Oroville-Chico movement. Most access was closed, with Shippee Road providing the sole at-grade crossing of the expressway, and an overcrossing near State Route 70 giving access to local property. Shippee Road was relocated to the southeast, allowing for the future construction of an interchange. In addition, State Route 70 was relocated to the west between SR 149 and State Route 191, and local access on State Route 99 between SR 149 and the Durham Dayton Highway interchange was replaced by frontage roads. The entire project was completed in November 2008, at a cost of $125 million.

== Major intersections ==
Except where prefixed with a letter, postmiles were measured on the road as it was in 1964, based on the alignment that existed at the time, and do not necessarily reflect current mileage. Postmile prefixes include: R reflecting a realignment in the route since then, M indicating a second realignment, L referring to an overlap due to a correction or change, and T indicating postmiles classified as temporary. Segments that remain unconstructed or have been relinquished to local control may be omitted. The entire route is in Butte County.

Location	Postmile	Destinations	Notes
Wicks Corner	0.00	SR 70 to SR 191 – Paradise, Quincy, Oroville, Marysville	Southbound exit and northbound entrance; west end of SR 149
		North end of freeway	
	R3.11	Shippee Road, Openshaw Road	
	R4.62	SR 99 – Yuba City, Chico, Red Bluff	Interchange; northbound exit and southbound entrance; east end of SR 149
1.000 mi = 1.609 km; 1.000 km = 0.621 mi
