= Toyota Amphitheatre =

Concert venue in Wheatland, California, United States

Coordinates: 39.031719°N 121.512694°W

- Interactive map of Toyota Amphitheatre
- Former names: Sacramento Valley Amphitheatre (2000-01); AutoWest Amphitheatre (2002); Sleep Train Amphitheatre (2003-15)
- Address: 2677 Forty Mile Road; Wheatland, CA 95692-8800
- Location: Sacramento Valley
- Owner: Live Nation Entertainment
- Capacity: 18,500

Construction
- Groundbreaking: September 1999
- Opened: June 10, 2000
- Cost: $25 million ($48.3 million in 2025 dollars)
- Architect: Heller Manus Architects
- General contractor: DPR Construction

The Toyota Amphitheatre is an outdoor amphitheater in unincorporated Yuba County, California, United States. It lies in-between Plumas Lake and Wheatland; 35 miles (56 km) north of Sacramento and 10 mi (16 km) south of Marysville. It holds 18,500 spectators and is primarily used for rock and country concerts.

== History ==
The outdoor venue is a $25 million concert facility serving the greater Sacramento Valley and all of northern California.

It was constructed and opened in 2000 as a 20,000 capacity amphitheatre on 90 acres (36 ha) in Yuba County. Measure R, the public initiative that allowed the amphitheatre to be built passed with 85% of the vote in 1999. Original plans featured sharing the location with a NASCAR-style racetrack, the Yuba County Motorplex. Due to concerns capacity was reduced to 18,500 pending completion of a highway off-ramp on nearby State Route 70. The seating is divided between fixed (approximately 8,000) stadium-style seats and the balance (approximately 10,500) open lawn seating. The lower fixed seating area is divided into three primary seating sections, often referred to as the 100, 200 and Pit sections.

The project was led by Bill Graham Presents and SFX Entertainment. When finished, it featured several notable improvements on the Shoreline model including removable seats in the "pit" area, improved sight lines, and high sound quality. It opened in June 2000 with a sold-out concert featuring Stone Temple Pilots and Papa Roach. Since then, the amphitheatre has featured more than 100 concerts and more than 2 million customers.

=== Naming history ===
- Sacramento Valley Amphitheatre (June 2000—December 2002)
- AutoWest Amphitheatre (January—December 2002)
- Sleep Train Amphitheatre (January 2003—May 2015)
- Toyota Amphitheatre (May 23, 2015—present)

== Noted performers ==
- 3 Doors Down
- Aaron Carter
- Aerosmith
- B.B. King
- Backstreet Boys
- Barenaked Ladies
- Big Time Rush
- Blink-182
- Cake
- Coldplay
- Counting Crows
- Creed
- The Cure
- Dave Matthews Band
- Def Leppard
- Depeche Mode
- The Doobie Brothers
- Earth, Wind & Fire
- Fall Out Boy
- Finger Eleven
- Godsmack
- Lil Uzi Vert
- Iron Maiden
- Jimmy Page
- John Mellencamp
- Journey
- Judas Priest
- Keith Urban
- Kid Rock
- Kiss
- Linkin Park
- Matchbox Twenty
- Mötley Crüe
- Nickelback
- No Doubt
- OneRepublic
- 5 Seconds of Summer
- Pearl Jam
- Poison
- Post Malone
- Red Hot Chili Peppers
- Rush
- Sammy Hagar
- Santana
- $uicide boy$
- Ski Mask the Slump God
- Smashing Pumpkins
- Steely Dan
- Sting
- Tears for Fears
- The Who
- Third Eye Blind
- Thirty Seconds to Mars
- Thomas Rhett
- Tim McGraw
- Tom Petty and the Heartbreakers
- Tool
- Volbeat
- Whitesnake

== See also ==
- Live Nation
