= South Table Mountain =

The following hills and mountains are named South Table Mountain:

- South Table Mountain (California) in Butte County, on California State Route 149
- South Table Mountain (Colorado) in Jefferson County
