= Tobin Bridges =

Transportation infrastructure in California

Coordinates: 39°56′12″N 121°18′57″W

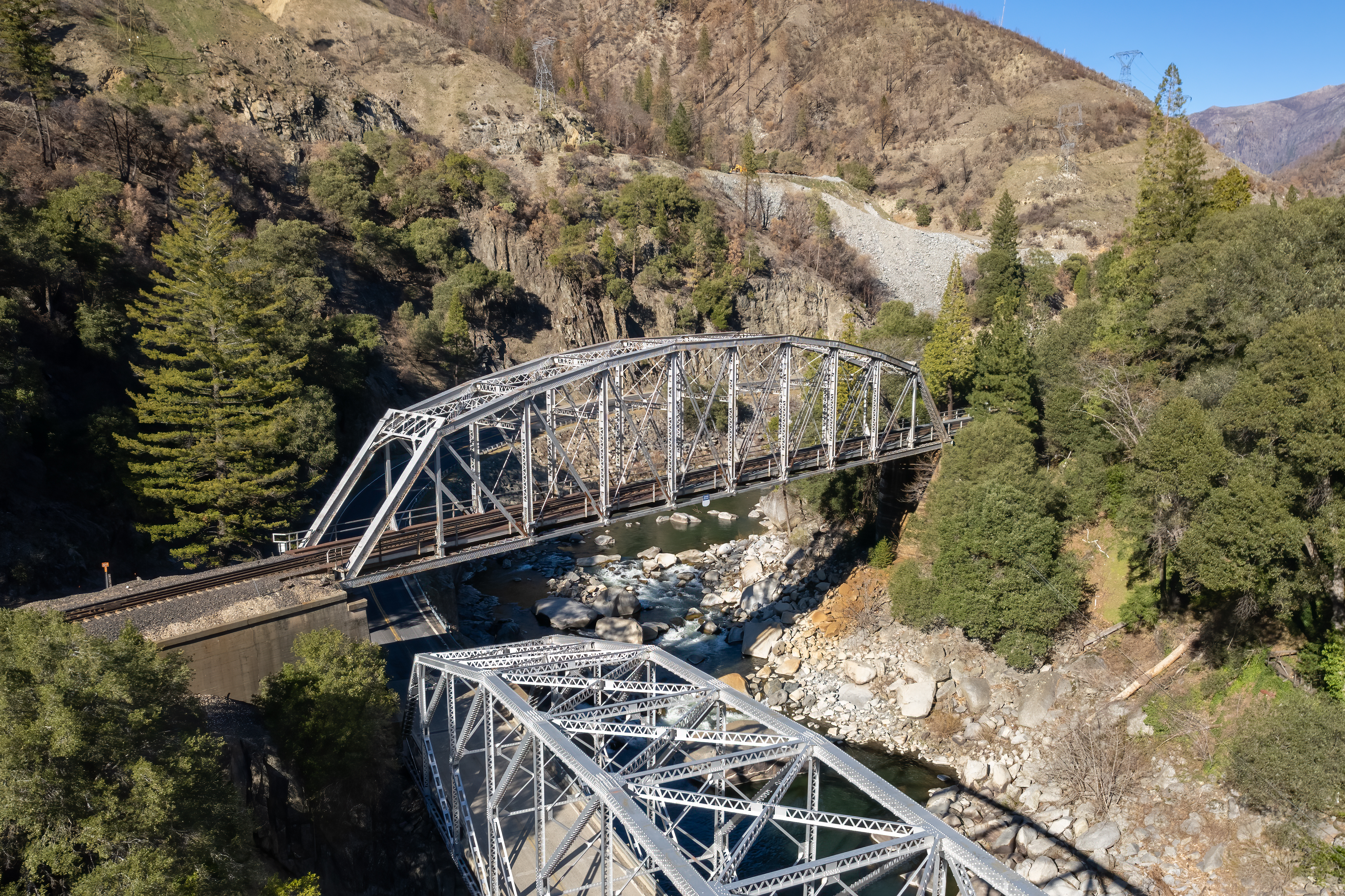
Tobin Bridges in February 2022

The Tobin Bridges are two bridges in Plumas County for highway and railroad crossings of the North Fork Feather River that nearly cross at the west side of the river. The railroad bridge also crosses over Highway 70.

The railroad Tobin Bridge is located on the Union Pacific Railroad's (originally Western Pacific Railroad's) Feather River Route through the Sierra Nevada in northeastern California, connecting the Sacramento Valley to Salt Lake City via the Feather River valley. The bridge is part of WP's eastward climb to its summit at Beckwourth Pass while maintaining the railroad's overall 1.0 percent (compensated) grade, the least steep of any mountain grade on a transcontinental railroad.

== Railfanning ==
The Tobin Bridges are an extended part of Plumas County's "7 Wonders of the Railroad World" and access is described in its travel guide.

== See also ==
- Pulga Bridges - similar bridge pair nearby
- List of bridges documented by the Historic American Engineering Record in California
