= Spring Garden, California =

Spring Garden
- Unincorporated Community; Census Designated Place
- Location in Plumas County and the state of California

- Location in the United States
- Coordinates: 39°54′25″N 120°47′49″W
- Country: United States
- State: California
- County: Plumas

Area
  - Total: 0.654 sq mi (1.693 km^{2})
  - Land: 0.654 sq mi (1.693 km^{2})
  - Water: 0 sq mi (0 km^{2}) 0%
- Elevation: 3,999 ft (1,219 m)

Population (2020)
  - Total: 19
  - Density: 29/sq mi (11/km^{2})
- Time zone: UTC-8 (Pacific (PST))
  - Summer (DST): UTC-7 (PDT)
- ZIP code: 95971
- Area code: 530
- FIPS code: 06-73654
- GNIS feature ID: 1659845

Spring Garden is a census-designated place (CDP) in Plumas County, California, United States. The population was 19 at the 2020 census, up from 16 at the 2010 census.

The Spring Garden Tunnel is located southeast of Spring Garden. Williams Loop is located northwest of Spring Garden.

== Geography ==
Spring Garden is located at 39°54′25″N 120°47′49″W.

According to the United States Census Bureau, the CDP has a total area of 0.7 square miles (1.8 km^{2}), all land.

== Demographics ==
Historical population
Census	Pop.	Note	%±
2000	55		—
2010	16		−70.9%
2020	19		18.8%
U.S. Decennial Census; 1860–1870 1880-1890; 1900 1910 1920; 1930 1940 1950; 1960 1970 1980; 1990 2000 2010

Spring Garden first appeared as a census designated place in the 2000 U.S. census.

=== 2020 ===
Spring Garden CDP, California – Racial and ethnic composition Note: the US Census treats Hispanic/Latino as an ethnic category. This table excludes Latinos from the racial categories and assigns them to a separate category. Hispanics/Latinos may be of any race.
Race / Ethnicity (NH = Non-Hispanic)	Pop 2000	Pop 2010	Pop 2020	% 2000	% 2010	% 2020
White alone (NH)	53	15	9	96.36%	93.75%	47.37%
Black or African American alone (NH)	0	0	0	0.00%	0.00%	0.00%
Native American or Alaska Native alone (NH)	0	0	0	0.00%	0.00%	0.00%
Asian alone (NH)	0	1	0	0.00%	6.25%	0.00%
Native Hawaiian or Pacific Islander alone (NH)	0	0	0	0.00%	0.00%	0.00%
Other race alone (NH)	0	0	0	0.00%	0.00%	0.00%
Mixed race or Multiracial (NH)	0	0	6	0.00%	0.00%	31.58%
Hispanic or Latino (any race)	2	0	4	3.64%	0.00%	21.05%
Total	55	16	19	100.00%	100.00%	100.00%

=== 2010 ===
At the 2010 census Spring Garden had a population of 16. The population density was 24.5 people per square mile (9.5/km^{2}). The racial makeup of Spring Garden was 15 (93.8%) White, 0 (0.0%) African American, 0 (0.0%) Native American, 1 (6.3%) Asian, 0 (0.0%) Pacific Islander, 0 (0.0%) from other races, and 0 (0.0%) from two or more races. Hispanic or Latino of any race were 0 people (0.0%).

The whole population lived in households, no one lived in non-institutionalized group quarters and no one was institutionalized.

There were 9 households, 1 (11.1%) had children under the age of 18 living in them, 5 (55.6%) were opposite-sex married couples living together, 0 (0%) had a female householder with no husband present, 1 (11.1%) had a male householder with no wife present. There were 0 (0%) unmarried opposite-sex partnerships, and 0 (0%) same-sex married couples or partnerships. 3 households (33.3%) were one person and 0 (0%) had someone living alone who was 65 or older. The average household size was 1.78. There were 6 families (66.7% of households); the average family size was 2.17.

The age distribution was 1 people (6.3%) under the age of 18, 1 people (6.3%) aged 18 to 24, 1 people (6.3%) aged 25 to 44, 7 people (43.8%) aged 45 to 64, and 6 people (37.5%) who were 65 or older. The median age was 57.5 years. For every 100 females, there were 128.6 males. For every 100 females age 18 and over, there were 150.0 males.

There were 11 housing units at an average density of 16.9 per square mile, of the occupied units 7 (77.8%) were owner-occupied and 2 (22.2%) were rented. The homeowner vacancy rate was 0%; the rental vacancy rate was 0%. 14 people (87.5% of the population) lived in owner-occupied housing units and 2 people (12.5%) lived in rental housing units.

=== 2000 ===
At the 2000 census there were 55 people, 23 households, and 14 families in the CDP. The population density was 85.3 inhabitants per square mile (32.9/km^{2}). There were 26 housing units at an average density of 40.3 per square mile (15.6/km^{2}). The racial makeup of the CDP was 100.00% White. Hispanic or Latino of any race were 3.64%.

Of the 23 households 17.4% had children under the age of 18 living with them, 47.8% were married couples living together, 8.7% had a female householder with no husband present, and 39.1% were non-families. 34.8% of households were one person and 13.0% were one person aged 65 or older. The average household size was 2.39 and the average family size was 2.93.

The age distribution was 23.6% under the age of 18, 3.6% from 18 to 24, 18.2% from 25 to 44, 43.6% from 45 to 64, and 10.9% 65 or older. The median age was 46 years. For every 100 females, there were 96.4 males. For every 100 females age 18 and over, there were 133.3 males.

The median household income was $30,179 and the median family income was $30,179. Males had a median income of $0 versus $21,250 for females. The per capita income for the CDP was $12,062. None of the population and none of the families were below the poverty line.

== Politics ==
In the state legislature, Spring Garden is in the 1st senatorial district, represented by Republican Megan Dahle, and the 1st Assembly district, represented by Republican Heather Hadwick.

Federally, Spring Garden is in California's 3rd congressional district, represented by Independent Kevin Kiley.

== Education ==
The school district is Plumas Unified School District.
