= James Beckwourth =

American explorer (died 1866)

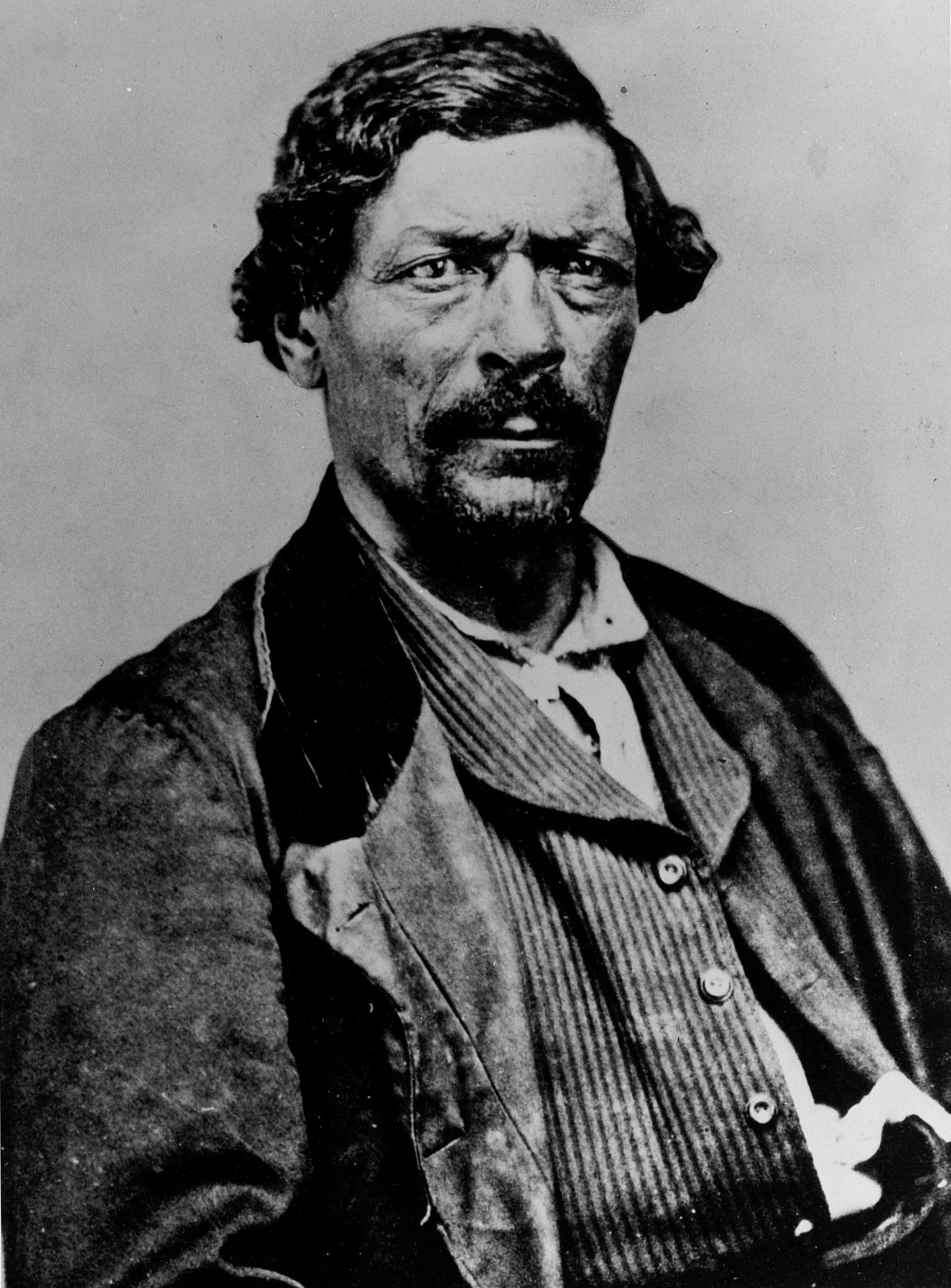
- Beckwourth, c. 1856
- Born: James Beckwith; April 26, 1798 (or 1800); Frederick County, Virginia, U.S.
- Died: October 20, 1866 near Fort Smith, Montana, U.S.
- Other name: Bloody Arm
- Occupations: Fur trapper, rancher, businessman, explorer, author and scout
- Employer(s): Rocky Mountain Fur Company, American Fur Company
- Children: 4
- Military career
- Allegiance: United States
- Branch: United States Army
- Unit: 3rd Colorado Cavalry Regiment
- Conflicts: Second Seminole War; Colorado War; Sand Creek massacre; Red Cloud's War

James Pierson Beckwourth (April 26, 1798/1800 – October 20, 1866) was an American fur trapper, rancher, businessman, explorer, author and scout. Known as "Bloody Arm" because of his skill as a fighter, Beckwourth was of multiracial descent, being born into slavery in Frederick County, Virginia. He was eventually emancipated by his master, who was also his father, and apprenticed to a blacksmith so that he could learn a trade.

As a young man, Beckwourth moved to the Western United States, first making connections with fur traders in St. Louis, Missouri. As a mountain man, he lived with the Crow people for several years. He is credited with the discovery of Beckwourth Pass, the lowest pass through the Sierra Nevada, connecting Reno, Nevada, and Portola, California during the California Gold Rush. He improved the Beckwourth Trail, which thousands of settlers followed to central California. Beckwourth narrated his life story to Thomas D. Bonner, who was described as "an itinerant justice of the peace", but was also a temperance speaker and journalist, who, according to his preface, by chance was present in Beckwourth's rustic California hotel when he decided to dictate his memoirs. The book was published in New York City and London in 1856 as The Life and Adventures of James P. Beckwourth: Mountaineer, Scout and Pioneer, and Chief of the Crow Nation of Indians. A translation appeared in France in 1860.

The reliability of Beckworth's autobiography was called into question from the beginning; an editor of it quoted the observation "that some one said of him that some men are rarely worthy of belief, but that Jim was always Beckwourthy of un-belief." "I knew Jim intimately and he was the biggest liar that ever lived." A review when it appeared called it "half fiction":

[P]arts of the tale smack of the "fish story." Mr. Beckwourth, or his narrator, has it all his own way, and we can fancy a lurking smile at the thought how glibly he puts together such a discordant mass of material brought out from the storehouse of memory, where there is no one at hand positively to contradict him.

Elinor Wilson has defended Beckwourth's narration as a valuable source of social history, especially for life among the Crow, although not all its details are reliable or accurate. The civil rights movement of the 1960s celebrated Beckwourth as an early African-American pioneer. He has since been featured as a role model in children's literature and textbooks.

== Early life ==
James Beckwith was born into slavery on April 26, 1798 (or 1800), in Frederick County, Virginia. Of multiracial descent, his father was Jennings Beckwith, a white planter, and his mother was a Black woman enslaved by Jennings. Jennings was the son of Sir Marmaduke Beckwith, 3rd Baronet, who had immigrated to Virginia and worked as a merchant. Jennings reportedly had thirteen children with James' mother.

Jennings moved to Missouri around 1809, when James was young, taking James' mother and all her children with him. Although Beckwith acknowledged and raised his mixed-race children as his own, he legally held them as owner. His father arranged to apprentice him to a blacksmith so that he could learn a good trade. At age 19, he was fired by the artisan after getting into an argument with him. His father freed Beckwourth by manumission, by deed of emancipation in court in 1824, 1825, and 1826.

== Career ==
=== Fur trade and Crow tribe ===
As a young man in 1824 Beckwourth joined General William Ashley's Rocky Mountain Fur Company. He worked as a wrangler during Ashley's expedition to explore the Rocky Mountains. In the following years, Beckwourth became known as a prominent trapper and mountain man. In July 1825, at a Rocky Mountain Rendezvous, trapper and colleague Caleb Greenwood told the campfire story of Beckwourth's being the child of a Crow chief. He claimed Beckwourth had been stolen as a baby by raiding Cheyenne and sold to whites. This lore was widely believed, as Beckwourth had adopted Native American dress and was taken by some people as an Indian.

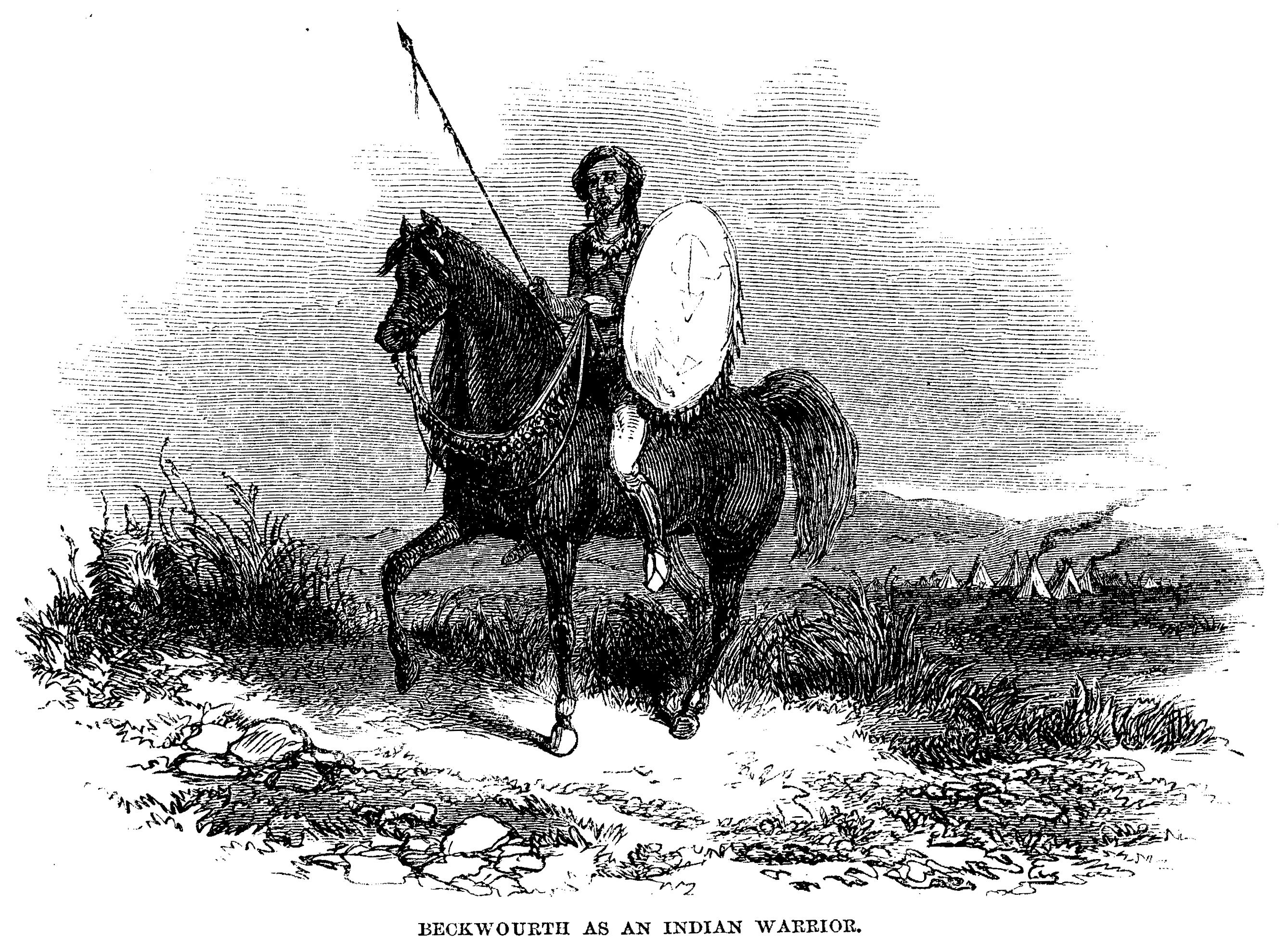
Beckwourth as Indian warrior, 1856

Later that year, Beckwourth claimed to have been captured by Crow while trapping in the border county between the territories of Crow, Cheyenne, and Blackfoot. According to his account, he was mistaken for the lost son of a Crow chief, so they admitted him to the nation. Independent accounts suggest his stay with the Crow was planned by the Rocky Mountain Fur Company to advance its trade with the tribe. Beckwourth married the daughter of a chief. (Marriages between Native Americans and fur trappers and traders were common for the valuable alliances they provided both parties.)

For the next eight to nine years, Beckwourth lived with a Crow band, who named him "Bull's Robe." He rose in their society from warrior to chief (a respected man) and leader of the "Dog Clan". According to his book, he eventually ascended to the highest-ranking war chieftaincy of the Crow tribe. He still trapped but did not sell his or Crow furs to his former partners of the Rocky Mountain Fur Company. Instead, he sold to John Jacob Astor's competing American Fur Company. Beckwourth participated in raids by the Crow on neighboring nations and the occasional white party. Sometimes such raids escalated to warfare, most often against bands of their traditional Blackfoot enemy.

In 1837, when the American Fur Company did not renew his contract, Beckwourth returned to St. Louis. He volunteered with the United States Army to fight in the Second Seminole War in Florida. In his book, he claims to have been a soldier and courier. According to historical records, he was a civilian wagon master in the baggage division. During one trade exchange Beckwourth may have helped to spread smallpox to an Indian tribe. When Little Robe had complained to fur trapper Jim Bridger that "white men" were responsible for destroying his people, Bridger replied that Whites didn't do that, "he told Little Robe how Jim Beckwourth a Mulatto...had done this evil thing," by trading infected blankets with the Indians, and pointing out that "Beckwourth...was a Negro, and therefore not a white man." From 1838 to 1840, Beckwourth was an Indian trader to the Cheyenne, on the Arkansas River, working out of Fort Vasquez, Colorado, near Platteville. In 1840, he moved to Bent, St. Vrain & Company. Later that same year, Beckwourth became an independent trader. In 1842, Beckwourth moved to new settlement at Pueblo, Colorado with a wife (or consort), Maria Luisa Sandoval and a child Matilda. In 1843, he departed for California and when he returned to Pueblo in 1846 Luisa was married (in the informal style of the mountains) to John Brown.

In 1844, Beckwourth traded on the Old Spanish Trail between the Arkansas River and California, then controlled by Mexico. When the Mexican–American War began in 1846, Beckwourth returned to the United States. He brought along nearly 1,800 stolen Mexican horses as spoils of war. In the war, he served as a courier with the U.S. Army and helped suppress the Taos Revolt. His former employer, Charles Bent, then interim governor of New Mexico, was slain in that revolt.

=== Business ===
By 1848 and the start of the Gold Rush, Beckwourth went to California. He first opened a store at Sonoma. He soon sold and went to Sacramento, then a boomtown close to the mines, to live as a professional card player.

In 1850, Beckwourth was credited with discovering what came to be called Beckwourth Pass, a low-elevation pass through the Sierra Nevada mountain chain. In 1851, he improved what became the Beckwourth Trail, originally a Native American path through the mountains. It began near Pyramid Lake and the Truckee Meadows east of the mountains, climbed to the pass named for him, and went along a ridge, between two forks of Feather River, before passing down through the gold fields of northern California, and on to Marysville. The trail spared the settlers and gold seekers about 150 miles (240 km) and several steep grades and dangerous passes, such as Donner Pass.

By his account, the business communities of the gold towns in California were supposed to fund the making of the trail. However, when Beckwourth tried to collect his payment in 1851 after leading a party, Marysville suffered from two huge fires and town leaders were unable to pay. (In 1996, in recognition of his contribution to the city's development and of the outstanding debt to him, the City of Marysville officially renamed the town's largest park as Beckwourth Riverfront Park.)

Beckwourth began ranching in the Sierra. His ranch, trading post, and hotel, in today's Sierra Valley, were the starting of the settlement of Beckwourth, California. In the winter of 1854/55, the itinerant judge Thomas D. Bonner stayed in the hotel, and on winter nights Beckwourth told him his life story. Bonner wrote it down, edited the material the following year, and offered the book to Harper & Brothers in New York. The Life and Adventures of James P. Beckwourth was published in 1856. According to the contract, Beckwourth was entitled to one-half of the proceeds, but he never received any income from Bonner. The book provides historical information on how U.S. government officials used alcohol; how occupations affect those who work in the field; the historical relationship among diseases, wildlife, and the environment; as well as reports dealing with massacres and war.

=== Military service ===
In 1859, Beckwourth returned to Missouri briefly but settled later that year in Denver, Colorado Territory. Working as a storekeeper in the employ of Louis Vasquez, Beckwourth was appointed as an Indian agent by the government. In 1864, Beckwourth was hired as a scout by United States Army officer John Chivington, who commanded the 3rd Colorado Cavalry Regiment. The regiment subsequently served in a campaign against the Cheyenne and Apache as part of the Colorado War. Chivington's men perpetrated the Sand Creek massacre on November 29, 1864, in which the U.S. Army slaughtered an estimated 70-163 Cheyenne people, who had camped in an area suggested by the previous commander of Fort Lyon as a safe place and were flying an American flag to show their peaceful intentions. Outraged by his involvement in the massacre, the Cheyenne banned Beckwourth from trading with them. Well into his sixties by then, Beckwourth returned to trapping. In 1866, during Red Cloud's War, the United States Army again employed him as a scout at Fort Laramie and Fort Phil Kearny.

== Death ==
While guiding a military column to a Crow band in Montana, Beckwourth complained of severe headaches and suffered nosebleeds, most probably the result of a severe case of hypertension, but Jim Bridger heard that the Crows had poisoned him. Beckwourth returned to the Crow village, where he died in 1866. William Byers, a personal friend and the founder of the Rocky Mountain News, claimed the Crow had poisoned Beckwourth. He said the tribe felt they could no longer trust him. Beckwourth was buried at the lodge of Iron Bull near Fort Smith and Clarks Fork in Crow Territory. Lt. Templeton, stationed at Fort C.F. Smith in the "heart of the Crow Hunting Grounds", chronicled the end of Beckwourth's life in his diary. He wrote "On his arrival at the village he and Thompson were taken into the lodge of the Iron Bull and were his guest while he remained. There Beckwourth died and was buried by his host."

== In popular culture ==
- Leigh Brackett, Follow the Free Wind, New York: Doubleday, 1963 (novel based on Beckwourth's life)
- Matt Braun, Bloody Hand, New York: St Martin's Press, 1996, ISBN 0-312-95839-0. (novel about Beckwourth's life with the Crow)
- In the 2021 film The Harder They Fall directed by Jeymes Samuel, his role was played by actor RJ Cyler.

== Legacy ==
- Beckwourth Pass, named in honor of Beckwourth, is located in the Sierra Nevada Mountains in Plumas County, California. This pass and route was used by the Western Pacific Railroad to cross the Sierra along their Feather River route. The pass is located east of Portola, California. State Route 70 crosses the Sierra at this pass at an elevation of 1,591 m (5,221 ft); it is the lowest pass crossing the Sierras in California.
- In 1994, the U.S. Postal Service issued a 29-cent commemorative postage stamp honoring Beckwourth as part of the set Legends of the West.
- In 1996, the city of Marysville, California renamed its largest park as Beckwourth Riverfront Park to commemorate his contributions to development of the city. For a few years, the "Beckwourth Frontier Days" were celebrated annually in October and were the only living history festival in northern California.
- What is now West 5th Ave. in Denver, Colorado, was named Beckwourth Street (sometimes Beckwith) after James Beckwourth.
- In 2011 a memorial commemorating Beckwourth's role in the founding of Pueblo, Colorado, was erected in that city.

== See also ==
- Mount Ina Coolbrith
- George Bonga
- History of slavery in Colorado
- List of African American pioneers of Colorado
- Beckwith baronets
