= Plumas Lake, California =

Plumas Lake
- Census-designated place
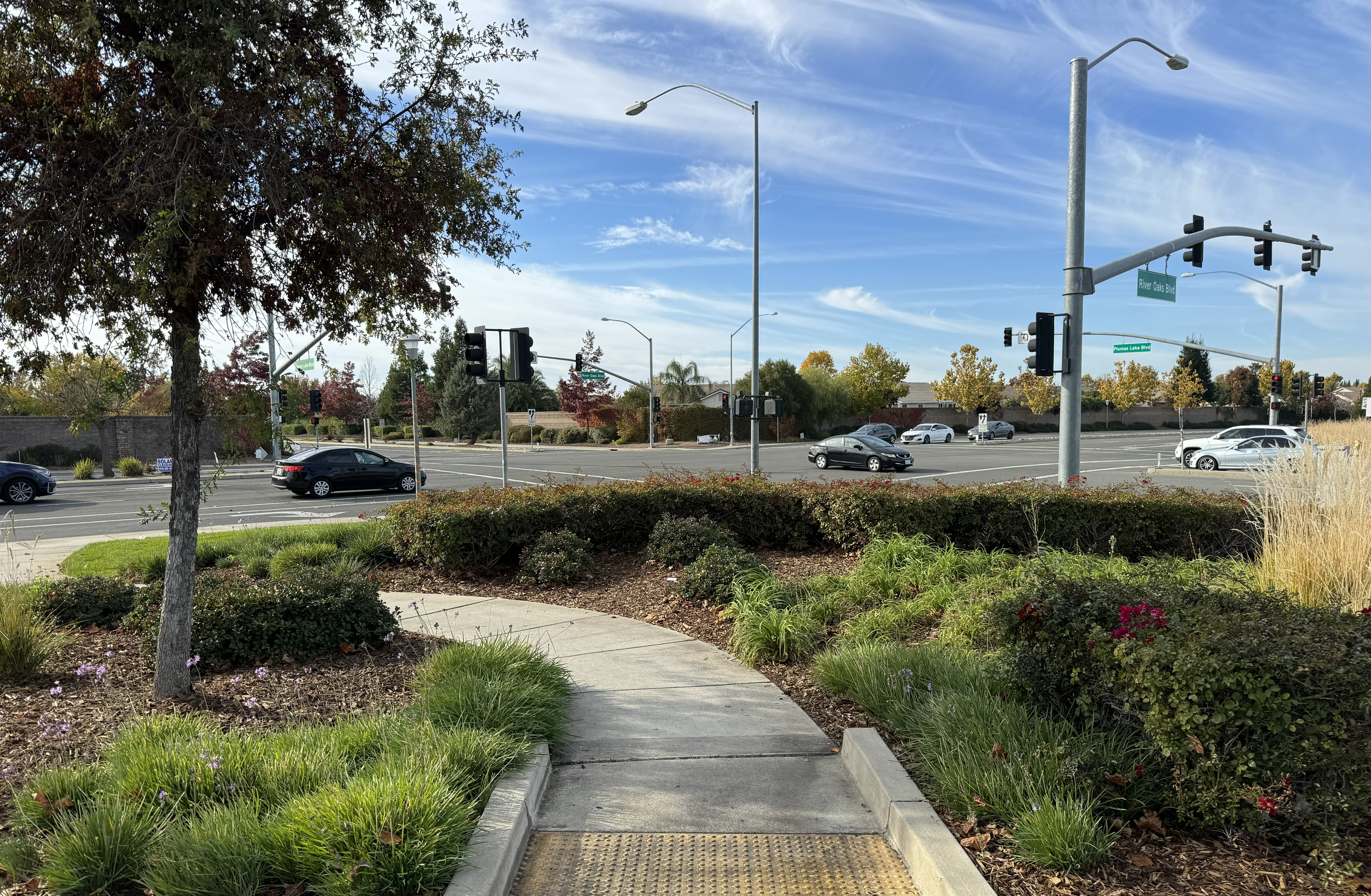
- Plumas Lake and River Oaks Boulevards
- Interactive map of Plumas Lake
- Location within California Location within the United States
- Coordinates: 39°01′15″N 121°33′29″W
- Country: United States
- State: California
- County: Yuba

Area
  - Total: 11.9 sq mi (30.7 km^{2})
  - Land: 11.9 sq mi (30.7 km^{2})
  - Water: 0 sq mi (0 km^{2})
- Elevation: 46 ft (14 m)

Population (2020)
  - Total: 8,126
  - Density: 687/sq mi (265/km^{2})
- Time zone: UTC−08:00 (PST)
  - Summer (DST): UTC−07:00 (PDT)
- ZIP Code: 95961
- Area code: 530
- FIPS code: 06-57829
- GNIS feature ID: 2037166; 2583117

Plumas Lake is a master-planned exurb and census-designated place in Yuba County, California, United States. It is located 30 miles (48 km) north of Sacramento and 10 miles (16 km) south of Marysville off California State Route 70. Its population was 8,126 at the 2020 census.

Plumas Lake was first conceived in 1993 as a means to guide development along the Feather and Bear Rivers. Construction began in 2003 and at full build-out the community is expected to have roughly 12,000 homes and 36,000 residents.

== History ==
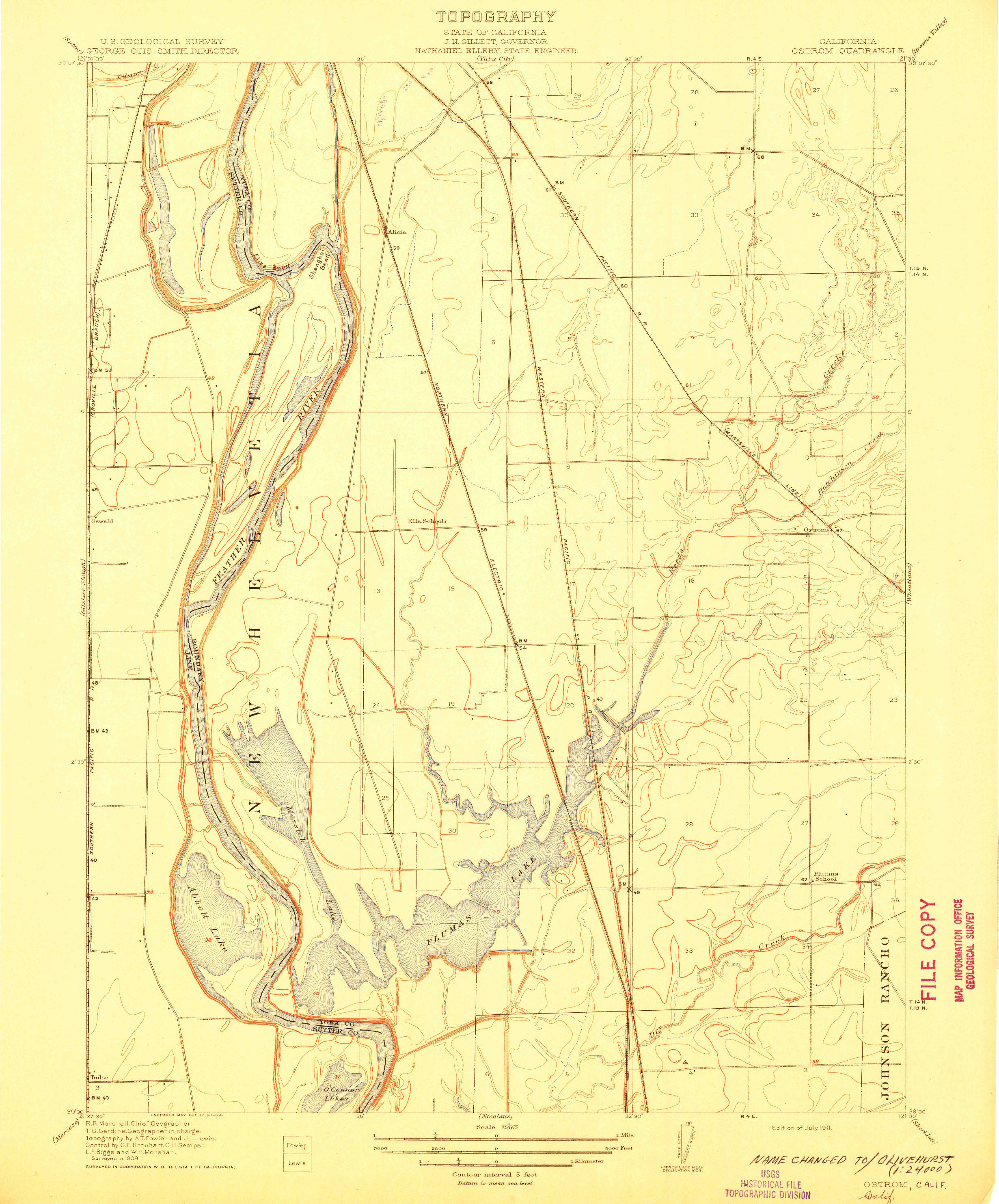
Plumas Lake as surveyed by the USGS in 1909

There was previously a settlement called Plumas Landing (also known as Plumas City) west of Plumas Lake on the bank of the Feather River. The old settlement was impacted by Gold rush-era hydraulic mining in the Yuba River watershed upstream. Mine tailings wound up in the riverbeds and were then transported into the Sacramento Valley, where they accumulated in the river channels and reduced their conveyance capacities.

Flood risk has been a concern throughout Plumas Lake's development and many individuals and agencies were opposed to its construction. The area that would become the community of Plumas Lake experienced major floods in 1986 and 1997. Despite this, the first master plan for Plumas Lake was approved in 1993 and construction started early 2003.

In the years since construction began the levee infrastructure has improved significantly. In 2019, FEMA accredited the community with moderate-to-low flood risk. The community is rated against 200-year floods which equates to a 1 in 200 chance (0.5% probability) that a flood will occur in any given year. Improvements to existing water management infrastructure could enable 500-year flood protection in the future.

== Geography ==
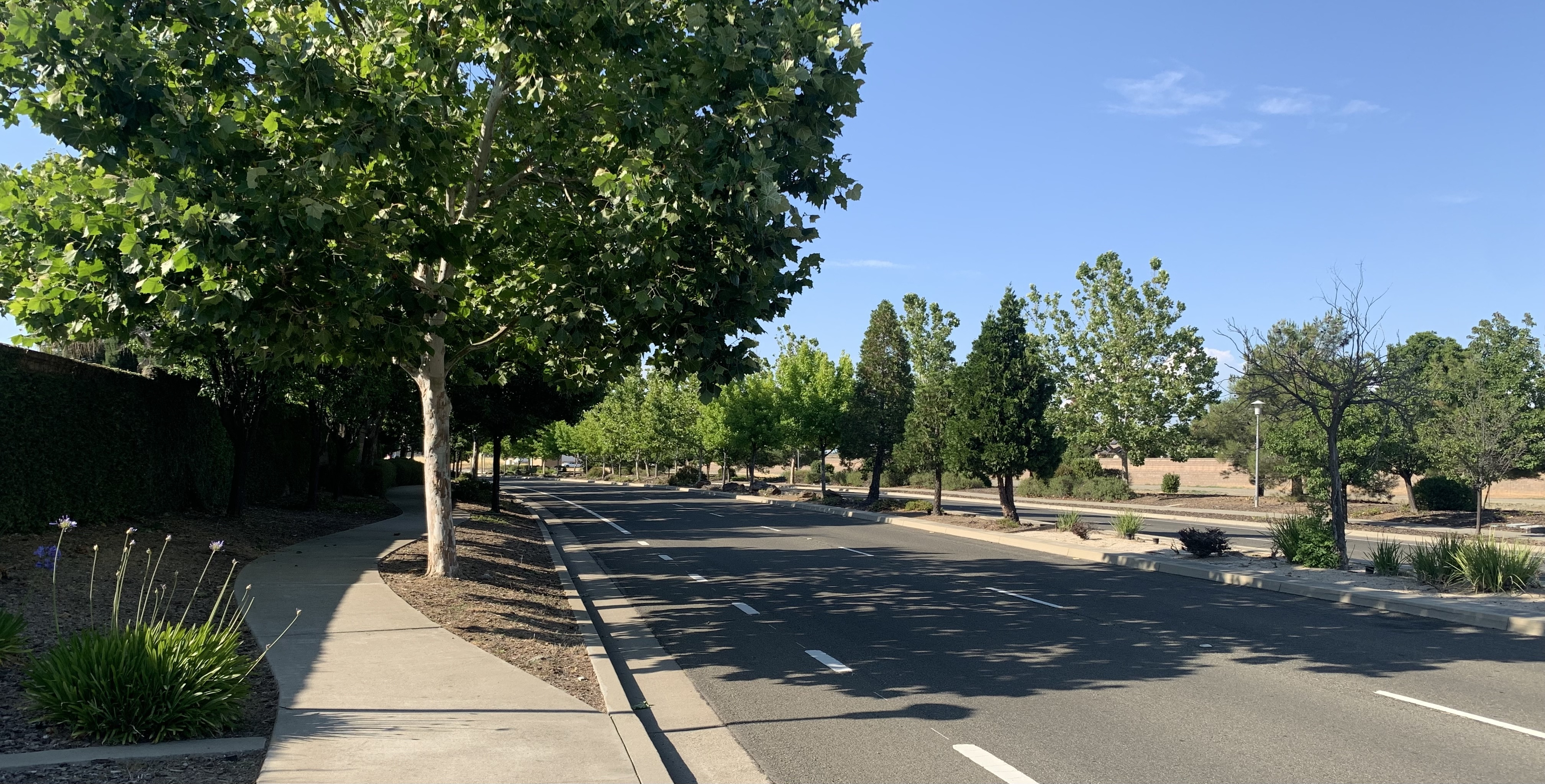
River Oaks Boulevard

Plumas Lake is located at 39°1′14.62″N 121°33′28.86″W (39.0207272, -121.5580176). According to the United States Census Bureau, the CDP of Plumas Lake covers an area of 11.84 square miles (30.7 km^{2}), all land. It lies at an elevation of 46 feet (14 m) and shares a same ZIP code as Olivehurst, a neighboring community.

Plumas Lake is in the southern tip of Yuba County, near the confluence of the Feather and Bear Rivers. The community's northern and southern ends are connected by River Oaks Boulevard and Algodon Slough, a seasonal backwater that flows into the Bear River. A common misconception is that the community is built on top of a dry lake. The old lake is actually located northwest of the community and is now mostly agricultural land.

Since Plumas Lake is an unincorporated community, there are a few ways to define its borders. The most popular definition is the census-designated place which includes land south of Algodon Road, north of Bear River, and some adjacent rural areas. The Plumas Lake Specific Plan's definition extends even further north to include the Olivehurst suburb of Wheeler Ranch, Plumas Lake Golf Club, Arboga, and rural areas in between. The largest definition is the Plumas Lake ZIP code area, which includes land east of the Feather River, west of Forty Mile Road, and everything north of Bear River up to the new developments along Arboga Road.

=== Climate ===
According to the Köppen Climate Classification system, Plumas Lake has a hot-summer Mediterranean climate, abbreviated "Csa" on climate maps.

Climate data for Plumas Lake, California (1991–2020 normals)
Month	Jan	Feb	Mar	Apr	May	Jun	Jul	Aug	Sep	Oct	Nov	Dec	Year
Mean daily maximum °F (°C)	55.4 (13.0)	60.8 (16.0)	65.9 (18.8)	71.7 (22.1)	80.2 (26.8)	88.4 (31.3)	94.2 (34.6)	93.1 (33.9)	88.6 (31.4)	78.7 (25.9)	64.7 (18.2)	55.6 (13.1)	74.8 (23.8)
Daily mean °F (°C)	47.1 (8.4)	50.9 (10.5)	54.9 (12.7)	59.1 (15.1)	66.2 (19.0)	72.9 (22.7)	77.3 (25.2)	76.2 (24.6)	72.4 (22.4)	64.1 (17.8)	53.4 (11.9)	46.8 (8.2)	61.8 (16.5)
Mean daily minimum °F (°C)	38.8 (3.8)	41.0 (5.0)	43.8 (6.6)	46.4 (8.0)	52.2 (11.2)	57.4 (14.1)	60.4 (15.8)	59.4 (15.2)	56.1 (13.4)	49.5 (9.7)	42.0 (5.6)	38.1 (3.4)	48.8 (9.3)
Average precipitation inches (mm)	3.91 (99)	3.56 (90)	2.99 (76)	1.48 (38)	0.90 (23)	0.24 (6.1)	0.00 (0.00)	0.03 (0.76)	0.12 (3.0)	0.91 (23)	2.06 (52)	3.70 (94)	19.9 (504.86)
Source: PRISM Climate Group

== Demographics ==
Historical population
Census	Pop.	Note	%±
2010	5,853		—
2020	8,126		38.8%
U.S. Decennial Census; 1860–1870 1880-1890; 1900 1910 1920; 1930 1940 1950; 1960 1970 1980; 1990 2000 2010; 2020

Plumas Lake first appeared as a census designated place in the 2010 U.S. Census.

=== Racial and ethnic composition ===
Historical demographics	2020	2010
White	57.3%	67%
Asian	8.6%	8.1%
Black or African American	5.2%	6.4%
Native American	1.4%	1.2%
Pacific Islander	0.8%	0.8%
Other races	8.1%	7.7%
Two or more races	18.6%	8.8%
Hispanic or Latino (of any race)	24.3%	22.4%

=== 2020 census ===
As of the 2020 census, Plumas Lake had a population of 8,126, an increase of 38.8% from 5,853 at the 2010 census. It has the 4th highest population in Yuba County among cities and CDPs, behind Linda, Olivehurst, and Marysville.

The population density was 687 inhabitants per square mile (265/km^{2}). The median age was 32.8 years. 33.1% of residents were under the age of 18 and 7.7% of residents were 65 years of age or older. For every 100 females there were 101.6 males, and for every 100 females age 18 and over there were 99.4 males.

90.3% of residents lived in urban areas, while 9.7% lived in rural areas.

There were 2,363 households in Plumas Lake, of which 54.5% had children under the age of 18 living in them. Of all households, 68.9% were married-couple households, 11.5% were households with a male householder and no spouse or partner present, and 13.2% were households with a female householder and no spouse or partner present. About 9.5% of all households were made up of individuals and 2.0% had someone living alone who was 65 years of age or older.

There were 2,477 housing units, of which 4.6% were vacant. The homeowner vacancy rate was 3.0% and the rental vacancy rate was 4.8%.

There were 134 (5.7%) unmarried opposite-sex partnerships, and 156 (6.6%) same-sex married couples or partnerships. The average household size was 3.44.

=== Income and poverty ===
According to Census Bureau profile data, the median household income for Plumas Lake was $104,021, and 4.5% of the population was living below the poverty line.

=== 2010 census ===
The 2010 United States census reported that Plumas Lake had a population of 5,853. The population density was 698 inhabitants per square mile (269/km^{2}). The racial makeup of Plumas Lake was 3,923 (67.0%) White, 474 (8.1%) Asian, 372 (6.4%) African American, 73 (1.2%) Native American, 44 (0.8%) Pacific Islander, 451 (7.7%) from other races, and 516 (8.8%) from two or more races. Hispanic or Latino of any race were 1,312 persons (22.4%).

There were 1,745 households, out of which 1,043 (59.8%) had children under the age of 18 living in them, 1,195 (68.5%) were opposite-sex married couples living together, 155 (8.9%) had a female householder with no husband present, 117 (6.7%) had a male householder with no wife present. There were 127 (7.3%) unmarried opposite-sex partnerships, and 20 (1.1%) same-sex married couples or partnerships. 183 households (10.5%) were made up of individuals, and 21 (1.2%) had someone living alone who was 65 years of age or older. The average household size was 3.35. There were 1,467 families (84.1% of all households); the average family size was 3.61.

The population was spread out, with 2,144 people (36.6%) under the age of 18, 380 people (6.5%) aged 18 to 24, 2,204 people (37.7%) aged 25 to 44, 926 people (15.8%) aged 45 to 64, and 199 people (3.4%) who were 65 years of age or older. The median age was 29.1 years. For every 100 females, there were 104.6 males. For every 100 females age 18 and over, there were 99.0 males.

There were 1,924 housing units at an average density of 229.5 per square mile (88.6/km^{2}), of which 1,480 (84.8%) were owner-occupied, and 265 (15.2%) were occupied by renters. The homeowner vacancy rate was 6.2%; the rental vacancy rate was 6.0%. 4,835 people (82.6% of the population) lived in owner-occupied housing units and 1,018 people (17.4%) lived in rental housing units.

== Parks and recreation ==
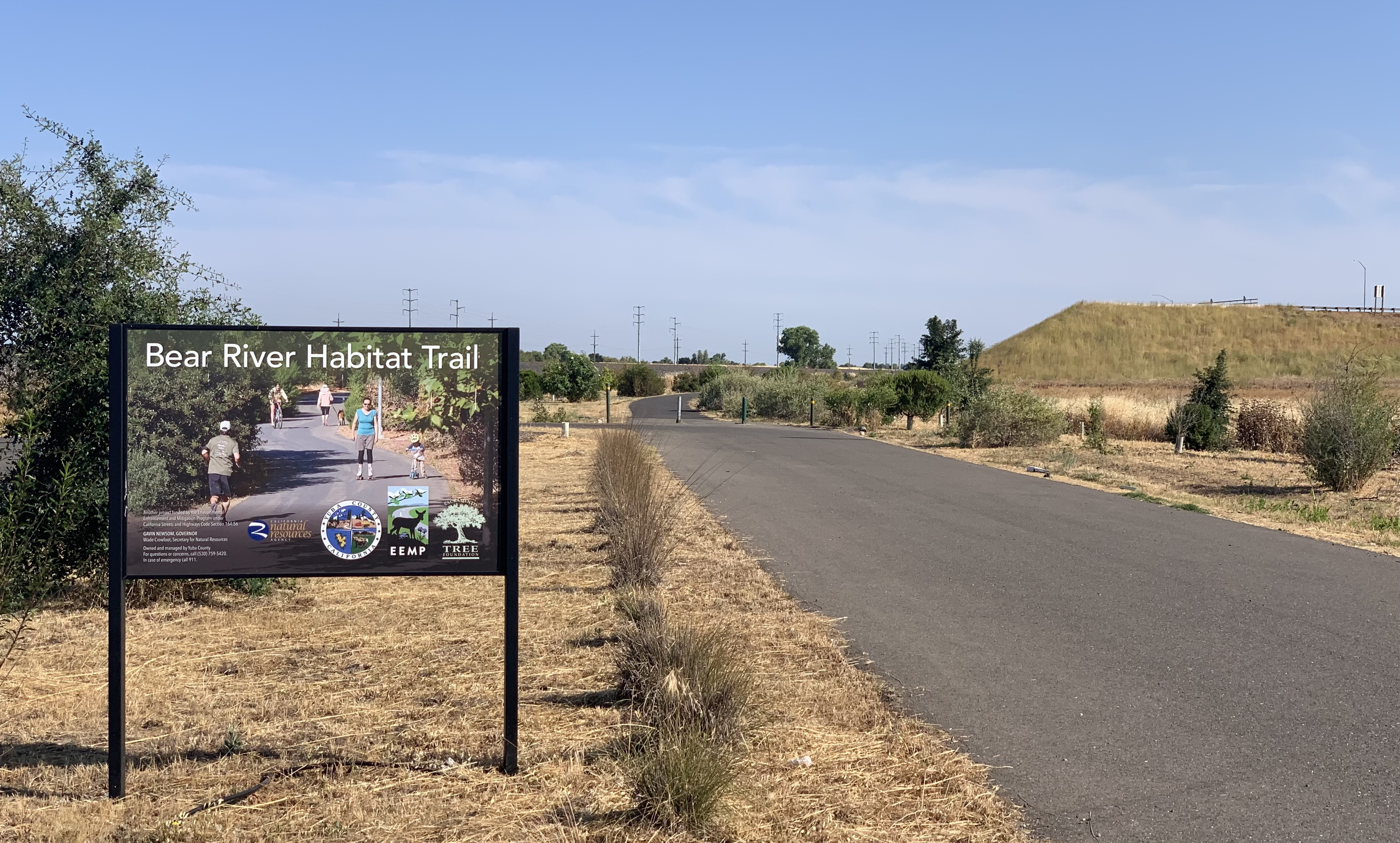
Bear River Habitat Trail

Plumas Lake currently has 15+ parks (including Wheeler Ranch) and a paved pedestrian/bike path called the Bear River Habitat Trail. Also nearby is the Plumas Lake Golf Club, Toyota Amphitheatre, and Hard Rock Hotel & Casino Sacramento at Fire Mountain.

=== Parks ===
- Bear River Park
- Bill Pinkerton Memorial Park
- Donald Brown Memorial Park
- Eufay Wood Sr. Memorial Park
- Feather River East Park
- Orchard Glen Park
- River Glen Park
- River Park
- Riverside Meadows Park
- Rolling Hills Park
- Veteran's Park
- Joann Aiello Memorial Park (Wheeler Ranch)
- Leila Smith Memorial Park (Wheeler Ranch)
- Richard Donahue Park (Wheeler Ranch)
- Wheeler Ranch Park (Wheeler Ranch)

== Government ==
Plumas Lake receives water, wastewater, park, and recreation services from the Olivehurst Public Utility District. Fire services are provided by the Linda Fire Protection District.

In the Yuba County Board of Supervisors, Plumas Lake is in the 4th Supervisor district, represented by Gary Bradford.

=== State and federal representation ===
United States presidential election results for Plumas Lake, California^{[a]}
Year	Republican		Democratic		Third party(ies)	
Year	No.	%	No.	%	No.	%
2012	1,245	55.90%	928	41.67%	54	2.42%
2016	1,683	56.61%	1,059	35.62%	231	7.77%
2020	2,657	55.00%	2,013	41.67%	161	3.33%

In the California State Legislature, Plumas Lake is in the 1st senatorial district, represented by Republican Megan Dahle, and in the 3rd Assembly district, represented by Vacant.

In the United States House of Representatives, Plumas Lake is in California's 1st congressional district, represented by Republican James Gallagher.

== Education ==
Plumas Lake is served by the Plumas Lake Elementary School District (K-8) and the Wheatland Union High School District, Plumas Lake district (9-12).

=== Schools ===
- Cobblestone Elementary
- Rio Del Oro Elementary
- Riverside Meadows Intermediate School
- Plumas Lake High School (in development)

== Notes ==
a.Election data uses a combination of the Plumas Lake Specific Plan and the Plumas Lake CDP to define Plumas Lake's borders.
