= Big Kimshew Creek =

Coordinates: 39.8796°N 121.5072°W

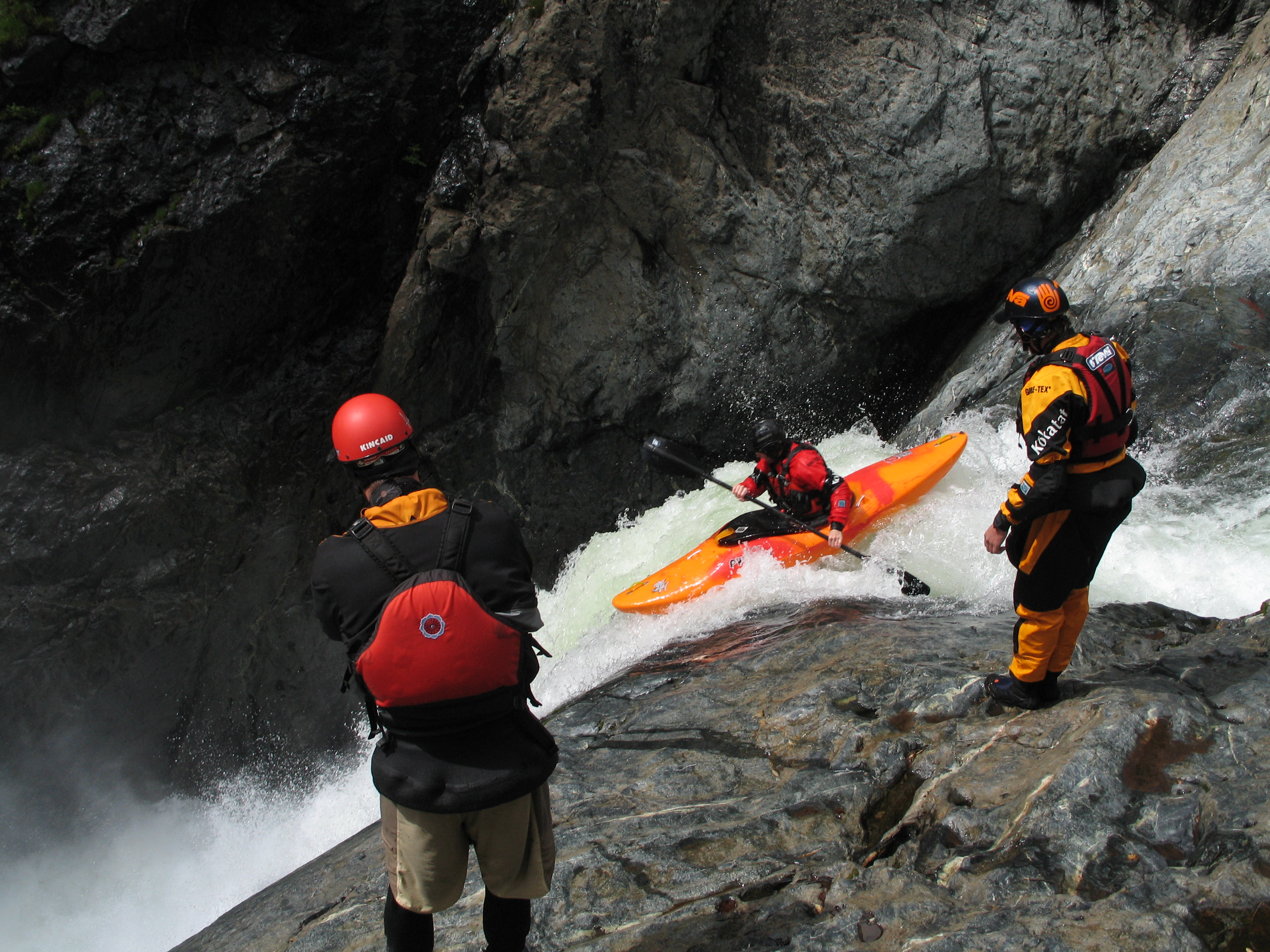
- Kayakers run Frenchy’s Falls on Big Kimshew Creek during the springtime

Location
- Country: United States
- State: California

Physical characteristics
- Source
  - location: Table Mountain
- Mouth
  - location: West Branch Feather River
- Length: 11 mi (18 km)
- Basin size: 27 mi^{2} (70 km^{2})
- Discharge
  - average: 200 cubic feet per second (5.7 m^{3}/s)

Big Kimshew Creek is a stream in Butte county northern California. It originates in the Lassen National Forest of the Sierra Nevada Mountains and flows some 11 miles (18 km) in a generally south-southwesterly direction to join the West Branch Feather River, a tributary of the Feather River, a major northern California river system.

The creek is known for its whitewater rapids and waterfalls. Its discharge fluctuates dramatically between spring, when it carries snowmelt, and autumn, ranging from 10 to 1,000 cubic feet per second (0.28 to 28.32 m^{3}/s).

== Geography ==
The creek rises in a meadow 1 mile (1.6 km) northwest of Table Mountain in the southern extreme of the national forest. It flows south into a gorge, receiving Keyser Creek from the right, and Little Kimshew Creek from the left shortly after. At the Little Kimshew confluence it turns west, then again southwest, through a valley over 1,200 feet (370 m) deep. It is joined by Little Rock Creek just above the confluence with the West Branch Feather River. The creek's mouth is situated about 2.5 miles (4.0 km) south of Stirling City.
