= Sierra Valley =

Mountain valley in California, U.S.

Coordinates: 39°46′15″N 120°19′40″W

Sierra Valley is a large mountain valley located east of the crest of California's Sierra Nevada mountain range in Plumas and Sierra Counties, north of Interstate 80.

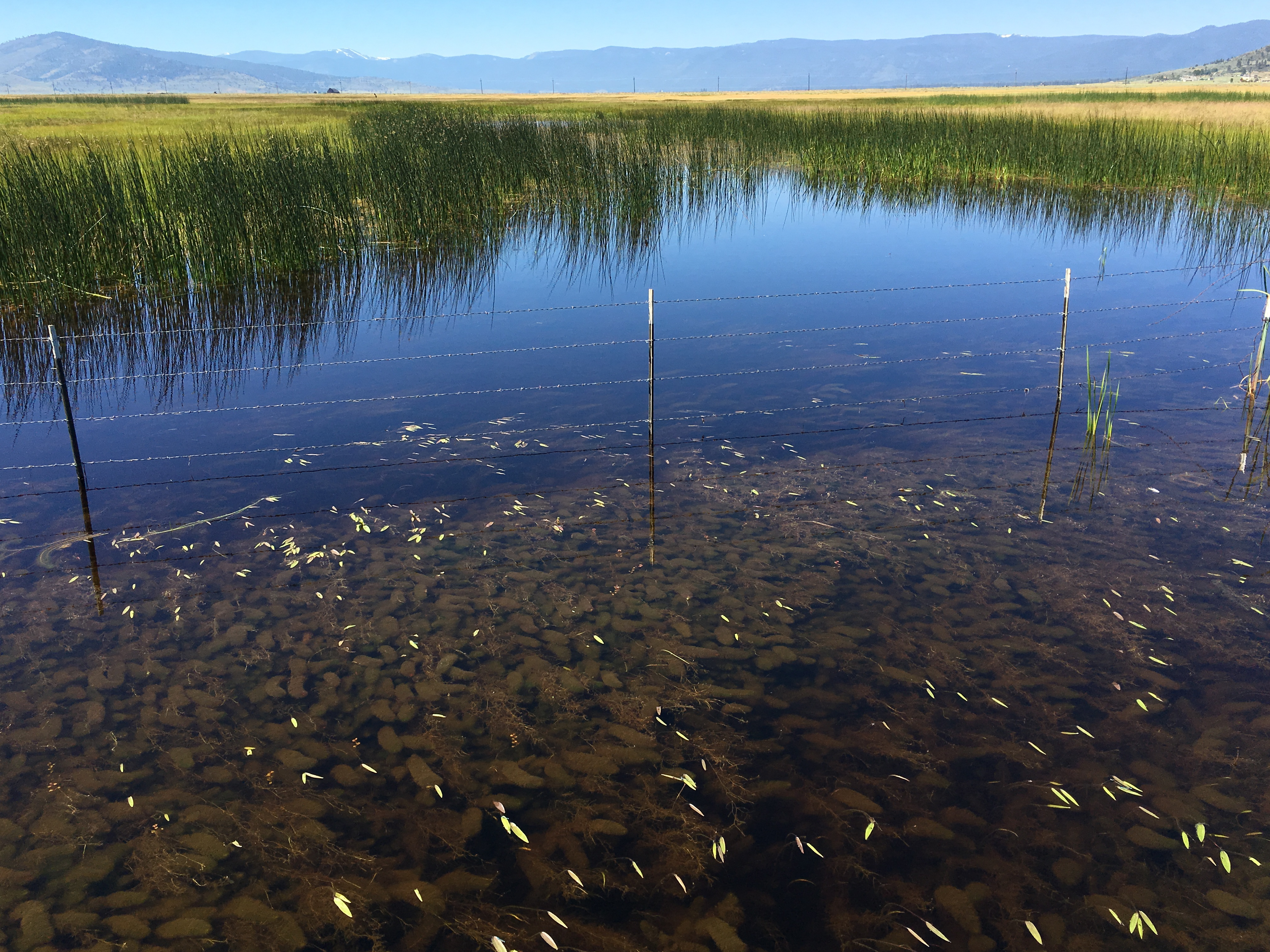
A ranch in Sierra Valley

== Geography ==
An intermontane valley at approximately 4,850 feet (1,480 m) elevation, Sierra Valley is surrounded by mountains ranging in elevation from 6,000 to 8,000 feet (2,400 m). The huge valley covering about 590 square miles (1,500 km^{2}) is a down-faulted basin, formerly a lake of similar geologic origin to Lake Tahoe to the south, now filled with sediment up to two thousand feet thick. The former Lake has the suggested name of Lake Beckwourth and existed until approximately 10,000 years ago. Average annual rainfall is less than twenty inches, most falling as snow, though flooding is not unheard of in certain regions of the valley.

== Ecology ==
The valley floor has a grassland and sagebrush ecosystem and is the site of extensive freshwater marshes known as the Sierra Valley Channels. The extensive marshes are filled with cattails, bulrushes and alkaline flats that drain into the Wild and Scenic Middle Fork Feather River. Many species of wildlife make their permanent home in the valley, and a great number of migratory bird species stop over in the fall and nest in the valley in the spring. The valley also has thermal activity, most notably Marble Hot Springs located in the north central valley floor.

The Sierra Valley Preserve near Beckwourth, California protects 2,575 acres of land, including 1,100 acres of wetlands and hosts over 100 migrating and resident bird species. California state-listed species include greater sandhill cranes (Antigone canadensis tabida), black terns (Chlidonias niger), and yellow-headed blackbirds (Xanthocephalus xanthocephalus). On December 7, 2024 the Preserve opened the Sierra Valley Preserve Nature Center for public enjoyment. It was funded by The Feather River Land Trust, The Nature Conservancy and Northern Sierra Partnership, The Preserve also hosts pronghorn (Antilocapra americana) and elk (Cervus canadensis), the latter recolonizing the Sierra Valley beginning around 2010.

== Economy ==
Sierra Valley is an agricultural and livestock region. Tourism also contributes to the local economy with local events such as the "Art and Ag Trail."

== Access ==
Entrance from the west is through Yuba Pass on State Route 49. Entrance from the east is through Beckwourth Pass, on State Route 70. State Route 89 skirts the southern end of the valley. State Route 49, the Gold Rush trail, terminates at State Route 70 in Vinton, and the latter highway then terminates at Hallelujah Junction on U.S. Route 395 after passing through Chilcoot.

== Principal towns ==
- Sierraville
- Beckwourth
- Calpine
- Sattley
- Loyalton
- Vinton
- Chilcoot

== Sources ==
A Biological Baseline Study of Sierra Valley Marsh, California 1976. Dept. of Biology, SFSU. NSF SOS grant SMI-76-08071. This was a student originated study funded by the National Science Foundation to assess biological resources of the high-altitude freshwater marsh in Sierra Valley. A Biological Baseline Study of The Sierra Valley Marsh California - 1976
