= Williams Loop =

Rail spiral in California

Coordinates: 39°54′36″N 120°48′29″W

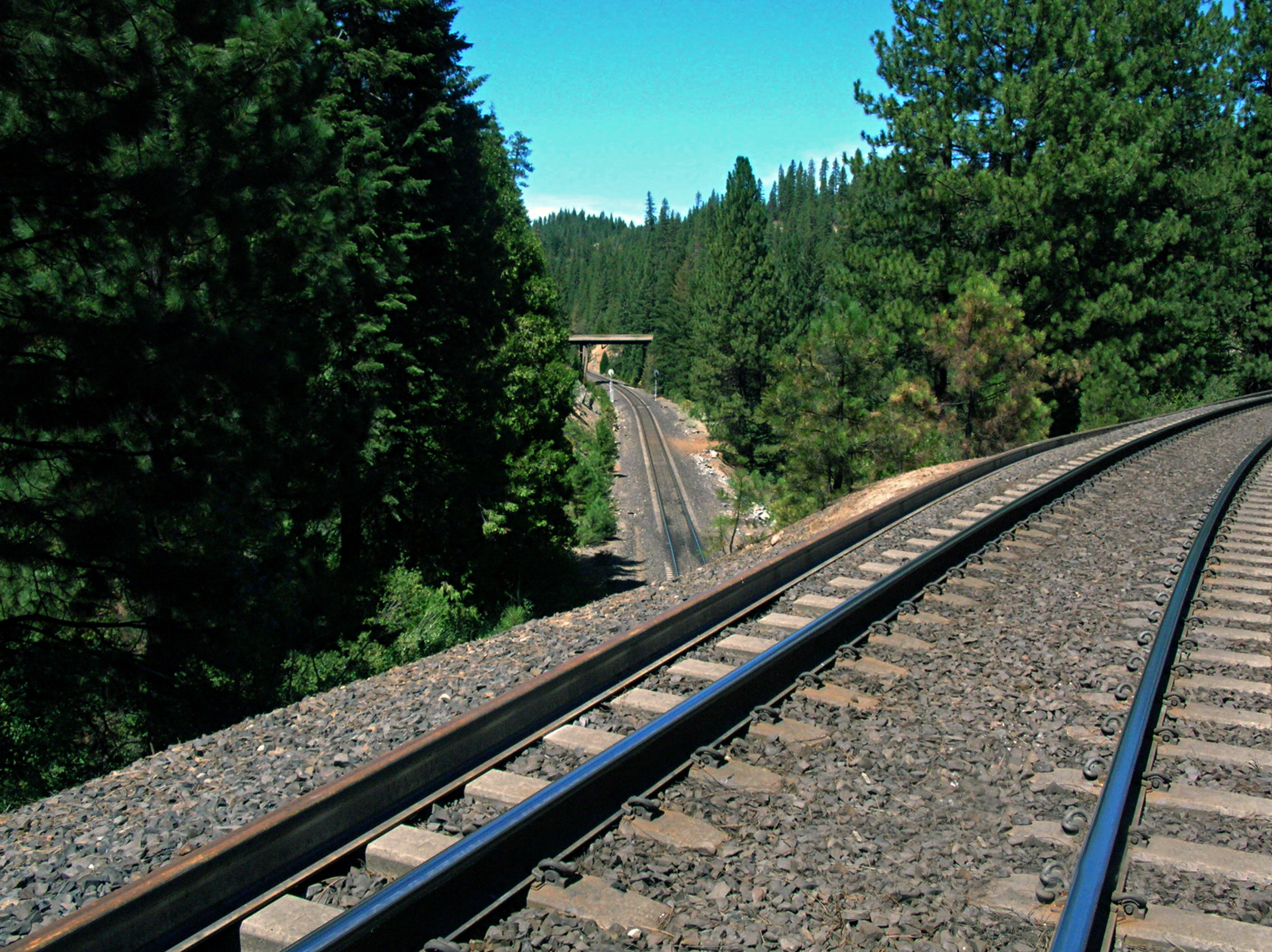
Williams Loop, looking west from the upper portion

The Williams Loop is a rail spiral on the Union Pacific Railroad's Feather River Route through the Sierra Nevada mountains in northeastern California, connecting the Sacramento Valley to Salt Lake City via the Feather River canyons. Located about five miles east of East Quincy, the loop is used to gain elevation on the eastward climb to its summit at Beckwourth Pass while maintaining the railroad's overall 1.0 percent (compensated) grade, the least steep of any grade on a transcontinental railroad. Built in 1914 by the Western Pacific Railroad, the loop and the nearby Spring Garden Tunnel help surmount the divide between the East Branch North Fork Feather River and the Middle Fork Feather River.

The Williams Loop is part of Plumas County's "7 Wonders of the Railroad World" and access is described in its travel guide.
