= Spring Garden Tunnel =

Railway tunnel in California

Coordinates: 39°53′15″N 120°47′02″W

The Spring Garden Tunnel is a railway tunnel located at Spring Garden, California. At 7,344 ft (1.3909 mi; 2,238 m) long, it is the longest of 34 tunnels on the Feather River Route (cf. Chilcoot Tunnel) and crosses under the drainage divide between the East Branch North Fork Feather River (north portal, ) and the Middle Fork Feather River (south portal, ).

== History ==
The Western Pacific Railroad (now part of the Union Pacific Railroad) built the tracks along the Feather River in 1909 to complete the Feather River Route, a San Francisco Bay Area to Salt Lake City route competing with the Southern Pacific's route over Donner Pass.

While significantly longer, the Feather River Route was preferred by some over the Donner Pass route (elevation about 7,000 ft [2,100 m]) over the Sierra Nevada mountains, because the former's summit under Beckwourth Pass is at a lower elevation (about 5,000 ft [1,500 m]) and most of the route follows a gentler grade along the Feather River.

The tunnel was designated one of Plumas County's "7 Wonders of the Railroad World," and the north portal is 0.15 miles (0.24 km) west on Railroad Street, then 0.35 miles (0.56 km) SSE along a fair-condition dirt road from Spring Garden, California.
