= Hallelujah Junction, California =

Hallelujah Junction
- Unincorporated community
- Location in California Hallelujah Junction (the United States)
- Coordinates: 39°46′32″N 120°02′22″W
- Country: United States
- State: California
- County: Lassen County
- Elevation: 5,033 ft (1,534 m)

Hallelujah Junction is a locale in Lassen County, California. It is located 4 miles (6.4 km) east-southeast of Beckwourth Pass, at an elevation of 5033 feet (1534 m). It is located at the interchange with U.S. Route 395 and the eastern terminus of State Route 70 (formerly US 40 Alt.).

This place originated when Orville Stoy relocated there and established a homestead and gas station, and it enjoyed status in the prohibition era. By 1940 there was a bar, restaurant and motel, and the “Hallelujah International Airport” on an abandoned stretch of Highway 70. It met its demise when the State of California purchased Hallelujah Junction in 1973 and levelled it to construct the four-lane freeway.

American composer John Adams, who owns a cabin nearby, wrote "Hallelujah Junction", a piece for two pianos, named after this location.
