= Loyalton, California =

City in California, United States

- City
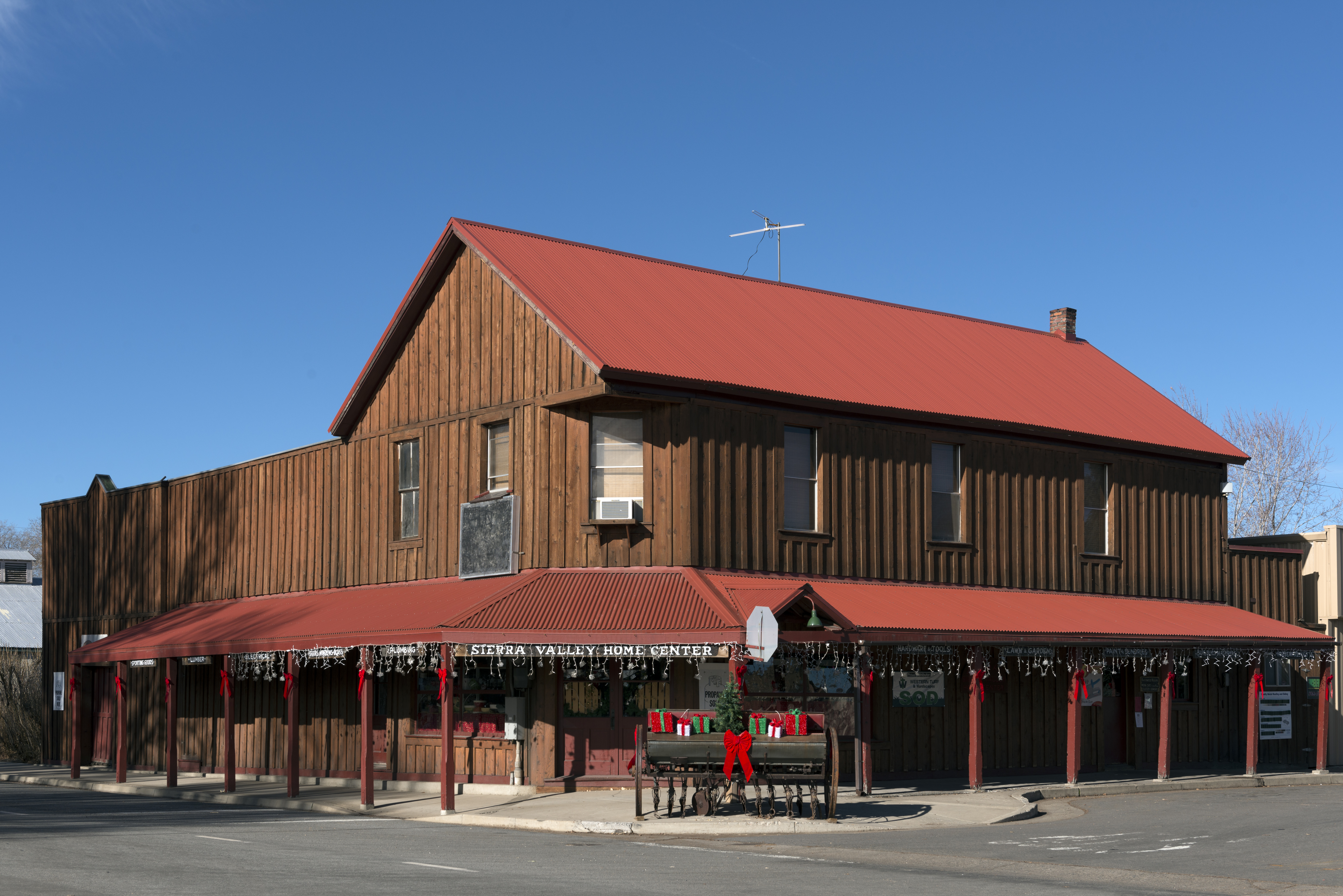
- Sierra Valley Home Center in Loyalton
- Interactive map of Loyalton, California
- Location in the United States
- Coordinates: 39°40′36″N 120°14′35″W
- Country: United States
- State: California
- County: Sierra
- Incorporated: August 21, 1901

Government
  - Type: Council–manager
  - Mayor: William Mertton
  - City Council: Council Members: Joy Markum; Sue McIlraby; Joe Dines; Jerry Gerow
  - City Clerk: Kathy LeBlanc

Area
  - Total: 0.36 sq mi (0.92 km^{2})
  - Land: 0.36 sq mi (0.92 km^{2})
  - Water: 0 sq mi (0.00 km^{2}) 0%
- Elevation: 4,951 ft (1,509 m)

Population (2020)
  - Total: 740
  - Density: 2,100/sq mi (800/km^{2})
- Time zone: UTC-8 (Pacific (PST))
  - Summer (DST): UTC-7 (PDT)
- ZIP code: 96118
- Area code: 530
- FIPS code: 06-44364
- GNIS feature ID: 0277550
- Website: www.cityofloyalton.org

Loyalton is the only incorporated city in Sierra County, California, United States. At the 2020 census, the population was 740, reflecting a decline of 29 from the 769 counted in 2010. The ZIP code for the community is 96118. The town is near the north extent of State Route 49, which ends at State Route 70 in Vinton. According to Rand-McNally, it is a fifty-mile drive on State Route 49 to the county seat, Downieville. Many of the population are ranchers, loggers, former loggers, or suburbanites who have relocated from the San Francisco Bay Area, Sacramento, and growing Reno–Tahoe area.

== History ==
Loyalton began as a settlement named "Smith's Neck". The name was changed to Loyalton with the onset of the Civil War, expressing the popular sentiment in the area favoring the Union.

The first settlers to the area were largely Swiss and Italian immigrants who established farms in the Sierra Valley starting in the late 1850s. Sawmills were also established to process timber from the nearby mountains. The production of timber and farms goods found a market among the miners in both California and Nevada. By 1901, the Boca & Loyalton Railroad arrived. The "City of Loyalton" was incorporated that same year.

== Geography ==
Loyalton is located at 39°40′36″N 120°14′35″W (39.676558, -120.243157). Elevation above mean sea level for the area was listed as roughly 4,930 feet (1,500 m). The city is located along California State Route 49, the Gold Country Highway.

According to the United States Census Bureau, the city has a total area of 0.36 square miles (0.92 km^{2}), all land.

=== Climate ===
This region experiences warm (but not hot) and dry summers, with no average monthly temperatures above 71.6 °F. According to the Köppen Climate Classification system, Loyalton has a warm-summer Mediterranean climate, abbreviated "Csb" on climate maps.

Climate data for Loyalton, 1991–2020 simulated normals (4951 ft elevation)
Month	Jan	Feb	Mar	Apr	May	Jun	Jul	Aug	Sep	Oct	Nov	Dec	Year
Mean daily maximum °F (°C)	44.1 (6.7)	47.5 (8.6)	53.2 (11.8)	59.4 (15.2)	68.2 (20.1)	77.9 (25.5)	87.1 (30.6)	86.2 (30.1)	79.7 (26.5)	67.6 (19.8)	53.2 (11.8)	43.0 (6.1)	63.9 (17.7)
Daily mean °F (°C)	32.5 (0.3)	35.4 (1.9)	40.3 (4.6)	45.0 (7.2)	52.5 (11.4)	60.3 (15.7)	67.6 (19.8)	66.0 (18.9)	60.1 (15.6)	50.0 (10.0)	39.4 (4.1)	31.8 (−0.1)	48.4 (9.1)
Mean daily minimum °F (°C)	20.8 (−6.2)	23.2 (−4.9)	27.1 (−2.7)	30.7 (−0.7)	36.9 (2.7)	42.6 (5.9)	48.0 (8.9)	46.0 (7.8)	40.5 (4.7)	32.5 (0.3)	25.3 (−3.7)	20.8 (−6.2)	32.9 (0.5)
Average precipitation inches (mm)	3.37 (85.70)	2.84 (72.21)	2.56 (65.04)	1.27 (32.34)	1.53 (38.98)	0.49 (12.46)	0.30 (7.68)	0.28 (7.17)	0.42 (10.55)	1.06 (26.88)	1.69 (42.86)	2.94 (74.74)	18.75 (476.61)
Average dew point °F (°C)	21.6 (−5.8)	22.1 (−5.5)	23.9 (−4.5)	25.3 (−3.7)	30.2 (−1.0)	34.0 (1.1)	38.5 (3.6)	36.1 (2.3)	31.6 (−0.2)	27.3 (−2.6)	23.9 (−4.5)	21.6 (−5.8)	28.0 (−2.2)
Source: PRISM Climate Group

== Demographics ==
Historical population
Census	Pop.	Note	%±
1880	84		—
1910	983		—
1920	442		−55.0%
1930	837		89.4%
1940	925		10.5%
1950	911		−1.5%
1960	936		2.7%
1970	945		1.0%
1980	1,030		9.0%
1990	931		−9.6%
2000	862		−7.4%
2010	769		−10.8%
2020	740		−3.8%
U.S. Decennial Census

=== 2020 ===
At the 2020 census Loyalton had a population of 740. The population density was 2,114.3 inhabitants per square mile (816.3/km^{2}). The racial makeup of Loyalton was 601 (81.2%) White, 4 (0.5%) African American, 9 (1.2%) Native American, 0 (0.0%) Asian, 1 (0.1%) Pacific Islander, 45 (6.1%) from other races, and 80 (10.8%) from two or more races. Hispanic or Latino of any race were 127 people (17.6%).

=== 2010 ===
At the 2010 census Loyalton had a population of 769. The population density was 21 people per square mile (8.1 people/km^{2}). The racial makeup of Loyalton was 701 (91.2%) White, 2 (0.3%) African American, 21 (2.7%) Native American, 0 (0.0%) Asian, 0 (0.0%) Pacific Islander, 20 (2.6%) from other races, and 25 (3.3%) from two or more races. Hispanic or Latino of any race were 108 people (14.0%).

The census reported that 738 people (96.0% of the population) lived in households, no one lived in non-institutionalized group quarters and 31 (4.0%) were institutionalized.

There were 308 households, 86 (27.9%) had children under the age of 18 living in them, 163 (52.9%) were opposite-sex married couples living together, 28 (9.1%) had a female householder with no husband present, 19 (6.2%) had a male householder with no wife present. There were 25 (8.1%) unmarried opposite-sex partnerships, and 0 (0%) same-sex married couples or partnerships. 81 households (26.3%) were one person and 35 (11.4%) had someone living alone who was 65 or older. The average household size was 2.40. There were 210 families (68.2% of households); the average family size was 2.84.

The age distribution was 156 people (20.3%) under the age of 18, 55 people (7.2%) aged 18 to 24, 164 people (21.3%) aged 25 to 44, 243 people (31.6%) aged 45 to 64, and 151 people (19.6%) who were 65 or older. The median age was 46.2 years. For every 100 females, there were 101.3 males. For every 100 females age 18 and over, there were 98.4 males.

There were 371 housing units at an average density of 1,043.6 per square mile, of the occupied units 225 (73.1%) were owner-occupied and 83 (26.9%) were rented. The homeowner vacancy rate was 3.4%; the rental vacancy rate was 8.8%. 526 people (68.4% of the population) lived in owner-occupied housing units and 212 people (27.6%) lived in rental housing units.

=== 2000 ===
At the 2000 census there were 862 people in 323 households, including 235 families, in the city. The population density was 2,516.4 inhabitants per square mile (971.6/km^{2}). There were 347 housing units at an average density of 1,013.0 units per square mile (391.1 units/km^{2}). The racial makeup of the city was 94.90% White, 0.23% African American, 2.67% Native American, 0.12% Asian, 0.58% from other races, and 1.51% from two or more races. Hispanic or Latino of any race were 7.19%.

Of the 323 households 38.4% had children under the age of 18 living with them, 53.6% were married couples living together, 11.1% had a female householder with no husband present, and 27.2% were non-families. 23.8% of households were one person and 10.2% were one person aged 65 or older. The average household size was 2.58 and the average family size was 3.00.

The age distribution was 29.1% under the age of 18, 6.0% from 18 to 24, 24.8% from 25 to 44, 24.4% from 45 to 64, and 15.7% 65 or older. The median age was 39 years. For every 100 females, there were 94.6 males. For every 100 females age 18 and over, there were 91.5 males.

The median income for a household in the city was $34,063, and the median family income was $39,750. Males had a median income of $38,864 versus $23,571 for females. The per capita income for the city was $15,732. About 20.3% of families and 18.1% of the population were below the poverty line, including 22.0% of those under age 18 and 6.7% of those age 65 or over.

== Politics ==
In the state legislature, Loyalton is in the 1st senatorial district, represented by Republican Megan Dahle, and the 1st Assembly district, represented by Republican Heather Hadwick.

Federally, Loyalton is in California's 3rd congressional district, represented by Independent Kevin Kiley.

== Government ==
=== Local ===
Because Loyalton is Sierra County's most populous community and its only incorporated city, the location of the Sierra County Board of Supervisors twice-monthly meetings alternate between Downieville, Sierra County's county seat, and the city of Loyalton.

The City of Loyalton's total expenditures for 2012 were $1.2 million, funded mostly from outside sources such as federal and county grants. Local tax collection revenue that year was $163,000. In 2016, the city recovered over $400,000 that had been embezzled by an employee but it still faces an $80,000 budget shortfall.

In 2012, the Loyalton City Council decided to withdraw from CalPERS because its last employee with a guaranteed pension had retired. The city had been fully paying its required annual contribution of $30,000 and had only four remaining pensioners. CalPERS then demanded $1.6 million from the city. CalPERS publicly uses actuarial present value to calculate member contributions but when a member withdraws it utilizes a non-public calculation to define unfunded liabilities. Loyalton has not yet paid the bill so CalPERS is charging 7.5% annual interest and had sent a final demand letter in September 2016.

== In popular culture ==
Loyalton was extensively used as a filming location in the 1949 movie Beyond the Forest, starring Bette Davis and Joseph Cotten, and directed by King Vidor. Main street business facades are featured, as are the evident owners of the businesses and other townspeople. In the script, the town is referred to as "Loyalton, Wisconsin."
