= California State Route 191 =

Highway in California

State Route 191
- Clark Road
- Map of Butte County in northern California with SR 191 highlighted in red

Route information
- Maintained by Caltrans
- Length: 11.387 mi (18.326 km)
- Existed: 1964–present

Major junctions
- South end: SR 70 near Oroville
- North end: Pearson Road in Paradise

Location
- Country: United States
- State: California
- Counties: Butte

Highway system
- State highways in California; Interstate; US; State; Scenic; History; Pre‑1964; Unconstructed; Deleted; Freeways
← SR 190	→ SR 192

State Route 191 (SR 191) is a state highway in the U.S. state of California. Known also as Clark Road, it is a spur route off of State Route 70 in Butte County, providing a connection to the town of Paradise.

== Route description ==
Route 191 is defined in section 491 of the California Streets and Highways Code, and that the highway is "from Route 70 near Wicks Corner to Paradise".

State Route 191 begins at State Route 70 north of Wicks Corner in Butte County. It then heads northward and intersects Durham-Pentz Road. It then ends at Pearson Road in Paradise.

SR 191 is not part of the National Highway System, a network of highways that are considered essential to the country's economy, defense, and mobility by the Federal Highway Administration.

Construction of State Route 191 was planned in 1962 but was not constructed due to U.S. Route 40 Alternate (now California State Route 70) not being moved upward due to Lake Oroville. Construction started in 1963 when U.S. Route 40 Alternate was moved. The route was completed in 1964 and opened the same year.

== Major intersections ==
Except where prefixed with a letter, postmiles were measured on the road as it was in 1964, based on the alignment that existed at the time, and do not necessarily reflect current mileage. Postmile prefixes include: R reflecting a realignment in the route since then, M indicating a second realignment, L referring to an overlap due to a correction or change, and T indicating postmiles classified as temporary. Segments that remain unconstructed or have been relinquished to local control may be omitted. The entire route is in Butte County.

Location	Postmile	Destinations	Notes
	0.00	Table Mountain Boulevard	Continuation beyond SR 70; former SR 70
	0.00	SR 70 – Quincy, Oroville	South end of SR 191
	3.53	Durham-Pentz Road – Chico	
Paradise	11.39	Pearson Road – Central Paradise	North end of SR 191
Paradise	11.39	Clark Road	Continuation beyond Pearson Road
1.000 mi = 1.609 km; 1.000 km = 0.621 mi
