= Olivehurst, California =

- CDP
- Interactive map of Olivehurst, California
- Location in the United States
- Coordinates: 39°05′44″N 121°33′08″W
- Country: United States
- State: California
- County: Yuba

Area
  - Total: 8.414 sq mi (21.792 km^{2})
  - Land: 8.414 sq mi (21.792 km^{2})
  - Water: 0 sq mi (0 km^{2}) 0%
- Elevation: 66 ft (20 m)

Population (2020)
  - Total: 16,595
  - Density: 1,972.3/sq mi (761.52/km^{2})
- Time zone: UTC-8 (Pacific (PST))
  - Summer (DST): UTC-7 (PDT)
- ZIP code: 95961
- Area code: 530
- FIPS code: 06-53714
- GNIS feature ID: 1659301

Olivehurst (formerly, Denniston) is a census-designated place (CDP) in Yuba County, California, United States. The population was 16,595 at the 2020 census, up from 13,656 at the 2010 census. Olivehurst is located 4 miles (6.4 km) south-southeast of Marysville.

== History ==
Olivehurst was first largely settled by people from the Midwest during the Great Depression who were looking for fertile land, availability of jobs and a better future. People from the town have been known to refer to this group of people as "Okies", a term originally for those from Oklahoma who were escaping the "dust bowl" Oklahoma had become during the Great Depression. This is why some of the streets are named after cities in Oklahoma. These "Okies" were following migrant workers such as those of Chinese, Japanese, Filipino, Mexican and Native American background.

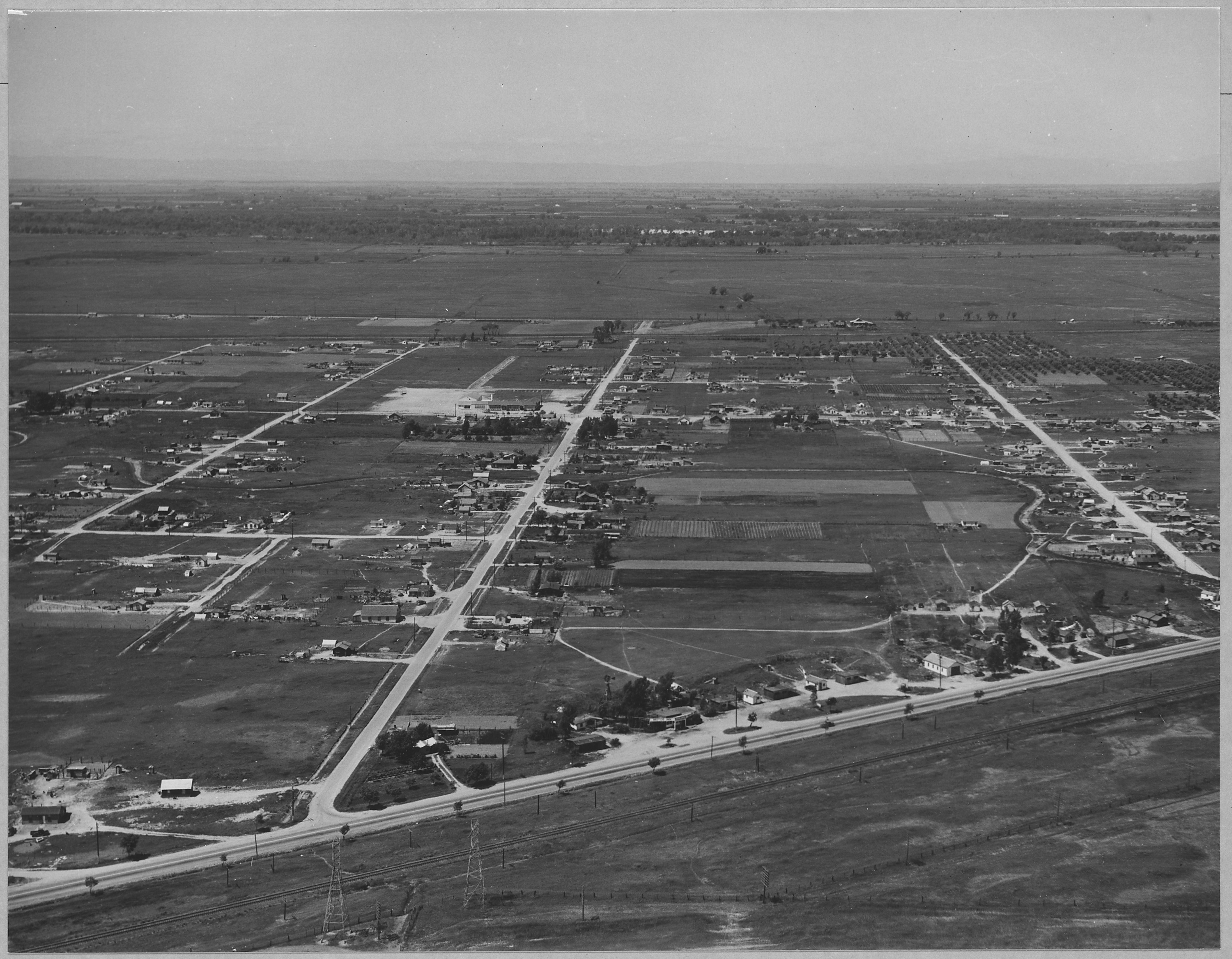
Olivehurst in 1940

The economy has been largely focused on agriculture, but, since the 1950s, jobs have been increasingly focused on mill and manufacturing work. Today's economy is centered on a "commuter economy" where many of the residents work outside of the town.

A post office opened at Olivehurst in 1941.

Olivehurst was the site of the Lindhurst High School shooting in 1992, which left four dead and ten others injured.

== Geography ==
Olivehurst is located at 39°05′44″N 121°33′08″W.

According to the United States Census Bureau, the CDP has a total area of 8.4 square miles (21.8 km^{2}), all land.

Olivehurst is located near the confluence of the Yuba and Feather rivers. In 1987, a severe flood of the Yuba River, complete with a broken levee, devastated Olivehurst, followed by similar devastation from the 1997 Merced River flood. Businesses left the area, and unemployment skyrocketed.

== Demographics ==
Historical population
Census	Pop.	Note	%±
1950	3,588		—
1960	4,835		34.8%
1970	8,100		67.5%
1980	8,929		10.2%
1990	9,738		9.1%
2000	11,061		13.6%
2010	13,656		23.5%
2020	16,595		21.5%
U.S. Decennial Census; 1860–1870 1880-1890; 1900 1910 1920; 1930 1940 1950; 1960 1970 1980; 1990 2000 2010; 2020

Olivehurst first appeared as an unincorporated community in the 1950 U.S. census; and then as a census designated place in the 1980 U.S. census.

=== 2020 census ===
As of the 2020 census, Olivehurst had a population of 16,595 and a population density of 1,972.3 inhabitants per square mile (761.5/km^{2}). The median age was 32.3 years. 30.1% of residents were under the age of 18, 9.1% were aged 18 to 24, 28.0% were aged 25 to 44, 22.1% were aged 45 to 64, and 10.7% were 65 years of age or older. For every 100 females there were 99.4 males, and for every 100 females age 18 and over there were 97.9 males age 18 and over.

The census reported that 99.7% of the population lived in households, 0.3% lived in non-institutionalized group quarters, and no one was institutionalized. In addition, 96.7% of residents lived in urban areas, while 3.3% lived in rural areas.

There were 5,002 households in Olivehurst, of which 45.4% had children under the age of 18 living in them. Of all households, 49.3% were married-couple households, 9.6% were cohabiting couple households, 17.9% had a male householder and no spouse or partner present, and 23.2% had a female householder and no spouse or partner present. About 18.0% of households were made up of individuals, and 7.2% had someone living alone who was 65 years of age or older. The average household size was 3.31. There were 3,786 families (75.7% of all households).

There were 5,257 housing units at an average density of 624.8 units per square mile (241.2 units/km^{2}), of which 4.9% were vacant and 95.1% were occupied. Of the occupied units, 65.7% were owner-occupied and 34.3% were occupied by renters. The homeowner vacancy rate was 1.7% and the rental vacancy rate was 4.0%.

Racial composition as of the 2020 census
Race	Number	Percent
White	7,885	47.5%
Black or African American	595	3.6%
American Indian and Alaska Native	379	2.3%
Asian	1,220	7.4%
Native Hawaiian and Other Pacific Islander	81	0.5%
Some other race	3,918	23.6%
Two or more races	2,517	15.2%
Hispanic or Latino (of any race)	6,705	40.4%

=== Demographic estimates ===
In 2023, the US Census Bureau estimated that 11.3% of the population were foreign-born. Of all people aged 5 or older, 67.3% spoke only English at home, 25.2% spoke Spanish, 1.7% spoke other Indo-European languages, and 5.9% spoke Asian or Pacific Islander languages. Of those aged 25 or older, 81.0% were high school graduates and 15.3% had a bachelor's degree.

=== Income and poverty ===
The median household income in 2023 was $80,477, and the per capita income was $31,263. About 7.2% of families and 9.1% of the population were below the poverty line.

=== 2010 census ===
At the 2010 census Olivehurst had a population of 13,656. The population density was 1,827.5 per square mile (705.6/km^{2})). The racial make-up was 8,534 (62.5%) White, 322 (2.4%) African American, 399 (2.9%) Native American, 772 (5.7%) Asian, 61 (0.4%) Pacific Islander, 2,623 (19.2%) from other races and 945 (6.9%) from two or more races. Hispanic or Latino of any race were 4,994 persons (36.6%).

The census reported that 13,610 people (99.7% of the population) lived in households, 46 (0.3%) lived in non-institutionalized group quarters and no one was institutionalized. There were 4,120 households, of which 1,961 (47.6%) had children under the age of 18 living in them, 2,137 (51.9%) were opposite-sex married couples living together, 713 (17.3%) had a female householder with no husband present and 316 (7.7%) had a male householder with no wife present. There were 380 (9.2%) unmarried opposite-sex partnerships and 29 (0.7%) same-sex married couples or partnerships. 726 households (17.6%) were one person and 243 (5.9%) had someone living alone who was 65 or older. The average household size was 3.30. There were 3,166 families (76.8% of households); the average family size was 3.71.

The age distribution was 4,339 people (31.8%) under the age of 18, 1,469 people (10.8%) aged 18 to 24, 3,767 people (27.6%) aged 25 to 44, 2,937 people (21.5%) aged 45 to 64, and 1,144 people (8.4%) who were 65 or older. The median age was 29.9 years. For every 100 females, there were 100.5 males. For every 100 females age 18 and over, there were 99.5 males.

There were 4,487 housing units at an average density of 600.5 per square mile (231.9/km^{2}). Of the occupied units, 2,538 (61.6%) were owner-occupied and 1,582 (38.4%) were rented. The homeowner vacancy rate was 3.8%; the rental vacancy rate was 5.0%. 8,029 people (58.8% of the population) lived in owner-occupied housing units and 5,581 people (40.9%) lived in rental housing units.

== Government ==
In the California State Legislature, Olivehurst is in the 1st senatorial district, represented by Republican Megan Dahle, and in the 3rd Assembly district, represented by Vacant.

In the United States House of Representatives, Olivehurst is in California's 1st congressional district, represented by Republican James Gallagher.

== Education ==
Olivehurst is served by Marysville Joint Unified School District. There are several elementary schools located in the town in addition to Lindhurst High School, one of the two in the district.

== Notable people ==
- Phil Baugh - musician
