= West Branch Feather River =

Location
- Country: United States
- State: California
- Region: North Fork Feather Watershed

Physical characteristics
- Source: Lassen National Forest
  - location: Butte County
- Mouth: Lake Oroville, West Arm^{A}
- Basin size: 282 sq mi (730 km^{2})
- ^{A}Prior to Oroville Dam construction, the West Branch flowed to its confluence with the North Fork Feather River.

The West Branch (or West Fork) Feather River is a Lake Oroville tributary that flows generally north-to-south in the North Fork Feather Watershed near the watershed's drainage divide with the Mills-Big Chico Watershed and Upper Butte Watershed.

Toadtown development & DeSabla Regional Bundle
Up to 125 cu ft/s (3.5 m^{3}/s) of the West Branch is diverted to the 8.66 mi (13.94 km) Hendricks Canal of the Toadtown development, and the Magalia 73 Dam conveys water via a sequence of DeSabla Regional Bundle facilities from the Upper Miocene Canal to Kunkle Reservoir (Lime Saddle Powerhouse near Lake Oroville), then via the Middle Miocene Canal to the Coal Canyon Powerhouse, and then to the Oroville–Thermalito Complex.

West Branch Feather River course This list is incomplete; you can help by expanding it.
description	coordinates
headpoint	
source, Lassen NF	40°4′40″N 121°25′24″W
waterbody, Snag Lake	
valley, Coon Hollow	
confluence, Philbrook Creek	
border, Lassen NF	
confluence, Fish Creek	
confluence, Last Chance Creek	
diversion, Hendricks Canal	
confluence, Big Kimshew Creek	
confluence, Little West Fork	
confluence, Concow Creek	
mouth, West Arm Lake Oroville	
mouth (former), North Fork	39.666499°N 121.496773°W
