= Beckwourth Pass =

Mountain pass in the Sierra Nevada mountain range

- Beckwourth Pass viewed looking westward through the pass. The highway arcing up and crossing over the pass is California State Route 70. The mountain viewed in the background through the saddle of the pass is Beckwourth Peak.

- Location within California
- Elevation: 5,221 ft (1,591 m)
- Traversed by: SR 70; Feather River Route

Location
- Location: Plumas County
- Range: Sierra Nevada (U.S.)
- Coordinates: 39°47′30″N 120°6′28″W

California Historical Landmark
- Reference no.: 336

Beckwourth Pass is the lowest mountain pass in the Sierra Nevada mountain range at an elevation of 5,221 feet (1,591 m).

== Geography ==
Beckwourth Pass is located at the north eastern edge of Sierra Valley at Chilcoot-Vinton, California near the border between Plumas County and Lassen County, 20 miles (32 km) east of Portola, California and 25 miles (40 km) northwest of Reno, Nevada.

California State Route 70 crosses over Beckwourth Pass. The Feather River Route of the former Western Pacific Railroad, now the Union Pacific Railroad, crosses beneath the pass via the Chilcoot Tunnel. Route 70 and the railroad line provide an alternate route between Sacramento, California and Reno, Nevada when Interstate 80 and the Overland Route, which cross the Sierra Nevada near Donner Pass, are impassable due to winter storms.

== History ==
James Beckwourth discovered Beckwourth Pass in 1850. In 1851, he improved the path into Sierra Valley to create his Beckwourth Trail. The trail ran from Truckee Meadows (what is now known as Sparks, Nevada) through the pass into California and on to Marysville.

In late summer of 1851, James Beckwourth led the first wagon train of settlers along the Beckwourth Trail into Marysville.

One of the settlers in Beckwourth's first wagon train was ten-year-old Josephine Donna Smith. Later, she took the name Ina Coolbrith, "Ina" is a diminutive name for Josephine and "Coolbrith" was her mother's maiden name. In 1915, Coolbrith would become California's first Poet Laureate.

Between 1851 and 1854, 1,200 emigrants traveled the Beckwourth Trail, leading 12,000 head of cattle, 700 sheep, and 500 horses. However, in 1854, use dropped sharply when the Beckwourth Trail became a toll road. The toll cost to move a ton of freight from Bidwell Bar to Quincy was about $18. (Note: equivalent to $645 in 2025 adjusted for inflation) This toll cost made using the Beckwourth Road an expensive enterprise and the use of the Beckwourth Trail declined.

Between 1895 and 1916, the pass was used by the Sierra Valley & Mohawk Railway narrow gauge. The abandoned right-of-way is still visible on the south and eastern slope of the pass.

In 1906, the Chilcoot Tunnel, with a length of 6,002 feet (1,829 m), was constructed beneath Beckwourth Pass by the Western Pacific Railway as part of its Feather River Route. In 1916, after the line emerged from receivership, the Western Pacific Railway was renamed as the Western Pacific Railroad.

In 1937, a bronze plaque was erected at Beckwourth Pass by the Native Daughters of the Golden West to commemorate the discoverer and the pioneers who passed along the trail.

On August 8, 1939, Beckwourth Pass was designated as California Historical Landmark Number 336.

In 1982, the Western Pacific Railroad was acquired by the Union Pacific Corporation and it was merged into the Union Pacific Railroad. The former Western Pacific Railroad's Feather River Route is owned and operated by the Union Pacific Railroad.

== See also ==
- Ina Coolbrith
- Mount Ina Coolbrith
- James P. Beckwourth
