= Nora McCaffrey =

American clubwoman

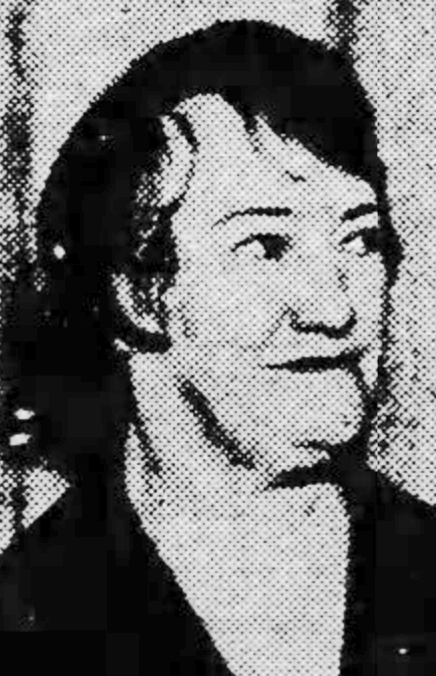
- McCaffrey, from a 1929 newspaper
- Born: Nora Moss; September 25, 1879 near Fort Bridger, Wyoming, U.S.
- Died: November 25, 1958 (age 79); Carmel, California, U.S.
- Other names: Nora Law, Nora Hamilton
- Occupations: Writer, clubwoman, educator

Nora H. Moss McCaffrey Law Hamilton (September 25, 1879 – November 1958) was an American writer, educator, and clubwoman, based in Berkeley, Oakland, and Carmel-by-the-Sea, California.

== Early life and education ==
Nora Moss was born in a log cabin near Fort Bridger, Wyoming, the daughter of William Cartier Moss and Josephine Curtis Moss. Her father was a Union Army veteran of the American Civil War, and a teacher in Wyoming and California. She graduated from Kern County Union High School, and from the University of California, Berkeley.

== Career ==
McCaffrey taught English in the Oakland public schools from 1918 to 1945; she also advised student publications, sponsored a stamp collecting club, and did publicity for student events. In the 1940s, she wrote a column about the residents of Carmel-by-the-Sea for The Spectator, a weekly newspaper. She also wrote columns for the Seaside News-Sentinel, Carmel Pine Cone, and Monterey County Herald, and contributed to "The Educational Whirl", a humor feature in an education journal.

During World War II McCaffrey was a counselor in a YWCA farm labor camp for girls near Hollister. She received an award from the Monterey Peninsula USO, for meritorious service, for her weekly stint playing cards with servicemen. She was a member of the California Writers Club and the Berkeley Short Story Club, and publicity chair of the Carmel Woman's Club.

== Publications ==
- "Mrs. Hamlet's Soliloquy" (1924, poem)
- "License Plates Motivate Letters" (1938, article)
- "Class Parties and 'West Enders'" (1939, article)
- "Yellowstone Park Diorama is Section of Wyoming's Exhibit at Exposition" (1939)
- "The Educational Whirl" (1939, 1940, humor)
- "Stamp Club Asks for New Members" (1951)

== Personal life ==
Moss married three times. She had two children with her first husband, James E. McCaffrey; a son Edwin, who died in 1941, and a daughter Joellyn. Her second husband was Robert E. Law; they divorced in 1937. Her final husband was retired sheriff Robert Hamilton; they were childhood friends in Wyoming, but only married in June 1958. She died in November 1958, at the age of 80, in Carmel. Her nephew Stanley McCaffrey was president of the University of the Pacific from 1971 to 1987. Her papers are in the Berkeley Historical Society.
