= GUE =

GUE may refer to:

- Gue, a musical instrument
- Belle Willey Gue (1860–1944), American writer
- Benjamin F. Gue (1828–1904), American newspaper editor and politician
- European United Left (1994–95) (French: Gauche unitaire européenne)
- European United Left–Nordic Green Left (GUE/NGL), a democratic-socialist political group in the European Parliament
- Gaussian unitary ensemble
- Geneon Universal Entertainment, a Japanese entertainment company
- Global Underwater Explorers, an American diving organization
- Great Underground Empire, a fictional kingdom in the Zorkuniverse
- Guernsey
- Gue (Lahul and Spiti), a village in Lahaul and Spiti district in India
- Guè, Italian hip hop musician
- Grand unification epoch
