= Hester A. Benedict =

American writer (1838–1926)

Hester A. Dickinson
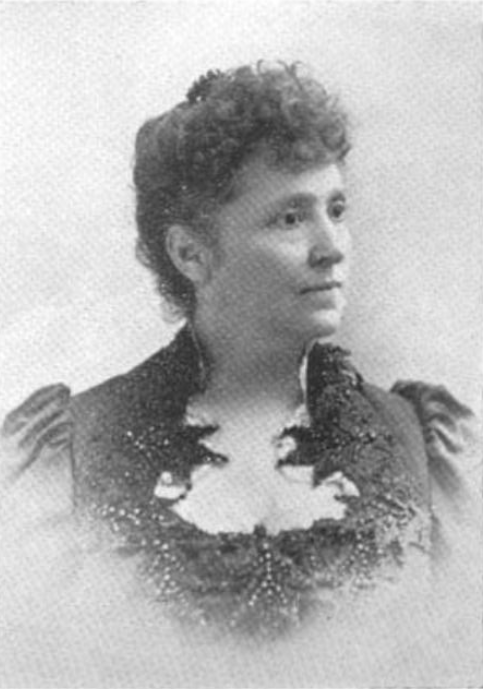
- Born: Esther A. Baldwin; October 2, 1838; Streetsboro, Ohio, U.S.
- Died: December 28, 1921 (aged 83)
- Education: Western Reserve Seminary
- Occupations: poet; writer
- Spouses: Harmon Benedict (m. 1856); Peter Tracy Dickinson (m. 1877; died 1903)
- Writing career
- Pen name: Hester A. Benedict

Hester A. Benedict (née, Baldwin; after first marriage, Benedict; after second marriage, Dickinson; October 2, 1838 – December 28, 1921) was an American poet and writer. She had a literary reputation in the East before her removal to California where she served as president of the Pacific Coast Women's Press Association in San Francisco. Dickinson's works included, Vesta (1872), Fagots (1895), and Songs En Route (1911). After her second marriage, she retained "Hester A. Benedict" as a literary name, and also used it as a pen name in her second book, but not for the third one.

== Early life and education ==
Esther (nickname, "Hester") A. Baldwin was born in Streetsboro, Portage County, Ohio, October 2, 1838. Her parents were Harvey Baldwin (1796–1882) and Lucinda (Brown) Baldwin (1814–1898). Hester's siblings included Ellen, Isabella, and Wesley.

She was an attentive reader, choosing many of the best authors, as well as current literature for her entertainment. She readily assimilated what she read, and made it her own. Her early poetical efforts were promising. Benedict was educated under private tutors and in Western Reserve Seminary.

== Career ==
Benedict's first poem was published when she was seven years old. As a young woman, she was a contributor to the New York City and Philadelphia magazines.

On December 27, 1856, at Portage, Ohio, she married Harmon Benedict. This was soon followed by the birth of a daughter; the child died young. Thereafter, she resolved to devote her life to literature. Some of her first productions appeared, with commendation, in the village newspaper. She afterwards moved to New York, and became known as an acceptable and favorite contributor to many literary publications. At length, she applied herself to the production of her poem, "Vesta", which, along with other poems, was issued in book form (Vesta) in Philadelphia. The book was received favorably by the public.

On May 30, 1877, in Sacramento, California, she married Col. Peter Tracy Dickinson, manager of the American Pipe Company of San Francisco. On June 1, news of their arrival in San Francisco via an overland train included mention that Mrs. Dickinson's nom de plume was "Hester, a Benedict".

They made their home for many years in Alameda, California. In 1880, Col. and Mrs. Dickinson went to Japan, where they spent one year and were the guests of the Mikado. There, Col. Dickinson made a close study of the commercial affairs of Japan, while Benedict served as a correspondent from for the New York Mail. The Dickinsons toured the world with General Ulysses S. Grant's party. Her acquaintance with people in literary circles, in the U.S. and abroad, was wide. She was a close friend of Ina Coolbrith.

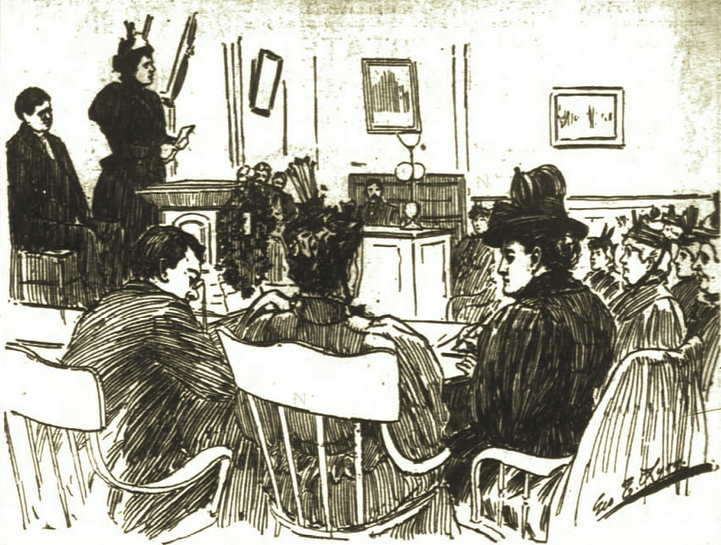
Dickinson giving the opening address at the Kate Field Memorial Exercises (1896)

Dickinson contributed voluminously to such papers as the Waverly under the name of Hester A. Benedict. She was a founder of the California Writers Club, and for several terms, served on the board of directors and later, was elected to an honorary vice-presidency. For two years, she served as president of the Pacific Coast Women's Press Association. News of Dickinson's 1897 re-election was marred by a notice in the Chronicle (May 15, 1897) that "all is not harmony in the Pacific Coast Women's Press Association since the re-election of Mrs. Hester A. Dickinson of 1523 Willow street as its President". Within days, resolutions were unanimously adopted by the organization in support of Dickinson.

== Personal life ==
For years, Dickinson was active in church and civic circles in Alameda. When her health failed two or three years before her death, Dickinson was placed in a sanitarium, where her death occurred December 28, 1921. Her ashes were consigned to the waters of the Golden Gate at a ceremony conducted October 24, 1926, by the California Writers Club in accordance with her will.

== Selected works ==
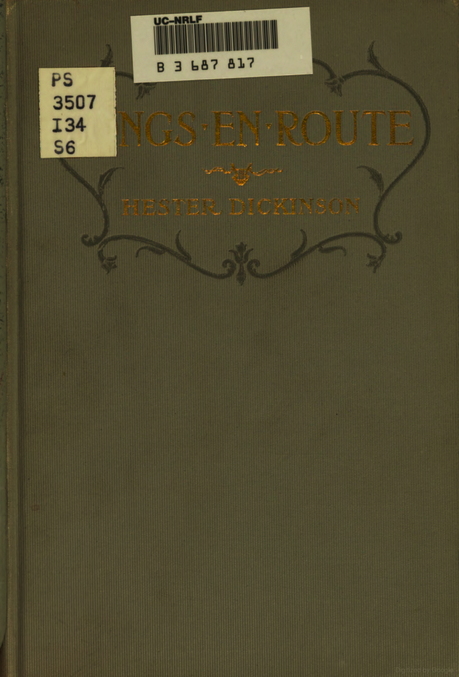

=== By Hester A. Benedict ===
- Vesta (1872) (Text)
- Fagots (1895) (Text)

=== By Hester Dickinson ===
- Songs En Route (1911) (Text)
