= Anna Kalfus Spero =

American poet (1855–1947)

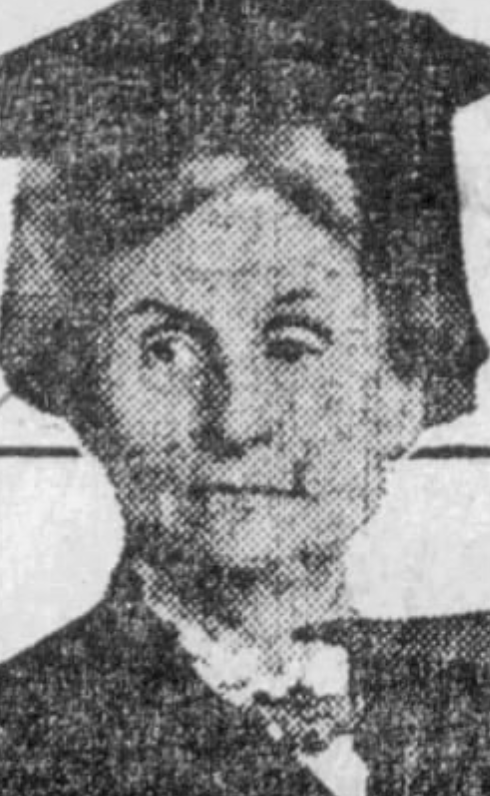
- Spero, from a 1912 newspaper
- Born: Anna Fredericka Kalmus; April 15, 1855; Shepherdsville, Kentucky, U.S.
- Died: May 1, 1947 (aged 92); Berkeley, California, U.S.
- Other name: Anna DeJarnette
- Occupations: Poet, suffragist, clubwoman

Anna Fredericka Kalfus DeJarnette Spero (April 15, 1855 – May 1, 1947) was an American poet, clubwoman, and suffragist from Kentucky, based most of her life in San Jose and Berkeley, California.

== Early life and education ==
Kalfus was born in Shepherdsville, Kentucky, the daughter of Henry Frederick Kalfus and Elizabeth Virginia Birkhead Kalfus. Her father was a physician. She attended Louisville Girls High School, and helped to organize the school's alumnae organization. Later she earned a degree from the University of California in 1912, the same year that both of her children graduated from law school there.

== Career ==
Spero taught school in Elizabethtown and Louisville as a young woman. In her forties, she moved to California with her children. She owned and edited a weekly paper in San Jose, and was a member of the San Jose Women's Club, active in suffrage work in the 1890s. At the Biennial of the General Federation of Women's Clubs in Denver in 1898, Spero "gave a talk on Western journalism that electrified her audience," according to a report in The Delineator. "Perhaps nobody could remember much of her subject matter afterwards, but her wonderful flow of words, her enthusiasm and her powerful magnetism carried her audience by storm."

In 1900 she attended the state convention of the California Woman's Suffrage Association. She chaired the poetry section of the California Writers Club and was a member of the Berkeley Short Story Club and the Civic League of Oakland. She was a life member of the National Education Association.

== Publications ==
Spero was considered a noted California woman poet, alongside Ina Coolbrith, Ruth Comfort Mitchell, and Sara Bard Field. Her poems and stories were published in national periodicals including Sunset, Overland Monthly, The Wanderer, and Poetry of Today. Her 1931 collection Dreams in the Dark was described as "a record of dream consciousness", with verses based on her actual dreams. "I sleep with pencil and paper under my pillow," she explained, "as at any stir the words go away."

- "A Translation in Souls" (1898, short story)
- "A Son of Comptche" (1904, short story)
- The Honor of Breath Feather (1914, fiction)
- "The Rustle in the House", "In My Dreams", "The Moon of Autumn Leaves", and "Illusion" (1924, poems)
- "The Delayed Knight", "Lines to a Western Woman", "In Florida", "Source" (1925, poems)
- "Upon a Height" and "A Day of Life" (1927, poems)
- "Cloudy" (1929, poem)
- Dreams in the Dark (1931, poetry collection)
- "To a Lizard in the Desert", "The Wind is Sweet", "I'd Follow Blue-Birds", and "Source" (1932, poems)

== Personal life ==
Kalfus married James Silas DeJarnette in 1887; they had two children. Her second husband was reporter Schuyler Colfax Spero; they married in 1896. Her son died in 1914. She died in 1947, at the age of 92, in Berkeley.
