= Mount Ina Coolbrith =

Mountain in Sierra County, California, U.S.

- Summit Peak
- Location within California Location within the United States

Highest point
- Elevation: 8,064 ft (2,458 m) NAVD 88
- Prominence: 1,118 ft (341 m)
- Coordinates: 39°42′09″N 120°08′36″W

Geography
- Location: Sierra County, California, U.S.

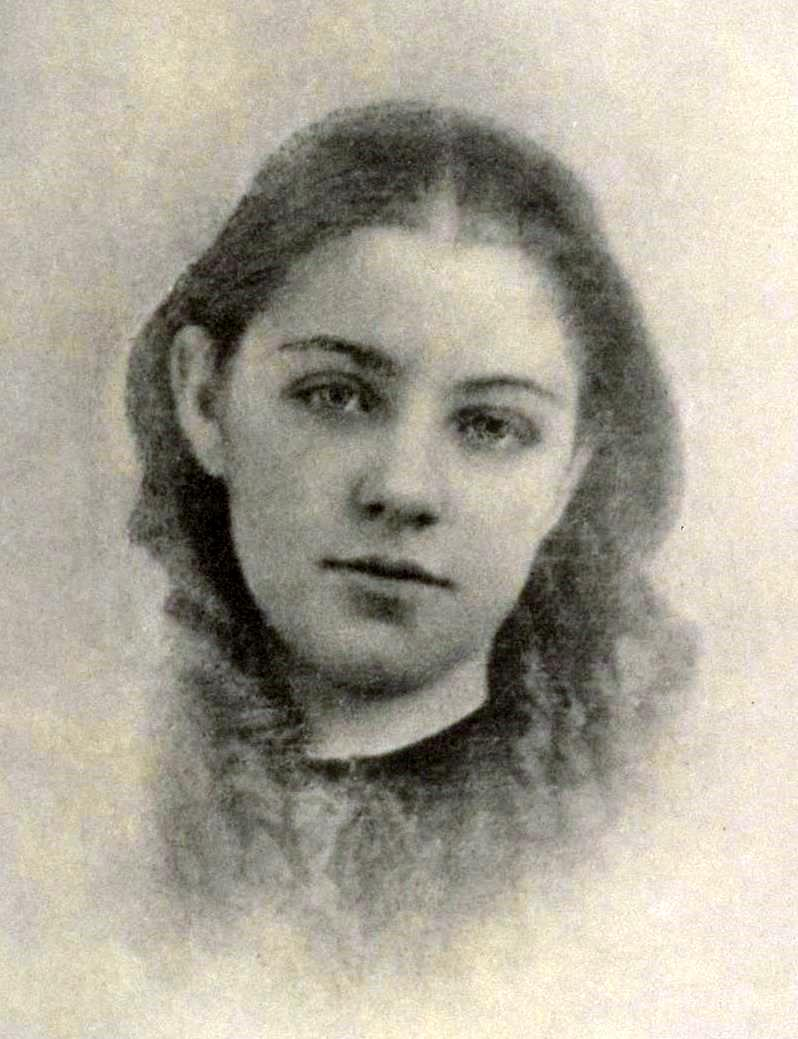
Ina Coolbrith as a young girl

Mount Ina Coolbrith (formerly Summit Peak) is a mountain of the Sierra Nevada, near the Nevada border in Sierra County, Northern California.

== Name ==
The mountain is visible from Beckwourth Pass through which Ina Coolbrith traveled, at the age of 11, with a party led by James Beckwourth. She would later claim to have been the first white child brought into California. The mountain was officially renamed in 1932 by the United States Geographic Board with the support of the California State Legislature and the Western Pacific Railroad.

== Geography ==
Mount Ina Coolbrith is located on the eastern edge of Sierra Valley in the Humboldt-Toiyabe National Forest, 6.5 miles (10.5 km) south southeast of Beckwourth Pass, 5.5 miles (8.9 km) northeast of Loyalton, and 5.8 miles (9.3 km) west of Highway 395 . Most of the mountain, including its summit, is in Sierra County, California; however, the lower northern flanks extend into Plumas County and Lassen County.

== See also ==
- Category:Mountains of Sierra County, California
- Category:Mountains of the Sierra Nevada (United States)
