= Thomas Bowles Shannon =

American politician

Thomas B. Shannon
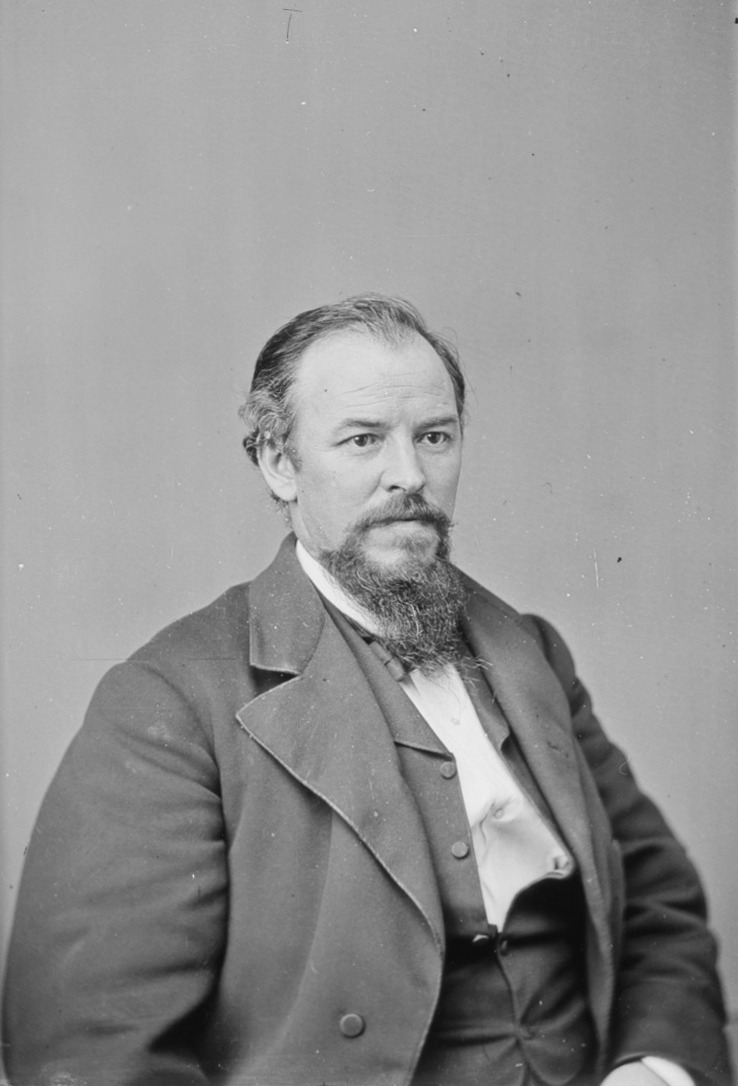
- Portrait by Brady c. 1860–1865

Collector of the Port of San Francisco
- In office May 8, 1872 – June 19, 1880
- Appointed by: Ulysses S. Grant
- Preceded by: Timothy Guy Phelps
- Succeeded by: Eugene L. Sullivan

Surveyor of the Port of San Francisco
- In office July 27, 1865 – March 16, 1870
- Appointed by: Andrew Johnson
- Preceded by: John T. McLean
- Succeeded by: Charles Clayton

Member of the U.S. House of Representatives from California's at-large district
- In office March 4, 1863 – March 3, 1865
- Preceded by: Aaron A. Sargent
- Succeeded by: John Bidwell

19th Speaker of the California State Assembly
- In office December 1871 – April 1872
- Preceded by: George H. Rogers
- Succeeded by: Morris M. Estee

Member of the California State Assembly
- In office December 4, 1871 – December 1, 1873
- Preceded by: Multi-member district
- Succeeded by: Multi-member district
- Constituency: 8th district
- In office January 7, 1861 – January 6, 1862
- Preceded by: Multi-member district
- Succeeded by: Multi-member district
- Constituency: 24th district
- In office January 4, 1858 – January 2, 1860
- Preceded by: Multi-member district
- Succeeded by: Multi-member district
- Constituency: 14th district

Member of the California Senate from the 24th district
- In office January 6, 1862 – January 5, 1863
- Preceded by: Multi-member district
- Succeeded by: F. M. Smith

Personal details
- Born: Thomas Bowles Shannon; September 21, 1827 Westmoreland County, Pennsylvania, U.S.
- Died: February 22, 1897 (aged 69) San Francisco, California, U.S.
- Party: Republican; Democratic (formerly), Whig (formerly)

Thomas Bowles Shannon (September 21, 1827 – February 21, 1897) was an American merchant and politician who represented California in the U.S. House of Representatives from 1863 to 1865. He also several terms in the California State Legislature, including four months as speaker.

== Early life ==
Shannon was born on September 21, 1827, in Westmoreland County, Pennsylvania. He attended the Westmoreland County public schools. He moved to Illinois in 1844 and by 1849 he moved during the California Gold Rush, to California. There he engaged in mining and mercantile pursuits in Plumas County in California.

== Early political career ==
Shannon was originally a Whig in politics, but later supported the Free Soil wing of the Democratic Party, serving as a member of its California Central Committee in 1860. He later joined the Republican Party after the outbreak of the Civil War. He was a member of the California State Assembly in 1858, 1859, and 1861, and the California State Senate in 1862, representing Plumas County. He supported black testimony in the California courts in 1862 and 1863, a position the Democrats unsuccessfully used against him as an issue in his third campaign for the Assembly and his subsequent campaign for Congress.

== House of Representatives ==
Running as a supporter of Senator John Conness, Shannon was elected as a Republican to the thirty-eighth Congress (March 4, 1863 – March 3, 1865), in which he served as chairman of the Committee on Expenditures in the Department of the Interior. As a congressman he participated little in debate, but voted consistently for administration measures. Due to political turmoil in California over Conness, Shannon was not a candidate for reelection in 1864. He was selected as a California Congressional delegate for the funeral of Abraham Lincoln, in which capacity he participated in speeches delivered outside the Ohio Statehouse in Columbus, Ohio.

== Later career ==
Illustration of Shannon published in The San Francisco Call, September 16, 1894

Shannon was appointed surveyor of the Port of San Francisco by President Andrew Johnson on July 27, 1865, and served until March 16, 1870. He was again a member of the State Assembly, representing San Francisco, in 1871 and 1872, serving as the Speaker of the Assembly the first year.

Shannon was later appointed collector of the Port of San Francisco by President Ulysses S. Grant on May 8, 1872, serving until June 19, 1880, after which he resumed his mercantile pursuits. He was the first collector in the history of the port to be appointed to second term.

== Death and burial ==
Shannon died in San Francisco, California, on February 21, 1897. His body was originally buried in the Masonic Cemetery, but reburied in 1931 at Woodlawn Memorial Park Cemetery in Colma, California.

U.S. House of Representatives
Preceded by Frederick Low	Member of the U.S. House of Representatives from California's at-large congressional district 1863–1865	Seat eliminated
Political offices
Preceded by George H. Rogers	Speaker of the California State Assembly; December 1871–April 1872	Succeeded by Morris M. Estee
