= Oakland Public Library =

Public library system in California, US

Coordinates: 37°48′2.8″N 122°15′49.8″W

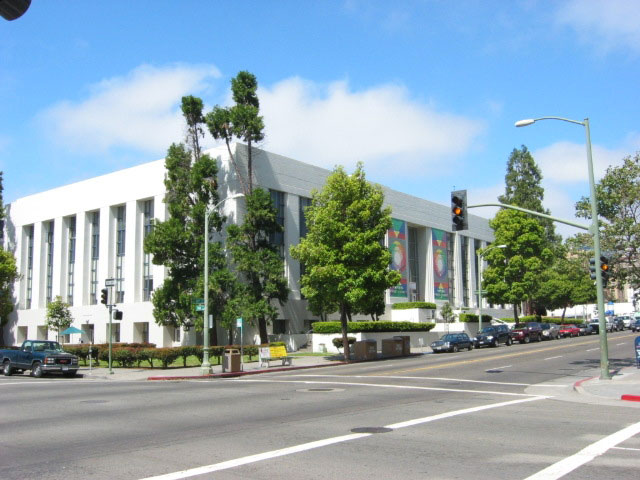
- The Oakland Public Library's main library is in Downtown Oakland.
- Location: Oakland, California, United States
- Established: 1878

Access and use
- Population served: 457,800

Other information
- Budget: $39,825,248 (2022)
- Website: www.oaklandlibrary.org

The Oakland Public Library is the public library in Oakland, California. Opened in 1878, the Oakland Public Library currently serves the city of Oakland, along with smaller neighboring cities Emeryville and Piedmont. The Oakland Public Library has the largest collection of any public library in the East Bay, featuring approximately 1.5 million items. It consists of a main library located in downtown Oakland, and 16 branch libraries throughout the city (see below).

Special services within the Oakland Public Library system include the African American Museum and Library at Oakland (AAMLO), the Second Start Adult Literacy Program, and the Tool Lending Library.

== History ==
The Oakland Library Association was formed in 1868 as a subscription library. The poet Ina Coolbrith was hired as librarian in 1873. In 1878, the library was reformed as the Oakland Free Library, the second public library created in California under the Rogers Free Library Act. (Eureka was first.) With her personal style, Coolbrith nurtured the reading habits of many young Oakland students including Jack London and Isadora Duncan. Coolbrith's nephew Henry Frank Peterson replaced Coolbrith in 1892, greatly expanding the library's circulation as well as improving accessibility by completing a card catalog system. Charles S. Greene, poet and former editor of the Overland Monthly, became librarian in 1899 and served until 1926. Mabel W. Thomas, who served as assistant librarian and chief reference librarian under Greene, and retired in 1948, began a collection of books, periodicals, and other material that were the foundation of the California Room in the 1940s and are now contained in the well-used Oakland History Center.

== Main Library ==
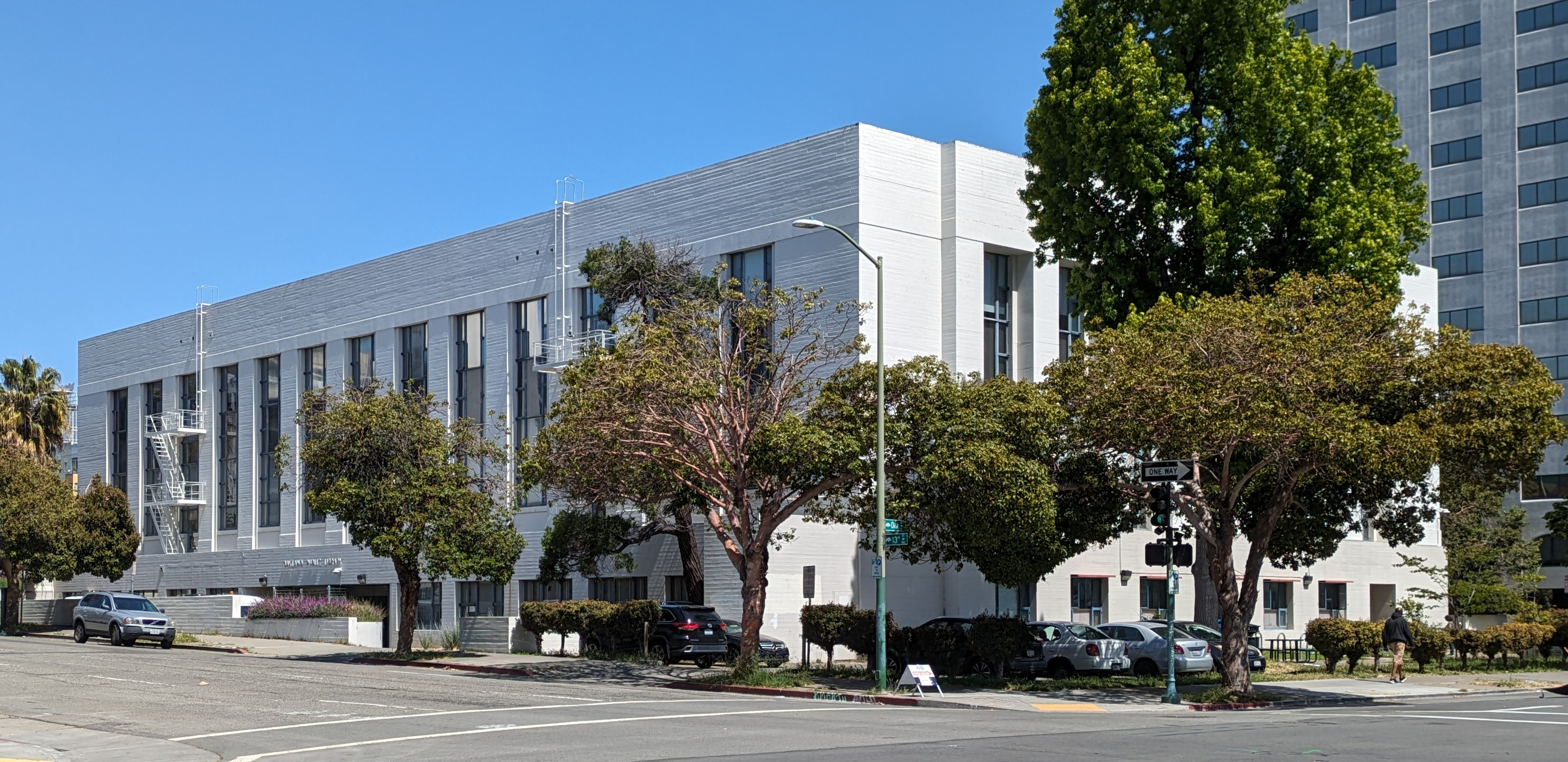
Main Library

The Main Library has occupied its present location at 125 14th Street near Lake Merritt since 1951. It is one of the largest public library facilities in the Bay Area. It features popular reading materials, business resources, government publications, videos/DVDs/CDs, maps, and a computer lab for the public. It also houses the Oakland History Room, including primary materials and unique books that explore the history of the East Bay; a large and active Children’s Room; and the TeenZone. Adaptive technology is available for persons with disabilities at this and other sites.

After a 6 month closure in mid-2024 during which the roof, lighting and flooring were renovated, the Main Library re-opened to the public in December 2024.

== Branches ==
The Oakland Public Library has 16 branches. The following list includes the date each branch was established and, if the branch has since moved, the year the current location opened.

- 81st Avenue (2011), 1021 81st Avenue
  - This branch is jointly operated with the Oakland Unified School District and serves two elementary schools as well as the neighborhood. Construction funding included grants through the California Reading and Literacy Improvement and Public Library Construction and Renovation Bond Act of 2000 (aka Proposition 14).

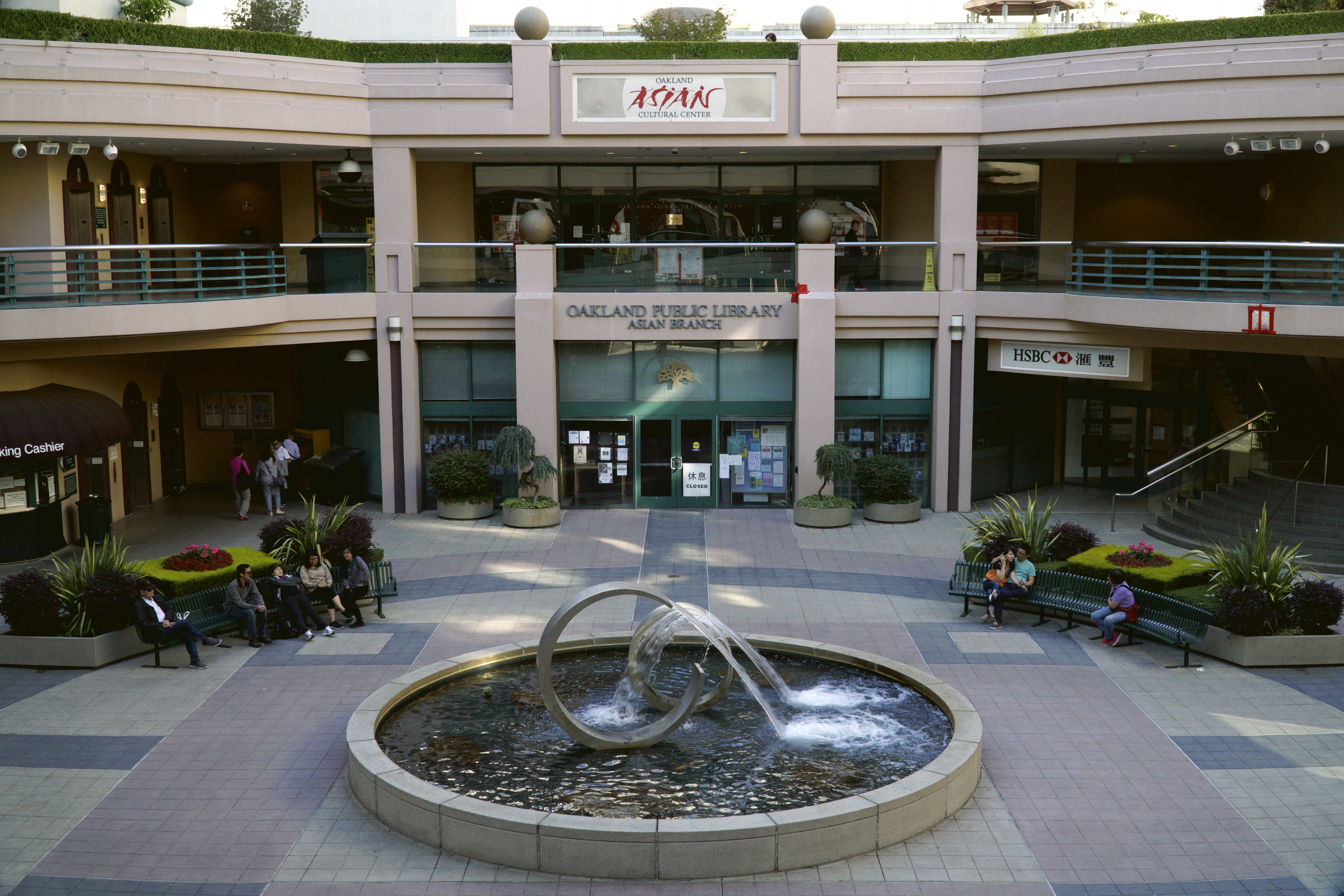
Asian branch

- Asian (1976, current location 1995), 388 9th Street, Suite 190
- Brookfield (1957, current location 1992), 9255 Edes Avenue
- Dimond (1915, current location 1980), 3565 Fruitvale Avenue
- Eastmont (1945, current location 1998), Eastmont Town Center, 7200 Bancroft Avenue, Suite 211
- Elmhurst (1911, current location 1949), 1427 88th Avenue
- Fruitvale (1966, current location 2004), 3301 East 12th Street, Suite 271
  - Established in 1966 as the Latin American Library Branch. It was one of the first public libraries in the United States to offer services and materials in Spanish and was the first library branch exclusively dedicated to the Spanish-speaking community in the United States.
  - In 2002, community members successfully petitioned to have the Latin American Branch named after labor leader César E. Chávez. After sexual assault allegations against Chavez were reported by the New York Times in March 2026, library and city officials transitioned to calling the branch Fruitvale while initiating the process for an official name change.
- Golden Gate (1899, current location 1949), 5606 San Pablo Avenue

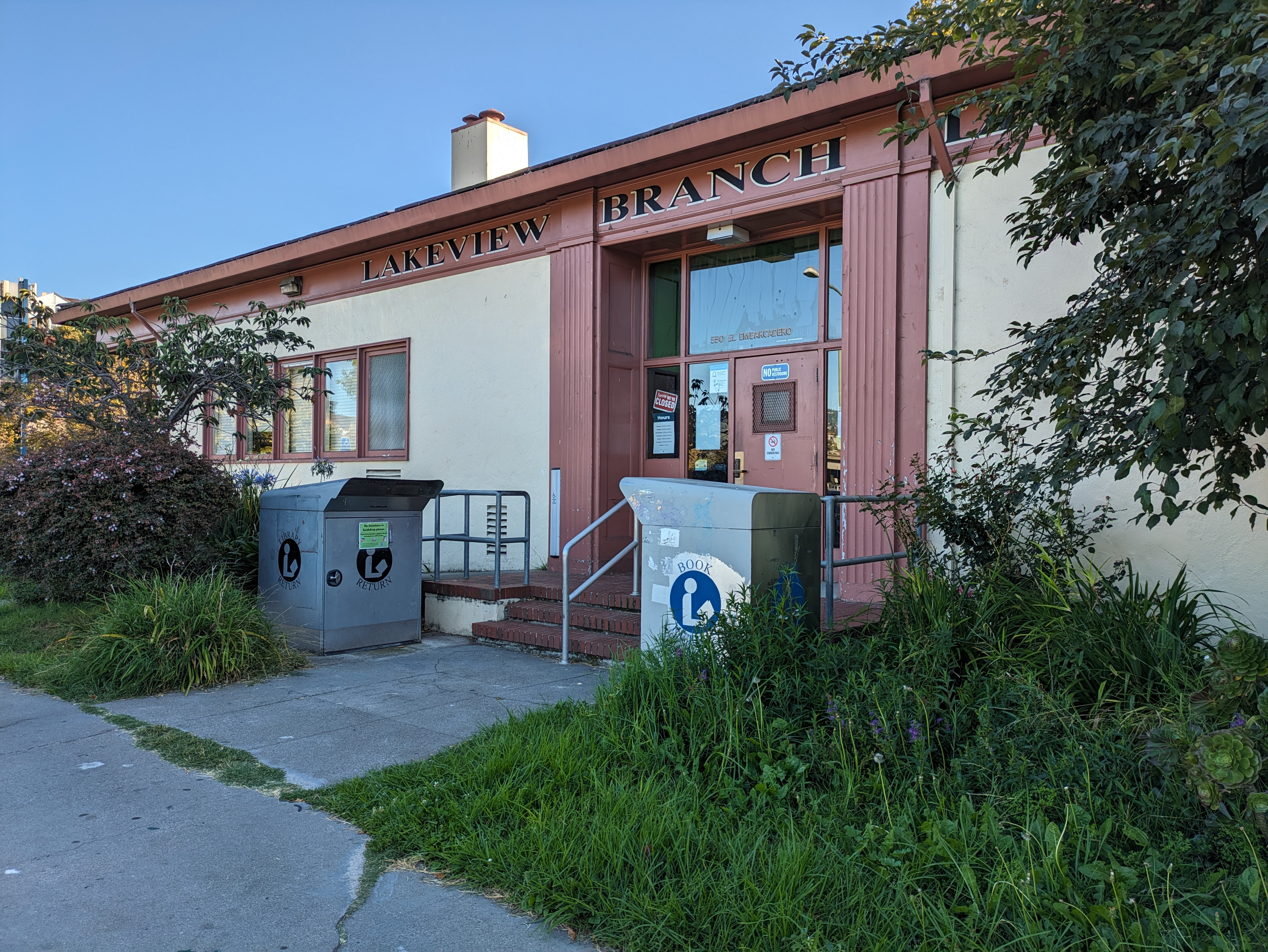
Lakeview Branch

- Lakeview (1930, current location 1949), 550 El Embarcadero
- Martin Luther King Jr. (1970), 6833 International Boulevard
  - This branch, now named after civil rights activist Martin Luther King Jr., was originally established in 1916; it was named the Lockwood Branch in 1929. In 1970, it was replaced by a new facility, which is the present library. It features a black history collection, containing books written by or about people of African descent.
- Melrose (1911, current location 1916), 4805 Foothill Boulevard
  - One of four Carnegie Library Branches in Oakland that were built between 1916-1918, thanks to the Carnegie grant of $140,000. Because of the early donation of the land, Melrose Branch was able to begin its construction before the war, and with $35,000 (¼ of the grant) of the funding the Carnegie architect William H. Weeks was able to add more resources to use more materials such as including a marble lined foyer, compared to the construction of the other 3 sites. The Classical Revival style was designed by William H. Weeks, and C. Christensen. The Classical Revival building is in the form of two rectangles set at angles with a generous rotunda between.
  - This Branch is a historic Landmark. The ordinance date is November 4, 1980.
- Montclair (1930), 1687 Mountain Boulevard

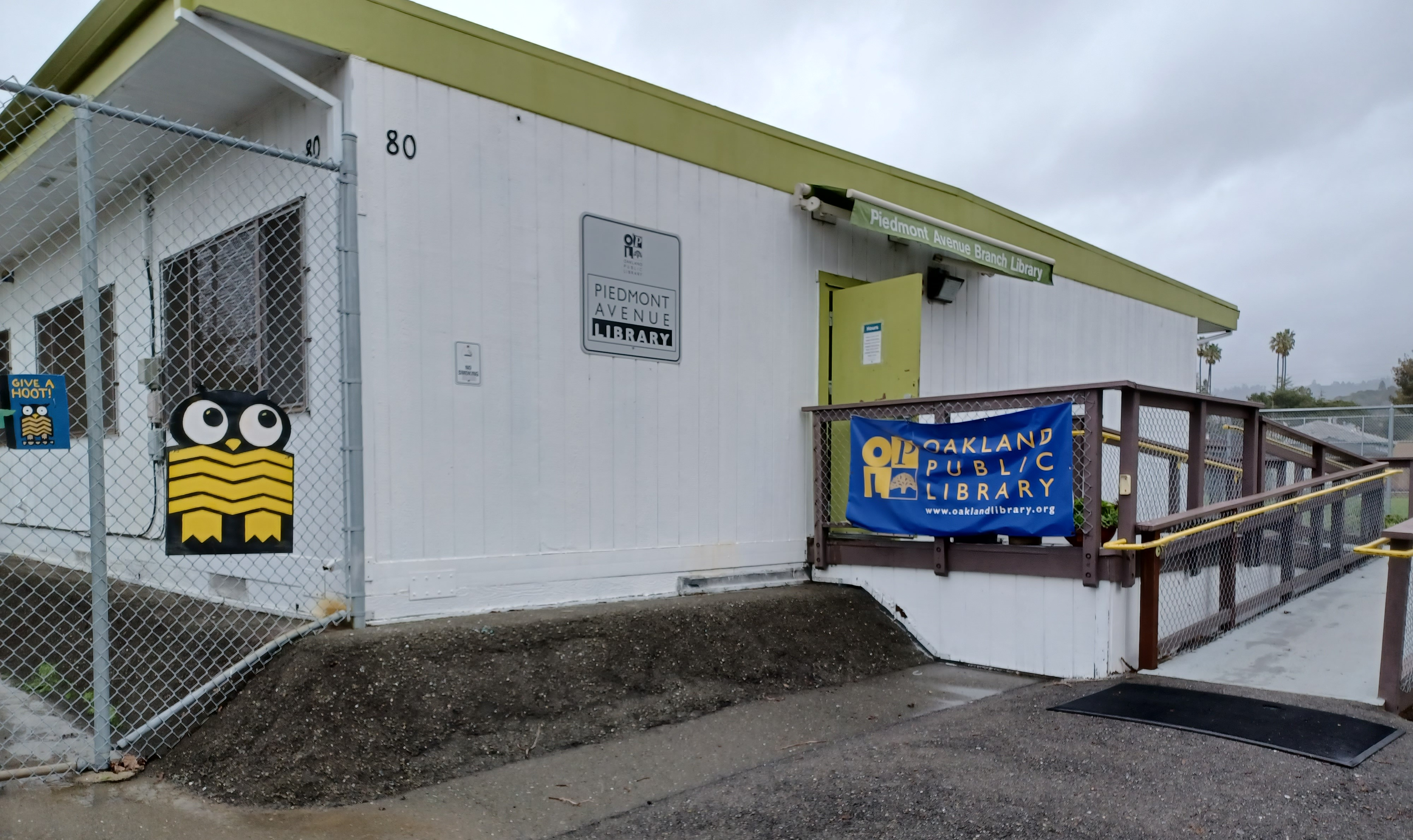
Piedmont Avenue branch

- Piedmont Avenue (1912, current location 2012), 80 Echo Avenue
  - This branch had been on 41st Street at Piedmont Avenue since 1932, but had to move when the building owner raised the rent. The library is now on the grounds of Piedmont Avenue Elementary School.
- Rockridge (1919, current location 1996), 5366 College Avenue

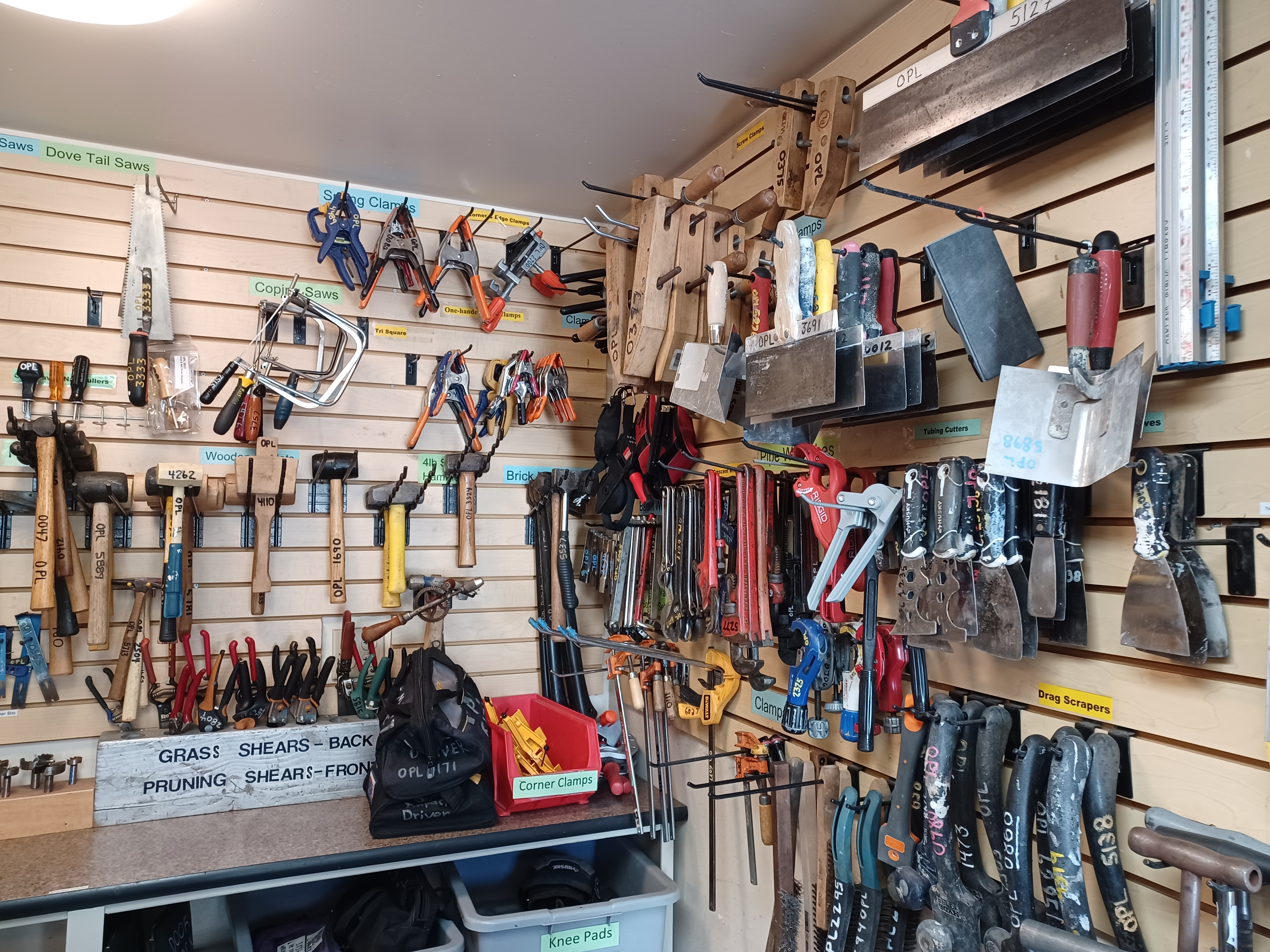
Tools at the Oakland Tool Lending Library

- Temescal (1899, current location 1918), 5205 Telegraph Avenue
  - The Temescal branch houses the Oakland Tool Lending Library, one of the few tool libraries in the Bay Area, which allows library patrons to check out tools for various kinds of repairs and home-improvement projects, as well as books, videos, and other instructional materials.
- West Oakland (1977), 1801 Adeline Street

== African American Museum and Library at Oakland (AAMLO) ==
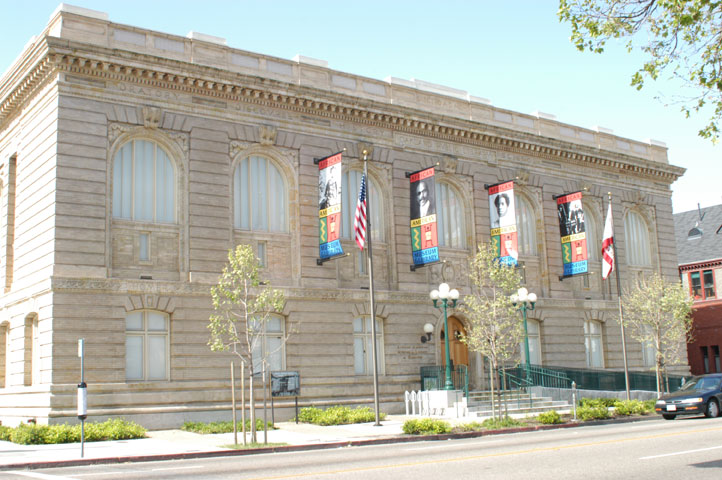
The African American Museum & Library at Oakland.

The African American Museum & Library at Oakland (AAMLO) is a non-circulating library that archives historic collections and reference materials documenting the African American experience in California. Among the more than 160 collections in the library are archives relating to Martin Luther King Jr., Malcolm X, the Black Panthers, Africa, and genealogy. Materials include photographs, manuscripts, letters, diaries, newspapers, recorded oral histories, videos, and microfilms. AAMLO’s two galleries host changing exhibitions of art, history, and culture.
