= John Yule (California politician) =

American politician

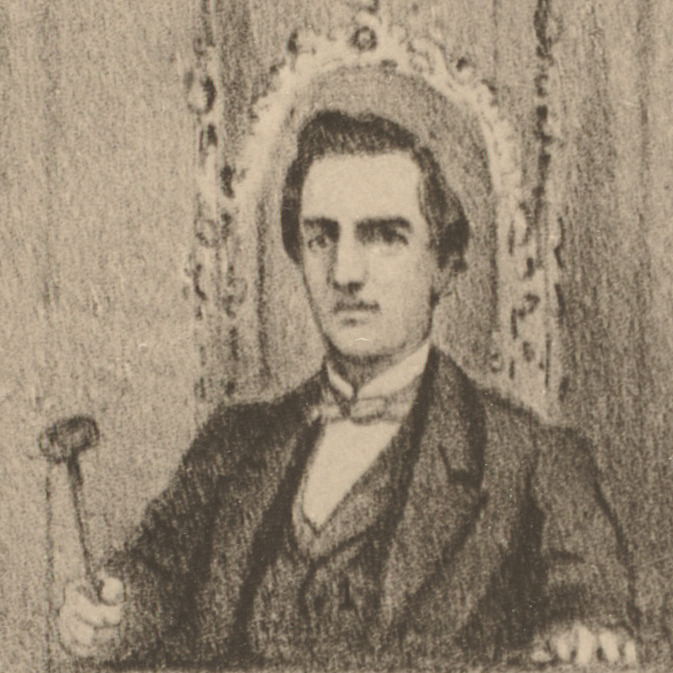
- Sketch by Edward Jump, 1865

16th Speaker of the California State Assembly
- In office December 1865–April 1866
- Preceded by: William H. Sears
- Succeeded by: Caius T. Ryland

Member of the California State Assembly
- In office January 5, 1885 – January 3, 1887
- Constituency: 4th district
- In office December 4, 1865 – April 2, 1866
- Constituency: 20th district
- In office January 7, 1861 – May 15, 1862
- Constituency: 20th district

Member of the California State Senate from the 20th district
- In office December 7, 1863 – April 4, 1864

Personal details
- Born: John Yule; May 16, 1833 Grange, Scotland, United Kingdom
- Party: Republican; National Union
- Spouse: Elizabeth McDowell (m. 1859)
- Disappeared: March 28, 1888 (age 54) near El Dorado, California U.S.
- Status: Presumed murdered

John Yule (May 16, 1833 – disappeared March 28, 1888) was a Scottish-born American politician who served in the California State Legislature as a Republican. Between 1865 and 1866, Yule served as Speaker of the Assembly. He was also affiliated with the National Union Party during the Civil War.

On April 4, 1888 a dead body, which was thought to be Yule's, was found near Mud Springs, California (now known as El Dorado). The body was stripped naked and had a bullet hole in its forehead. Local newspapers later reported that they had determined that the body did not belong to Yule. Yule's fate is still unknown.

Yule Marble, which was used to construct the Lincoln Memorial and the Tomb of the Unknown Soldier, is named after John's brother George, a Colorado prospector.

Preceded by William H. Sears	Speaker of the California State Assembly; December 1865–April 1866	Succeeded by Caius T. Ryland
