= George H. Rogers =

American politician

Member of the California State Senate
- In office 1875–1879
- Constituency: 8th district
- In office 1857–1861
- Constituency: 7th district

18th Speaker of the California State Assembly
- In office December 1869–April 1870
- Preceded by: Caius T. Ryland
- Succeeded by: Thomas Bowles Shannon

Member of the California State Assembly
- In office 1869–1874
- Constituency: 8th district
- In office 1856–1857
- Constituency: 7th district

Personal details
- Born: George Holt Rogers; December 5, 1825 New London, Connecticut, U.S.
- Died: December 21, 1915 (aged 90) Napa, California
- Party: Democratic

George Holt Rogers (December 5, 1825 – December 21, 1915) was an American Democratic politician who served in the California State Assembly and California State Senate. He served as the 18th Speaker of the Assembly between 1869 and 1870, being the first speaker to serve in the current state capitol after its opening.

While serving in the state Senate, Rogers wrote and introduced the Rogers Free Library Act which allowed cities to create taxpayer-funded public libraries free at the point of service.

Rogers was born in New London, Connecticut. He moved to San Francisco in 1849 during the California Gold Rush. In 1895, he moved to Napa, California, where he died in 1915, aged 90.

Political offices
Preceded by Caius T. Ryland	Speaker of the California State Assembly; December 1869–April 1870	Succeeded by Thomas Bowles Shannon
