= William H. Sears =

American politician

Collector of the Port of San Francisco
- In office May 1, 1884 – September 15, 1885
- Appointed by: Chester A. Arthur
- Preceded by: Eugene L. Sullivan
- Succeeded by: John S. Hager

Member of the California State Senate from the 15th district
- In office 1879–1883

15th Speaker of the California State Assembly
- In office December 1863 – April 1864
- Preceded by: Tim N. Machin
- Succeeded by: John Yule

Member of the California State Assembly from the 21st district
- In office 1861–1865

Personal details
- Born: William Henry Sears; September 1, 1830 Portland, Connecticut, U.S.
- Died: February 27, 1891 (age 60) San Francisco, California, U.S.
- Party: Republican; National Union
- Spouse: Lephe Wood Young
- Children: 1

William Henry Sears (September 1, 1830 – February 7, 1891) was a Republican politician from California who served in the California State Assembly from the 21st district between 1861 and 1865, serving as Speaker of the Assembly between 1863 and 1864. He later served in the California State Senate between 1879 and 1881 from the 15th district where he was a candidate for President pro-tempore of the Senate but lost. After his term ended he was appointed collector of customs of the Port of San Francisco by President Chester A. Arthur, serving from 1884 to 1885. He died in San Francisco in 1891 at the age of 60 and was buried in Mountain View Cemetery in Oakland.

| Preceded by Tim N. Machin | Speaker of the California State Assembly; December 1863–April 1864 | Succeeded by John Yule |
