= Caius T. Ryland =

American politician

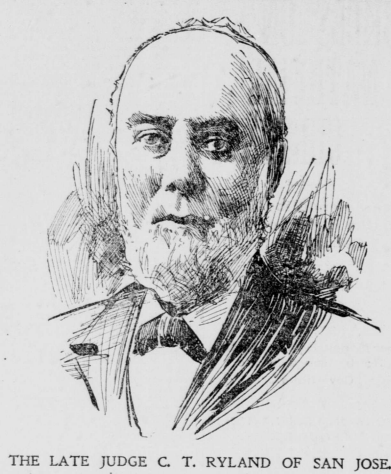

17th Speaker of the California State Assembly
- In office December 1867–March 1868
- Preceded by: John Yule
- Succeeded by: George H. Rogers

Member of the California State Assembly
- In office 1867–1869
- Constituency: 7th district
- In office 1855–1857
- Constituency: 4th district

Personal details
- Born: Caius Tacitus Ryland; June 30, 1826 Howard County, Missouri, U.S.
- Died: December 5, 1897 (age 71) San Jose, California, U.S.
- Party: Democratic
- Spouse: Martha Letitia Burnett
- Children: 11
- Parent: John Ferguson Ryland (father)
- Relatives: Peter Hardeman Burnett (father-in-law)

Caius Tacitus Ryland (June 30, 1826 — December 5, 1897) was an American politician in California. He was a Democrat who served in the California State Assembly from the 4th and later from the 7th district. He was Speaker of the Assembly between 1867 and 1868.

== Life ==
=== Early life and career ===
Ryland was born in Howard County, Missouri in 1826, the son of John Ferguson Ryland, a future justice on the Missouri Supreme Court, and was one of 18 children. In his youth, he attended school in Lexington, worked on a farm, and studied law, eventually being accepted to the Missouri bar. Ryland was drawn to California in 1849, during the Gold Rush, and was appointed clerk of the Court of First Instance in San Francisco by Military Governor Bennet C. Riley shortly after his arrival. Upon the election of Peter Hardeman Burnett as the first Governor of California, Ryland became his private secretary and then practiced law in San Jose after the governor's resignation. Ryland would later marry Burnett's daughter, Martha, thus making Burnett his father-in-law. Ryland promoted the construction of a wagon trail across the Sierra Madre mountains and the first railroad to be built in the state from San Francisco to San Jose, and was a director and attorney for that railroad until it was sold to the Central Pacific Railroad.

=== California State Assembly ===
Ryland was elected to the California State Assembly from the 4th district in 1855, and chaired the Committee on Internal Improvements where he reported a bill on building a wagon road across the Sierra Nevada Mountains. He left office in 1857 and was then re-elected in 1867 from the 7th district, also serving as Speaker of the Assembly until 1868. He left the Assembly in 1869.

=== Later career ===
In 1876, Ryland was chairman of the State Democratic Convention and unsuccessfully ran for U.S. Senate. He practiced law in San Jose until his death in 1897.

Preceded by John Yule	Speaker of the California State Assembly; December 1867–March 1868	Succeeded by George H. Rogers
