= Geneve L. A. Shaffer =

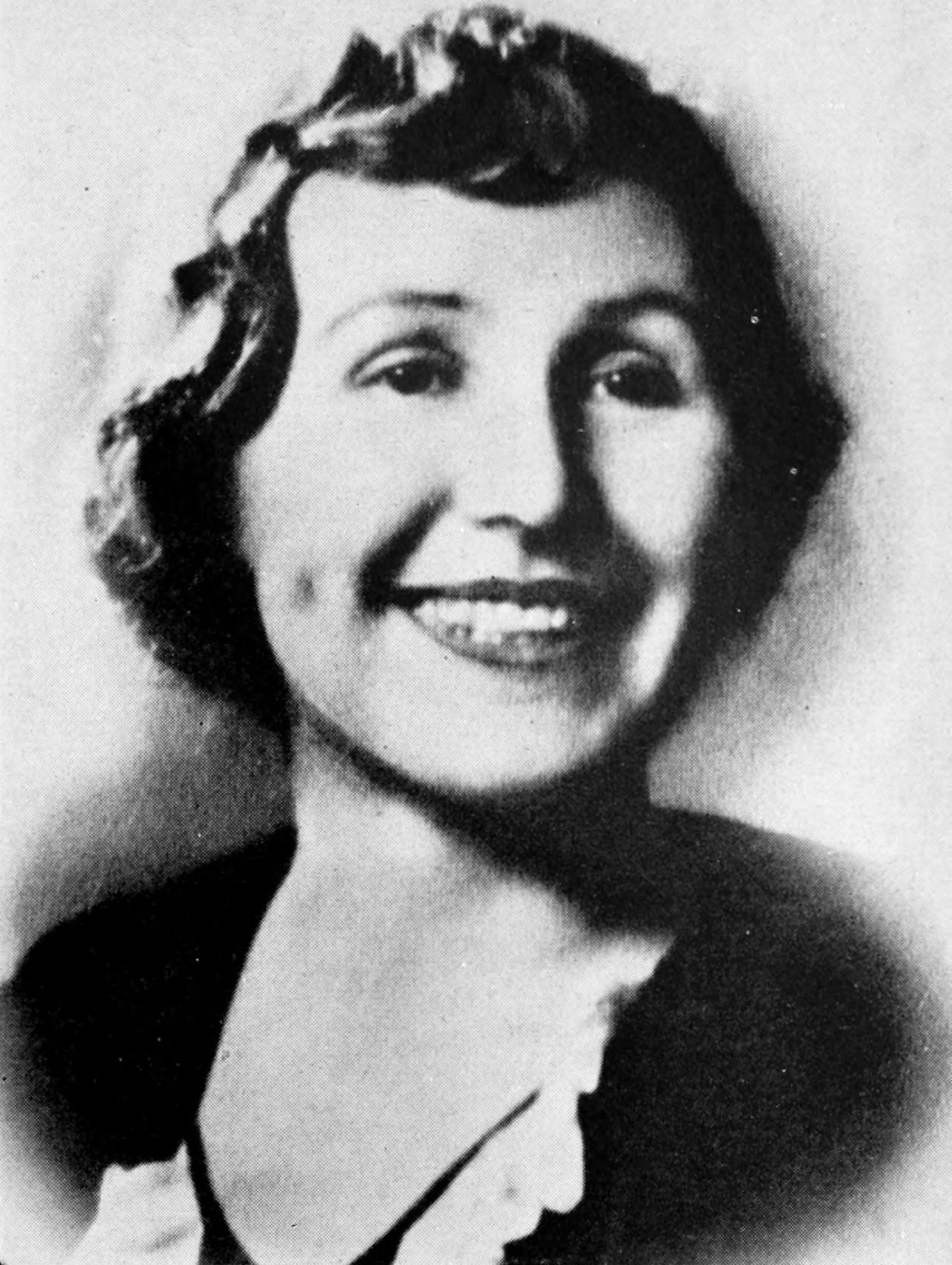
- Shaffer c. 1940
- Born: July 20, 1888; Wisconsin
- Died: December 13, 1976 (aged 88); San Francisco, California
- Education: San Francisco Polytechnic High School
- Known for: "the first woman in the world to sail in a flying machine"
- Spouse: John C. Parsons

Geneve Lucy Angela Shaffer (July 20, 1888 – December 13, 1976) was an American realtor, lecturer and writer. In 1909 she was touted by the San Francisco Call as "the first woman in the world to sail in a flying machine".

== Early life and family ==
Geneve Lucy Angela Shaffer was born on July 20, 1888, in Wisconsin. Her father was William Chase Shaffer, an associate of Thomas Edison and Alexander Graham Bell, and inventor of the sprinkler system, the automatic burglar alarm and the chemical fire extinguisher.

Shaffer attended the San Francisco Polytechnic High School and was a member of the Phi Alpha Kappa sorority and she then attended a finishing school at Jamestown, New York.

== Career ==
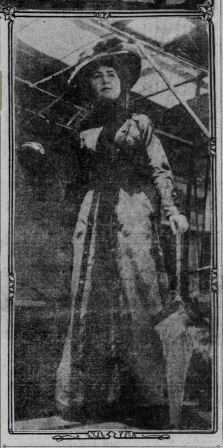
Geneve Shaffer, San Francisco Call, 1909

At the beginning of the 1900s, Geneve Shaffer was living with her mother and brother at 302 Holyoke Street, San Francisco. Her brother was Cleve T. Shaffer (1885–1964), with whom she built a flying machine. In 1911, Cleve T. Shaffer was the leading aviation figure of his country. He was one of the first five members of The Planetary Society, founder of the National Tank Defense League and honorary President of the San Francisco Soaring Society. He was the owner of "Tai Shan", a country estate near Los Gatos, California.

"I might not have flown it if Cleve and I hadn't built it. My flight was short and no great shakes. Don't tell Cleve, but piloting a free balloon is a lot more fun."

— Geneve Shaffer

On August 22, 1909, Geneve Shaffer flew Cleve's airplane in the San Bruno hills near San Francisco. For this ascension, the Smithsonian Institution regards Shaffer as the first woman glider pilot in the United States. During one of her ascensions she made the first aerial photographs of Oakland and San Francisco. She also worked with Cleve in his Shaffer Aero Manufacturing Co., serving as secretary and chief rigger. In autumn 1909, Geneve was co-pilot of balloonist Ivy Baldwin of the balloon "The Pride of San Francisco", but the balloon crashed down in the water. After that Geneve gave up aviation.

Shaffer traveled all over the world and was a Hearst correspondent in the Orient.

Shaffer lectured in India, Australia, in the northern part of Africa and in many European countries.

"I thought all the women who did not want to be actresses wanted to be real estate operators, but after my experience in journalism I found out that there were just as many who wanted to be journalists, so it is merely woman's demand for self expression. Whether she is carrying out this thought quietly by creating a home and being a mother, or by building up a business and mothering her ideas to fruition, the quality of self expression is paramount. It is a part of her very being and she cannot help but be successful — it is born in her."

— Geneve Shaffer

As a realtor, she specialized in skyscrapers. In 1934, Mary Margaret McBride, NEA Service Staff Correspondent, called her "record-breaking California's outstanding woman realtor" in occasion of Shaffer visit to the East for a 10 million dollar construction deal. She was said to be the only woman skyscraper builder in the country, and followed all the process, from the buying of the land to the renting of the spaces. She was responsible for several of San Francisco's taller buildings. For this reason she was known as the "Skyscraper Girl".

Shaffer was a member of: American Woman's Club (London), San Francisco Women's Athletic Club, California Writers Club, Speech Arts Club, American Pen Women, San Francisco Soroptimist Club.

Shaffer is the author of The Log of the Empire State.

In 1939, Shaffer was appointed to serve as a member of the State Real Estate Advisory Board, which cooperated with the state Department of Real Estate (DRE) in regulating the industry.

In 1969 Shaffer wrote her autobiography, Geneve, published by Vantage Press.

== Personal life ==
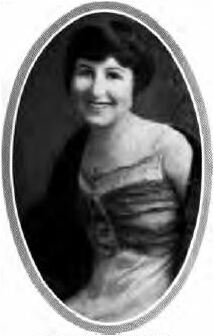
Geneve Shaffer, 1922

Shaffer lived at 560 Sutter St., San Francisco, California. On December 17, 1961, she married John C. Parsons, 22 years older than her.

Geneve Shaffer Parsons died aged 88 on December 13, 1976.
