= Josephine Clifford McCracken =

California writer and environmentalist

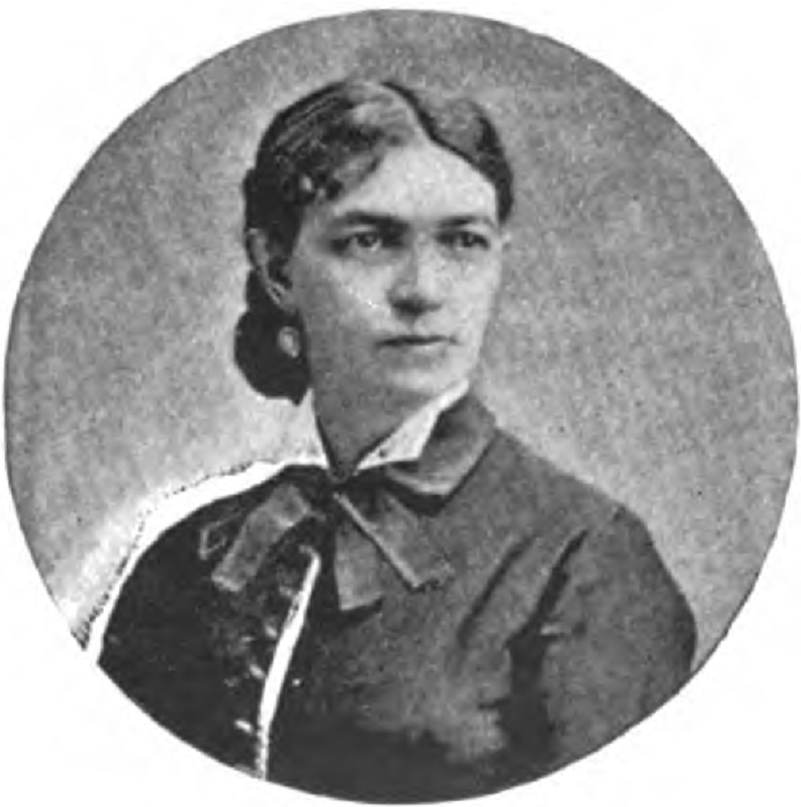
Josephine Clifford McCracken

Josephine Clifford McCracken (or McCrackin) (1839–1921) was a California writer and journalist (a contemporary of Bret Harte, John Muir, Ina Coolbrith, and Joaquin Miller), as well as an environmentalist. She was a member of the Pacific Coast Women's Press Association.

== Early life ==
Josephine Woempner was born in Petershagen, Kingdom of Prussia, during a time of much civil unrest. Her father, a former soldier at Waterloo, foresaw trouble from citizenry calling for revolution, and so gathered his family in 1846 and emigrated to St. Louis, Missouri, in the United States.

In 1864, Josephine met and married Army Lieutenant James A. Clifford in New Mexico. Clifford's sanity began to unravel and he confessed to his wife that he had killed a man in Texas. He threatened her, saying that if she told anyone, he would kill her too. After appealing to his superiors and making sure he was under guard, she fled to her family in San Francisco.

== In California ==
McCracken wrote articles for Harper Brothers and for the newspapers Out West and Western Field while traveling through New Mexico and lower California, and once in San Francisco, turned full-time to her love for writing and literary pursuits. She joined the staff of the Overland Monthly as secretary in 1867. She befriended poet Ina Coolbrith, who she called one of the Golden Gate Trinity along with the other two pillars of the Overland Monthly, Bret Harte and Charles Warren Stoddard. Coolbrith called her "Jo". Her first piece for the journal, "Down Among the Dead Leaves", was published in 1869. In 1871 a collection of her short stories was published as a book entitled Overland Tales. She eventually became a respected figure in the San Francisco literary community. In 1880, she bought 26 acres (110,000 m^{2}) of land in the Santa Cruz Mountains and built a home in the community of Summit, California.

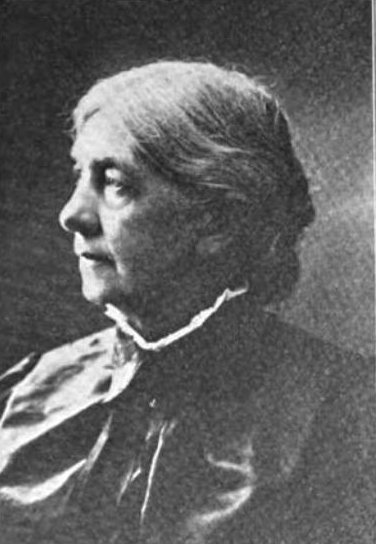
Josephine Clifford McCracken in the 1910s

In 1882 in Salinas, California, she met and married Jackson McCracken, a former Arizona congressman. The couple settled into Josephine's house, then a literary gathering place. However, in 1899 a large forest fire destroyed both the house and the surrounding redwood trees.

The disaster prompted Josephine's turn to environmentalism to save the redwoods. In 1900, Andrew P. Hill was commissioned to photograph the area after the fire. As McCracken was both a friend and a member of the Pacific Coast Press Association, Hill wrote a letter of concern to Josephine, which she published in the Santa Cruz Sentinel along with an article urging people to rally around the cause. She continued to work with Hill, joining him in founding the Sempervirens Club, and together they succeeded in having legislation passed to protect the redwoods in Big Basin Redwoods State Park.

On June 29, 1915, McCracken traveled from Santa Cruz, where she had moved after the fire, to attend Ina Coolbrith Day at the Panama–Pacific International Exposition in San Francisco. She watched from the overflowing audience as Coolbrith was named the first California Poet Laureate. After several more speeches were made in her honor, and bouquets brought in abundance to the podium, Coolbrith addressed the crowd: "There is one woman here with whom I want to share these honors: Josephine Clifford McCracken. For we are linked together, the last two living members of Bret Harte's staff of Overland writers." McCracken was then ushered up from her seat in the audience to join Coolbrith on stage.

In 1919, at the age of 80, McCracken wrote to Coolbrith to complain to her dear friend of still having to work for a living: "The world has not used us well, Ina; California has been ungrateful to us. Of all the hundred thousands the state pays out in pensions of one kind and another, don't you think you should be at the head of the pensioners, and I somewhere down below?"

== Work ==
- Overland Tales (1877)
- The Woman Who Lost Him (1913)
