= Ina Coolbrith =

American, first poet laureate of California, writer, and librarian (1841–1928)

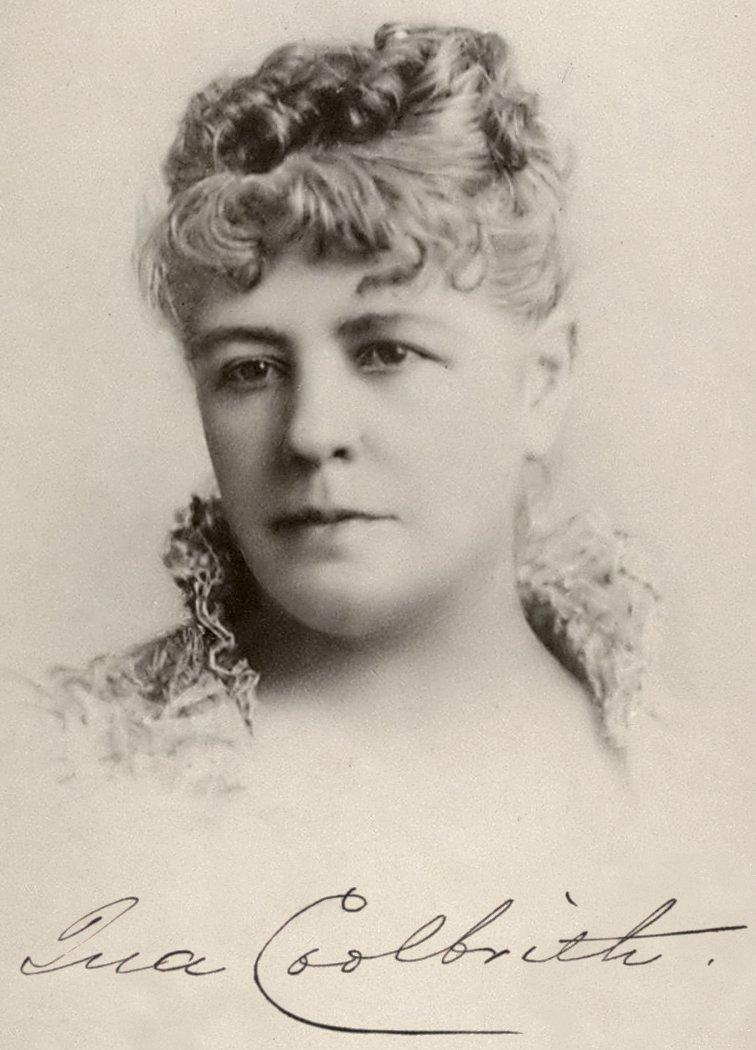
Ina Coolbrith in the 1880s

Ina Donna Coolbrith (born Josephine Donna Smith; March 10, 1841 – February 29, 1928) was an American poet, writer, librarian, and a prominent figure in the San Francisco Bay Area literary community. Called the "Sweet Singer of California", she was the first California Poet Laureate and the first poet laureate of any American state.

Coolbrith, born the niece of the Church of Jesus Christ of Latter-day Saints founder Joseph Smith, left the Mormon community as a child to enter her teens in Los Angeles, California, where she began to publish poetry. She terminated a youthful failed marriage to make her home in San Francisco, and met writers Bret Harte and Charles Warren Stoddard with whom she formed the "Golden Gate Trinity" closely associated with the literary journal Overland Monthly. Her poetry received positive notice from critics and established poets such as Mark Twain, Ambrose Bierce, and Alfred, Lord Tennyson. She held literary salons at her home in Russian Hill—in this way she introduced new writers to publishers. Coolbrith befriended the poet Joaquin Miller and helped him gain global fame.

While Miller toured Europe and lived out their mutual dream of visiting Lord Byron's tomb, Coolbrith cared for his Wintu daughter and members of her own family. As a result, she came to reside in Oakland and accepted the position of city librarian. Her poetry suffered as a result of her long work hours, but she mentored a generation of young readers including Jack London and Isadora Duncan. After she served for 19 years, Oakland's library patrons called for reorganization, and Coolbrith was fired. She moved back to San Francisco and was invited by members of the Bohemian Club to be their librarian.

Coolbrith began to write a history of California literature, including much autobiographical material, but the fire following the 1906 San Francisco earthquake consumed her work. Author Gertrude Atherton and Coolbrith's Bohemian Club friends helped set her up again in a new house, and she resumed writing and holding literary salons. She traveled by train to New York City several times and, with fewer worldly cares, greatly increased her poetry output.

On June 30, 1915, Coolbrith was named California's poet laureate, and she continued to write poetry for eight more years. Her style was more than the usual melancholic or uplifting themes expected of women—she included a wide variety of subjects in her poems, which were noted as being "singularly sympathetic" and "palpably spontaneous". Her sensuous descriptions of natural scenes advanced the art of Victorian poetry to incorporate greater accuracy without trite sentiment, foreshadowing the Imagist school and the work of Robert Frost. California poet laureate Carol Muske-Dukes wrote of Coolbrith's poems that, though they "were steeped in a high tea lavender style", influenced by a British stateliness, "California remained her inspiration."

== Early life ==
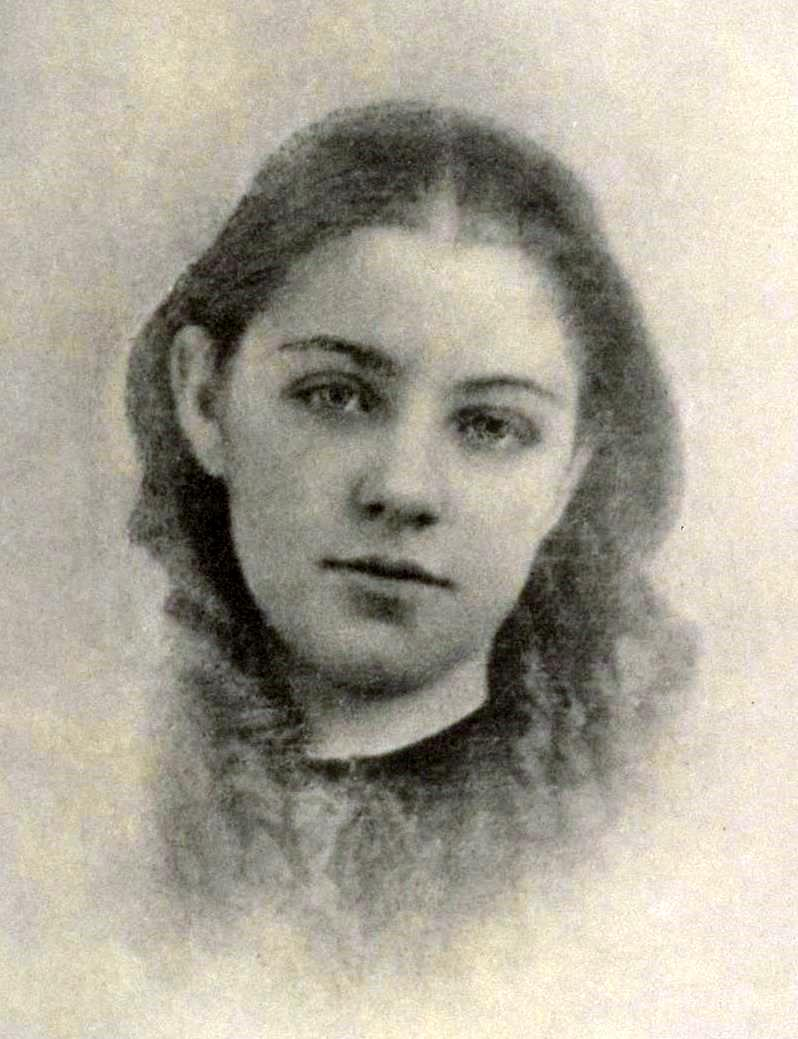
Coolbrith in her youth

Ina Coolbrith was born Josephine Donna Smith in Nauvoo, Illinois, the last of three daughters of Agnes Moulton Coolbrith and Don Carlos Smith, brother to Joseph Smith, the founder of Mormonism. Coolbrith's father died of malarial fever four months after her birth, and a sister died one month after that; Coolbrith's mother then married Joseph Smith, in 1842, becoming his sixth or seventh wife. No children came of the union—Agnes felt neglected in her unfruitful Levirate marriage, the only such marriage of Smith. In June 1844, Smith was killed at the hands of an anti-Mormon mob.

Losing her faith and fearful of her life, Coolbrith's mother left the Latter-day Saint community and moved to Saint Louis, Missouri, where she married a printer and lawyer named William Pickett. Twin sons were born to the couple, and in 1851 Pickett traveled overland with his new family to California in a wagon train. On the long trek, the young Ina read from a book of Shakespeare's works and from a collection of Byron's poems. As a ten-year-old girl, Ina entered California in front of the wagon train with the famous African-American scout James Beckwourth, riding with him on his horse, through what would later be named Beckwourth Pass. The family settled in Los Angeles, California, and Pickett established a law practice.

To avoid identification with her former family or with Mormonism, Ina's mother reverted to using her maiden name, Coolbrith. The family resolved not to speak of their Mormon past, and it was only after Ina Coolbrith's death that the general public learned of her origin. Coolbrith did keep in touch with her Smith relations, however, including a lifelong correspondence with her first cousin Joseph F. Smith to whom and for whom she frequently expressed her love and regard.

Coolbrith, sometimes called "Inez" by her family, or just "Ina", pronounced EYE-nuh, wrote poems beginning at age 11, first publishing "My Ideal Home" in a newspaper in 1856, writing as Ina Donna Coolbrith. Her work appeared in the Poetry Corner of the Los Angeles Star, and in the California Home Journal. As she grew into young womanhood, Coolbrith was renowned for her beauty; she was selected to open a ball with Pío Pico, the last Mexican governor of California.

In April 1858, at the age of 17, Coolbrith married Robert Bruce Carsley, an iron worker and part-time actor. However, she experienced abuse at his hands, and suffered further emotional pain from the death of the couple's infant son. An altercation between Pickett and Carsley resulted in a bullet mutilating Carsley's hand, requiring amputation. Carsley accused Coolbrith of infidelity, and she divorced him in a sensational public trial; the dissolution was finalized on December 30, 1861. Her later poem, "The Mother's Grief", was a eulogy to her lost son, but she never publicly explained its meaning; it was only upon Coolbrith's death that her literary friends discovered that she had ever been a mother.

In 1862, Coolbrith moved with her mother, stepfather and twin half-brothers to San Francisco to ward off depression. She also changed her name from Josephine Donna Carsley to Ina Coolbrith. In San Francisco she found employment as an English teacher.

== Poet ==
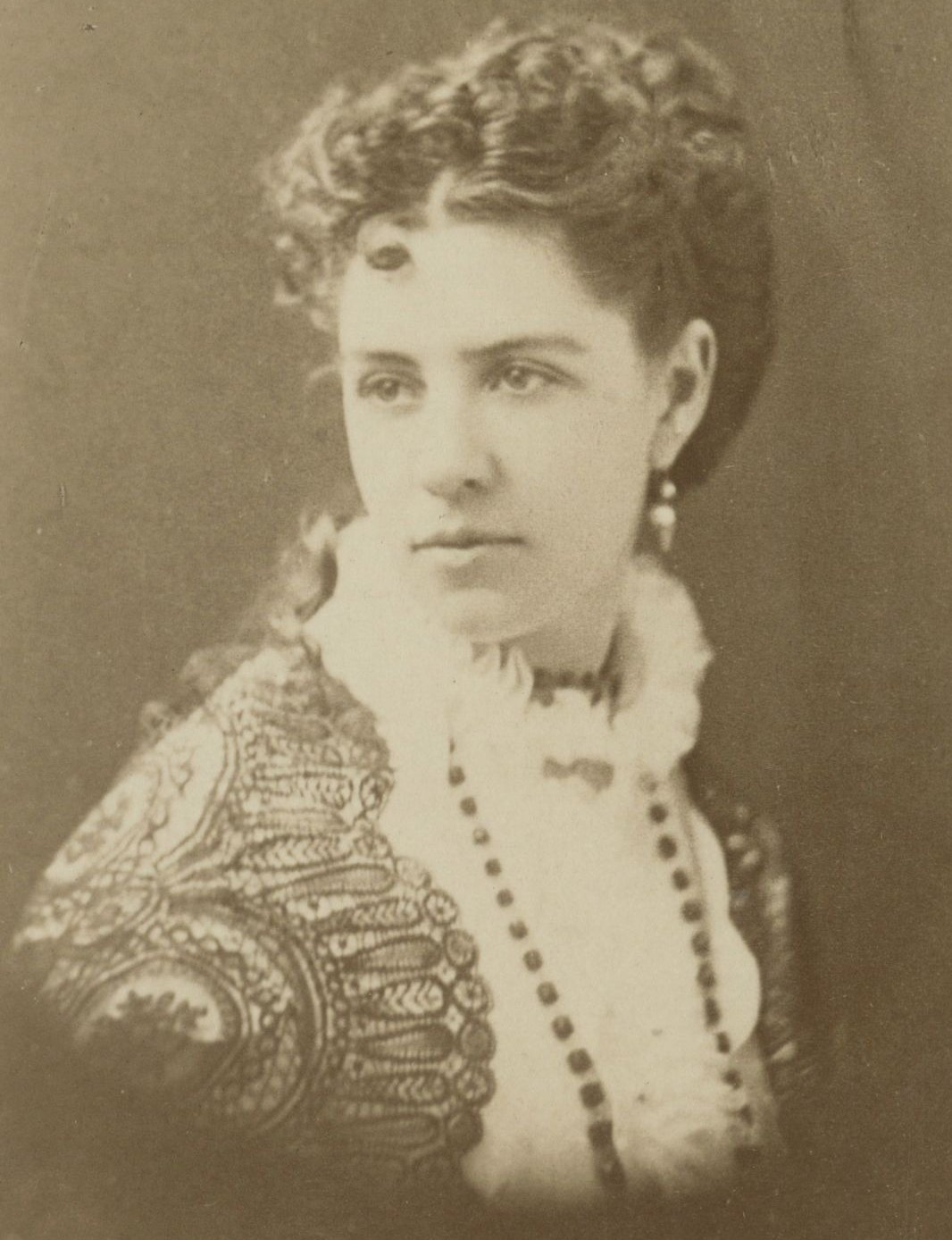
Coolbrith in San Francisco at the age of 29 or 30

Coolbrith soon met Bret Harte and Samuel Langhorne Clemens, writing as Mark Twain, in San Francisco. She published poems in The Californian, a new literary newspaper formed in 1864 and edited by Harte and Charles Henry Webb. In 1867, four of Coolbrith's poems appeared in The Galaxy. In July 1868, Coolbrith supplied a poem, "Longing", for the first issue of the Overland Monthly, and served unofficially as co-editor with Harte in selecting poems, articles and stories for the periodical. She became a friend of actress and poet Adah Menken, adding to Menken's credibility as an intellectual, but was unable to impress Harte of Menken's worth. Coolbrith also worked as a schoolteacher for extra income.

For a decade, Coolbrith supplied one poem for each new issue of the Overland Monthly. After the 1866 publication of four of her poems in an anthology edited by Harte, Coolbrith's "The Mother's Grief" was positively reviewed in The New York Times. Another poem, "When the Grass Shall Cover Me", appeared unattributed in an anthology of John Greenleaf Whittier's favorite works by other poets, entitled Songs of Three Centuries (1875); Coolbrith's poem was judged the best of that group. In 1867, recently widowed Josephine Clifford arrived at the Overland Monthly to take a position as secretary. She formed a lifetime friendship with Coolbrith.

Coolbrith's literary work connected her with poet Alfred, Lord Tennyson and naturalist John Muir, as well as Charles Warren Stoddard who also helped Harte edit the Overland Monthly. As editors and arbiters of literary taste, Harte, Stoddard and Coolbrith were known as the "Golden Gate Trinity". Stoddard once said that Coolbrith never had any of her literary submissions returned from a publisher. Coolbrith met writer and critic Ambrose Bierce in 1869, and by 1871 when he was courting Mary Ellen Day, Bierce organized friendly card games between himself, Day, Coolbrith and Stoddard. Bierce felt that Coolbrith's best poems were "California", the commencement ode she wrote for the University of California in 1871, and "Beside the Dead", written in 1875.

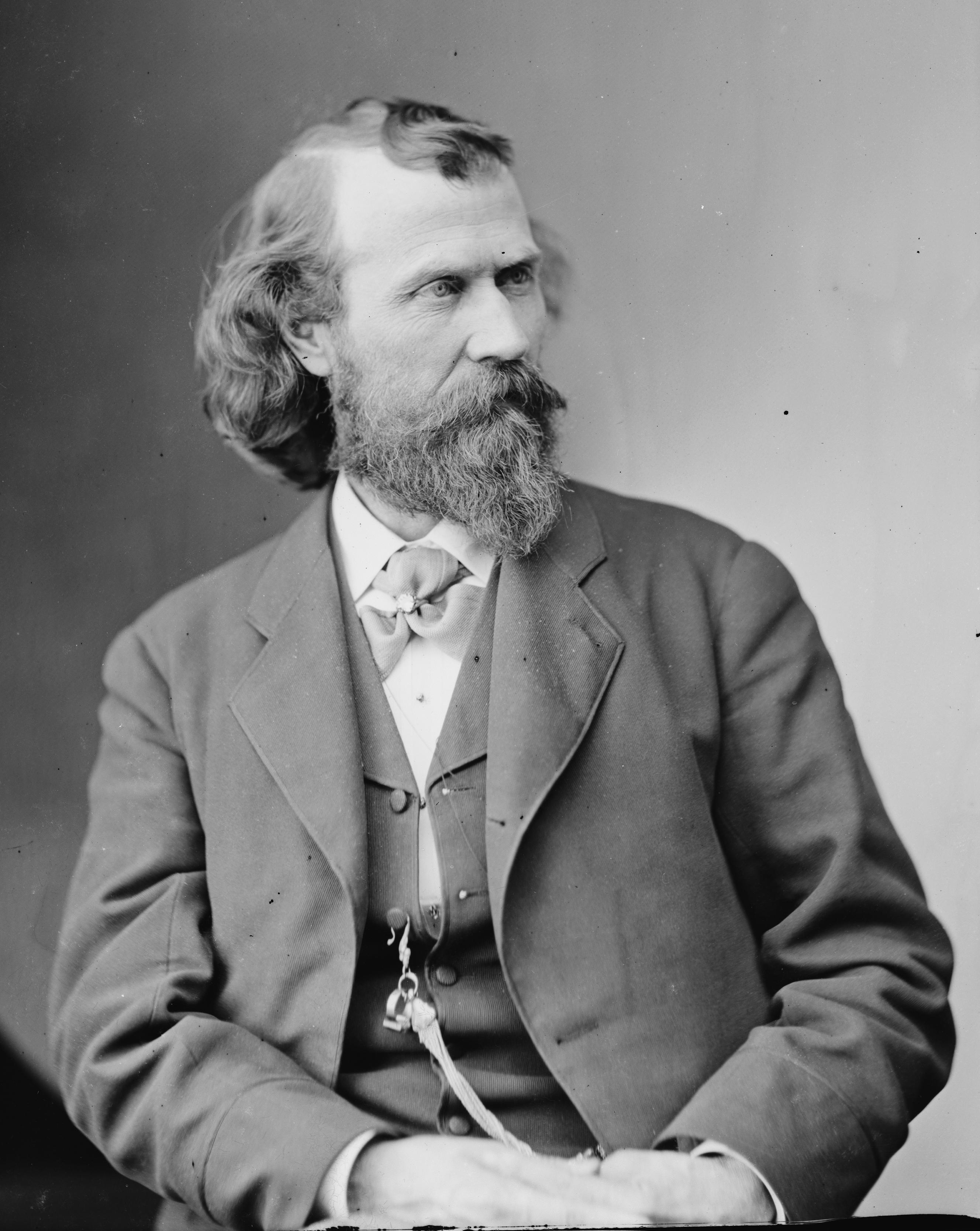
Joaquin Miller in the 1870s

In mid-1870, Coolbrith met the eccentric poet Cincinnatus Hiner Miller, newly divorced from his second wife, and introduced him to the San Francisco literary circle at the suggestion of Stoddard. Miller quoted Tennyson in describing Coolbrith as "divinely tall, and most divinely fair". When Coolbrith discovered that Miller was enamored of the heroic, tragic life of the legendary Californio outlaw Joaquin Murrieta, she suggested that Miller take the name Joaquin Miller as his pen name, and also that he dress the part with longer hair and a more recognizably mountain man-style costume.

Coolbrith then helped Miller prepare for his upcoming trip to England, where he would lay a laurel wreath on the tomb of Lord Byron, a poet they both greatly admired. The two gathered California Bay Laurel branches in Sausalito and took portrait photographs together. Coolbrith wrote "With a Wreath of Laurel" about this enterprise. Miller went to New York by train, calling himself "Joaquin Miller" for the first time, and was in London by August 1870. When he placed the wreath at the Church of St. Mary Magdalene, Hucknall, it caused a stir among the English clergy who did not see any connection between California poets and the late lord. They sent to George I, the King of Greece for another laurel wreath from that country of Byron's heroic death, accompanied by some Greek funding which was joined in kind from the purse of the Bishop of Norwich to rebuild and refurbish the 500-year-old church. The two wreaths were hung side by side over Byron's tomb. After this, Miller was nicknamed "The Byron of the West."

== Librarian ==
Coolbrith had hoped to tour the East Coast and Europe with Miller, but stayed behind in San Francisco because she felt obliged to care for her mother and her seriously ill, widowed sister Agnes who was unable to care for herself or for her two children. In late 1871 she took on the care of another dependent when Joaquin Miller brought her a teenaged Indian girl (widely rumored to be his own daughter) to care for while he went abroad again, this time to Brazil and Europe.

Beside the Dead

It must be sweet, O thou, my dead, to lie
With hands that folded are from every task;
Sealed with the seal of the great mystery,
The lips that nothing answer, nothing ask.
The life-long struggle ended; ended quite
The weariness of patience, and of pain,
And the eyes closed to open not again
On desolate dawn or dreariness of night.
It must be sweet to slumber and forget;
To have the poor tired heart so still at last;
Done with all yearning, done with all regret,
Doubt, fear, hope, sorrow, all forever past;
Past all the hours, or slow of wing or fleet—
It must be sweet, it must be very sweet!

— Ina Coolbrith

At a literary dinner on May 5, 1874, Coolbrith was elected an honorary member of the Bohemian Club, the second of four women so honored. This allowed the members of the club to discreetly assist her in her finances, but their help was not enough to cover her full burden. Coolbrith moved to Oakland to set up a larger household for her extended family. Coolbrith's sister Agnes died late in 1874, and the orphaned niece and nephew continued to live with Coolbrith and Calla Shasta. Coolbrith wrote "Beside the Dead" in grief from the loss of her sister. Her mother Agnes died in 1876.

To support the household, in late 1874 Coolbrith took a position as the librarian for the Oakland Library Association, a subscription library that had been established five years earlier. In 1878, the library was reformed as the Oakland Free Library, the second public library created in California under the Rogers Free Library Act (Eureka was first). Coolbrith earned a salary of $80 per month, much less than a man would have received. She worked 6 days a week, 12 hours a day. Her poetry suffered as a result. She published only sporadically over the next 19 years—working as Oakland's librarian was the low point of her poetic career.

"...I named you 'Noble'. That is what you were to me—noble. That was the feeling I got from you. Oh, yes, I got, also, the feeling of sorrow and suffering, but dominating them, always riding above all, was noble. No woman has so affected me to the extent you did. I was only a little lad. I knew absolutely nothing about you. Yet in all the years that have passed I have met no woman so noble as you."
—Jack London, in a letter to Coolbrith

At the library, her style was personal: she discussed with the patrons their interests, and she selected books she felt were appropriate. In 1886, she befriended and mentored the 10-year-old Jack London, guiding his reading. London called her his "literary mother". Twenty years later, London wrote to Coolbrith to thank her.

Coolbrith also mentored young Isadora Duncan, who later described Coolbrith as "a very wonderful" woman, with "very beautiful eyes that glowed with burning fire and passion". Magazine writer Samuel Dickson reported that, at a soirée in 1927, an aging Coolbrith told him of the famous lovers she had known, and that she had once dazzled Joseph Duncan, Isadora's father. Coolbrith said that his attentions led to the breakup of his marriage. Duncan's mother left San Francisco and settled her four children in Oakland, little knowing that Coolbrith would soon meet one of her children, and help the young dancer develop a wider knowledge of the world through reading. Duncan wrote in her autobiography that, as a librarian, Coolbrith was always pleased with the youthful dancer's book choices, and that Duncan did not find out until later that Coolbrith was "evidently the great passion of [Joseph Duncan's] life".

Coolbrith's nephew Henry Frank Peterson came to work with her at the library, and began to organize the books into a faceted classification scheme that she specified, one which used one- and two-digit numbers to stand for general subjects, and three-digit numbers to indicate individual books in that subject. Before this, Coolbrith had resisted library trustee attempts to classify the books; she had wished to continue the reading-room atmosphere that she had established.

In 1881, Coolbrith's poetry was published in book form, entitled A Perfect Day, and Other Poems. Henry Wadsworth Longfellow, after Coolbrith's publisher sent him a copy, said "I know that California has at least one poet." Of the poems, he said "I have been reading them with delight." Yale poet Edward Rowland Sill, professor at the University of California and a keen critic of American literature, gave Coolbrith a letter of introduction that he wished her to send to publisher Henry Holt. It said, simply, "Miss Ina Coolbrith, one of our few really literary persons in California, and the writer of many lovely poems; in fact, the most genuine singer the West has yet produced." Quaker poet and former abolitionist John Greenleaf Whittier wrote to Coolbrith from Amesbury, Massachusetts, to share his opinion that her "little volume" of poetry, "which has found such favor with all who have seen it on this side of the Rocky mountains", should be republished on the East Coast. He told her "there is no verse on the Pacific Slope which has the fine quality of thine."

Beginning as early as 1865 in San Francisco, Coolbrith held literary meetings at her home, hosting readings of poetry, and topical discussions, in the tradition of European salons. She helped writers such as Gelett Burgess and Laura Redden Searing gain wider notice.

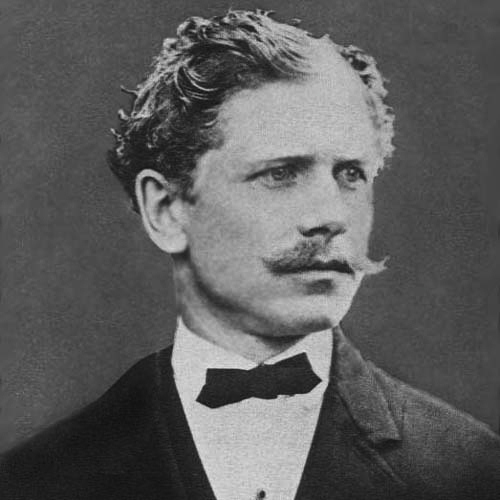
Until he criticized her in writing, Coolbrith considered Ambrose Bierce a good friend.

Once warmly social with her, in the 1880s Ambrose Bierce turned his caustic pen to criticism of Coolbrith's work, and thus lost her as a friend. In 1883, he wrote that her finely-wrought poem "Our Poets" should have been made a dirge, as the great poets of California were dead. He wrote that the periodical she worked for should be named the Warmed-Overland Monthly because it delivered nothing new. Regarding her poem "Unattained", Bierce complained of "this dainty writer's tiresome lugubriousness." In response, Coolbrith sided with those who said his incessant needling led local writer David Lesser Lezinsky to suicide.

The Poet

He walks with God upon the hills!
And sees, each morn, the world arise
New-bathed in light of paradise.
He hears the laughter of her rills,
Her melodies of many voices,
And greets her while his heart rejoices.
She to his spirit undefiled,
Makes answer as a little child;
Unveiled before his eyes she stands,
And gives her secret to his hands.

— Ina Coolbrith

Coolbrith published poems in The Century in 1883, 1885, 1886 and 1894. All four poems were included in Coolbrith's 1895 book, Songs from the Golden Gate—a re-issue of her earlier 1881 collection, with some 40 poems added. In New York, Coolbrith was acknowledged by a reviewer in the monthly journal Current Opinion as "a true, melodious and natural singer. Her work is characterized by great delicacy and refinement of feeling, and comprises dainty love songs, verses of deep religious feeling, stately odes, written for special occasions, and charming bits of description."

In September 1892, Coolbrith was given three days' notice to clear her desk, to be replaced as librarian by her nephew Henry Frank Peterson. A library trustee was quoted as saying "we need a librarian not a poet." Coolbrith's literary friends were outraged, and published a lengthy opinion piece to that effect in the San Francisco Examiner. Peterson's plans for the library were quite successful, however; under his guidance circulation quickly grew from 3,000 to 13,000. Peterson opened the library on Sundays and holidays and increased accessibility to the stacks—he was praised by trustees for his "management improvements".

In 1893 at the World's Congress of Representative Women, held at the beginning of the World's Columbian Exposition in Chicago, Coolbrith was described by Ella Sterling Cummins (later Mighels) as "the best known of California writers... who stands peerless at the head." Coolbrith was commissioned to write a poem for the Exposition, and in October 1893 she brought with her to Chicago the poem "Isabella of Spain" to help dedicate Harriet Hosmer's sculpture Queen Isabella which stood before the Pampas Plume Palace within the California Pavilion. Listening to Coolbrith were well-known women such as suffragist Susan B. Anthony and journalist Lilian Whiting. During Coolbrith's visit, Charlotte Perkins Stetson, her friend from the Pacific Coast Woman's Press Association (the two women served as president and vice-president, respectively), wrote to May Wright Sewall on her behalf; Stetson observed that Coolbrith could benefit from introductions to Chicago's best writers.

Coolbrith's difficulties in Oakland, followed by her trip to Chicago, unsettled her friends, who did not wish to see her move away and "become an alien" to California. John Muir had long been in the habit of sending Coolbrith letters, as well as the occasional box of fruit (such as cherries picked from the trees on his Martinez estate). He made such an offering in late 1894, accompanied by a suggestion for a new career which he thought would keep her in the area: she could fill the position of San Francisco's librarian, recently vacated by John Vance Cheney. Coolbrith sent a response to Muir, thanking him for "the fruit of your land, and the fruit of your brain". After signing the letter "your old-time friend", she added a post-script comment: "No, I cannot have Mr. Cheney's place. I am disqualified by sex." At that time, San Francisco required that their librarian be a man.

In 1894, Coolbrith honored poet Celia Thaxter with a memorial poem entitled "The Singer of the Sea". Thaxter had been to the Atlantic Monthly what Coolbrith was to the Overland Monthly: its "lady poet" who submitted verse containing "local color".

The Sea-Shell

"And love will stay, a summer's day!"
A long wave rippled up the strand,
She flashed a white hand through the spray
And plucked a sea-shell from the sand;
And laughed—"O doubting heart, have peace!
When faith of mine shall fail to thee
This fond, remembering shell will cease
To sing its love, the sea."

Ah, well! sweet summer's past and gone,—
And love, perchance, shuns wintry weather,—
And so the pretty dears are flown
On lightsome, careless wings together.
I smile: this little pearly-lined,
Pink-veined shell she gave to me,
With foolish, faithful lips to find
Still sing its love, the sea.

— Ina Coolbrith

A second poetry collection, Songs from the Golden Gate, was published in 1895. It contained "The Mariposa Lily", a description of California's natural beauty, and "The Captive of the White City", which detailed the cruel mistreatment of Native Americans in the late 19th century. In addition, the collection included "The Sea-Shell" and "Sailed", two poems in which Coolbrith described a woman's love with deep sympathy and unusually vivid physical imagery, in a way that presaged the later Imagist school of Ezra Pound and Robert Frost. The book included four monochrome reproductions of paintings by William Keith that he had devised as visual representations of the poetry. It was well received in London, where editor Albert Kinross of The Outlook papered the walls of the London Underground with posters announcing "his great discovery".

Connections among Coolbrith's circle of friends resulted in a librarian job at San Francisco's Mercantile Library Association in 1898, and she moved back to Russian Hill in San Francisco. In January 1899, artist William Keith and poet Charles Keeler obtained for her a part-time position as librarian of the Bohemian Club, of which Keith and Keeler were members. Her first assignment was to edit Songs from Bohemia, a book of poems by Daniel O'Connell, Bohemian Club co-founder and journalist, following his death. Her salary was $50 each month, less than she had been earning in Oakland, but her duties were light enough that she was able to devote a greater proportion of her time to writing, and she signed on as sometime staff of Charles Fletcher Lummis's The Land of Sunshine magazine. As a personal project, she began to work on a history of California literature.

== Earthquake and fire ==
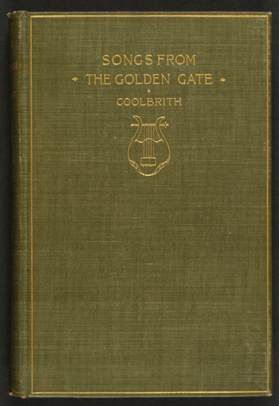
Songs from the Golden Gate (1895)

By February 1906, Coolbrith's health was showing signs of deterioration. She was often sick in bed with rheumatism, and hard-pressed to continue her work at the Bohemian Club. Still, in March 1906 she gave a lengthy reading to the Pacific Coast Woman's Press Association entitled "Some Women Poets of America." Coolbrith, third vice president and life member of the club, briefly discussed the most prominent early American women poets but focused more fully on ones that became known in the second half of the 19th century, reciting example verse, and critically evaluating the work.

A month later, disaster struck in the form of the calamitous fire that followed the great San Francisco earthquake in April 1906: Coolbrith's home at 1604 Taylor Street burned to the ground. Directly after the earthquake but before fire threatened, Coolbrith had left her house carrying a pet cat, thinking she would soon return. Her student boarder Robert Norman and her companion Josephine Zeller were unable to carry more than another cat, a few small bundles of letters and Coolbrith's scrapbook. Immediately after he spotted heavy smoke from across the bay, Joaquin Miller took the ferry from Oakland to San Francisco in order to assist Coolbrith in saving her valuables from the approaching fire, but was prevented from doing so by soldiers who had orders to use deadly force against looters. In the blaze, Coolbrith lost 3,000 books including priceless signed first editions, artwork by Keith, many personal letters from famous people such as Whittier, Clemens, George Meredith and, worst of all, her nearly complete manuscript that was part autobiography and part history of California's early literary scene.

"Were I to write what I know, the book would be too sensational to print, but were I to write what I think proper, it would be too dull to read."
—Ina Coolbrith, on the absence of an autobiography

Coolbrith never resumed the work of writing the history, as she was unable to balance its revelatory autobiographical truth with the scandal that would then ensue. In her life, there were rumors that she had accepted men such as Harte, Stoddard, Clemens and Miller as occasional lovers—a book discussing these liaisons was one she considered too controversial.

Coolbrith spent a few years in temporary residences while friends rallied to raise money to build a house for her. From New York, Coolbrith's old associate Mark Twain sent three autographed photographs of himself that sold for $10 apiece—he was subsequently convinced to sit for 17 more studio photographs to add further to the fund. In February 1907, the San Jose Women's Club hosted an event called "Ina Coolbrith Day" to promote interest in legislating a state pension for Coolbrith, and in a book project being put forward by the Spinners' Club. In June 1907, the Spinners' Club printed a book entitled The Spinners' book of fiction whose proceeds were to be given to Coolbrith. Frank Norris, Mary Hallock Foote and Mary Hunter Austin were among the authors who contributed stories. The poet George Sterling, a friend from the Bohemian Club, submitted an introductory poem, and Bohemian Maynard Dixon was among the illustrators. The driving force behind the effort was Gertrude Atherton, a writer who saw in Coolbrith a connection to California's literary origins. When the book failed to produce sufficient funding, Atherton added enough from her own pocket to start construction.

A new house was built for Coolbrith at 1067 Broadway on Russian Hill. Settled there, she resumed hosting salons. In 1910, she received a trust fund from Atherton. During 1910–1914, with money from Atherton and a discreet grant from her Bohemian friends, Coolbrith spent time going between residences in New York City and San Francisco, writing poetry. In four winters, she wrote more poetry than in the preceding 25 years.

== Poet laureate ==
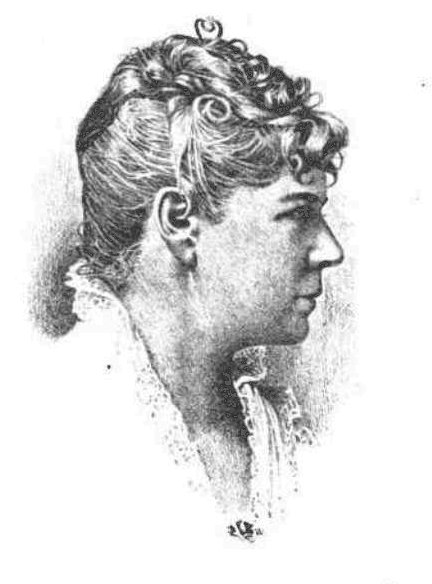
Portrait of Coolbrith from a publication of her poem California, 1918

In 1911, Coolbrith accepted the presidency of the Pacific Coast Woman's Press Association, and a park was dedicated to her, Ina Coolbrith Park, located at 1715 Taylor Street, one block from her pre-earthquake home. Coolbrith was named honorary member of the California Writers Club around 1913, a group that eventually grew into a state-wide organization. In 1913, Ella Sterling Mighels founded the California Literature Society which met informally once a month at Coolbrith's Russian Hill home, newspaper columnist and literary critic George Hamlin Fitch presiding. Mighels, who has been called California's literary historian, credited her breadth of knowledge to Coolbrith and the society meetings.

In preparation for the 1915 Panama–Pacific International Exposition in San Francisco, Coolbrith was named President of the Congress of Authors and Journalists. In this position she sent more than 4,000 letters to the world's most well-known writers and journalists. At the Exposition itself on June 30, Coolbrith was lauded by Senator James D. Phelan who said that her early associate Bret Harte called her the "sweetest note in California literature." Phelan continued, "she has written little, but that little is great. It is of the purest quality, finished and perfect, as well as full of feeling and thought." The Overland Monthly reported that "eyes were wet throughout the large audience" when Coolbrith was crowned with a laurel wreath by Benjamin Ide Wheeler, President of the University of California, who called her the "loved, laurel-crowned poet of California." After several more speeches were made in her honor, and bouquets brought in abundance to the podium, Coolbrith, wearing a black robe with a sash bearing a garland of bright orange California poppies, addressed the crowd, saying, "There is one woman here with whom I want to share these honors: Josephine Clifford McCracken. For we are linked together, the last two living members of Bret Harte's staff of Overland writers." McCracken was then ushered up from her seat in the audience to join Coolbrith. Coolbrith's official status as California Poet Laureate was confirmed in 1919 as the "Loved Laurel Crowned Poet of California" by the California State Senate with no financial support attached.

Several months after the San Francisco fair, at the Panama–California Exposition held in San Diego, festivities included a series of Authors' Days, featuring 13 California writers. November 2, 1915, was "Ina Coolbrith Day": her poems were recited, a lecture on her life was given by George Wharton James, and her poetry was set to music and performed on piano and voice, with compositions by James, Humphrey John Stewart, and Amy Beach.

In 1916, Coolbrith sent copies of her poetry collections to her cousin Joseph F. Smith who publicized her sending them to him and her identity as a niece of Joseph Smith, which upset her. She told him that "To be crucified for a faith in which you believe is to be blessed. To be crucified for one in which you do not believe is to be crucified indeed." She assured him she was not angry but she certainly was not pleased.

Coolbrith continued to write and work to support herself. From 1909 to final publication in 1917, she painstakingly collected and edited a book of Stoddard's poetry, writing a foreword and joining her short memorial poem "At Anchor" to verse submitted by Stoddard's friends Joaquin Miller, George Sterling and Thomas Walsh. At the age of 80, McCracken wrote to Coolbrith to complain to her dear friend of still having to work for a living: "The world has not used us well, Ina; California has been ungrateful to us. Of all the hundred thousands the state pays out in pensions of one kind and another, don't you think you should be at the head of the pensioners, and I somewhere down below?"

== Death and legacy ==
Coolbrith portrait by Ansel Adams

In May 1923, Coolbrith's friend Edwin Markham found her at the Hotel Latham in New York, "very old, ill and moneyless". He asked Lotta Crabtree to gather help for her. Crippled with arthritis, Coolbrith was brought back to California where she settled in Berkeley to be cared for by her niece. In 1924, Mills College conferred upon her an honorary Master of Arts degree. Coolbrith published Retrospect: In Los Angeles in 1925. In April 1926, she received visitors such as her old friend, art patron Albert M. Bender, who brought young Ansel Adams to meet her. Adams made a photographic portrait of Coolbrith seated near one of her white Persian cats and wearing a large white mantilla on her head.

Coolbrith died on Leap Day, February 29, 1928, and was buried in Mountain View Cemetery in Oakland. Her grave (located in Plot 11 at 37.8332°N 122.2390°W) was unmarked until 1986 when a literary society known as The Ina Coolbrith Circle placed a headstone. Her name is commemorated by Mount Ina Coolbrith, a 7,900-foot (2,400 m) peak near Beckwourth Pass in the Sierra Nevada mountains near State Route 70. Near her Russian Hill home, Ina Coolbrith Park, established earlier as a series of terraces ascending a steep hill, received a memorial plaque placed in 1947 by the San Francisco parlors of the Native Daughters of the Golden West. The park is known for its "meditative setting and spectacular bay views".

Wings of Sunset, a book of Coolbrith's later poetry, was published in the year after her death. Charles Joseph MacConaghy Phillips edited the collection, and wrote a brief memorial to Coolbrith's life.

In 1933, the University of California established the Ina Coolbrith Memorial Poetry Prize, given annually to authors of the best unpublished poems written by undergraduate students enrolled at the University of the Pacific, Mills College, Stanford University, Santa Clara University, Saint Mary's College of California, and any of the University of California campuses.

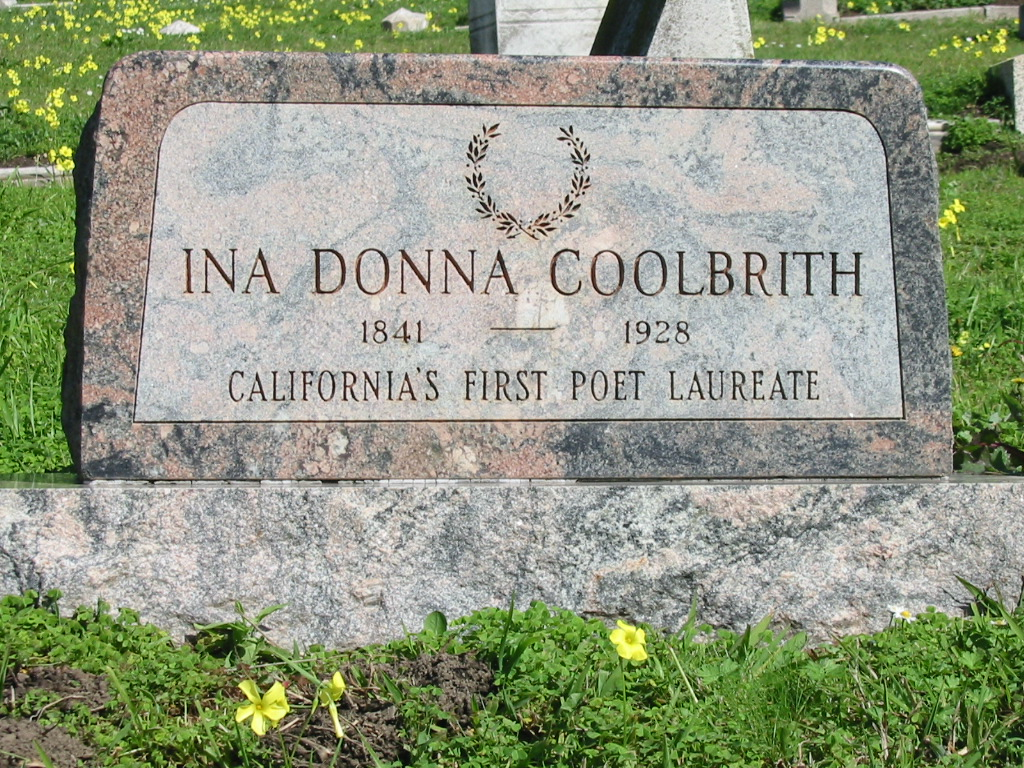
The Ina Coolbrith Circle emplaced this laurel wreath-engraved headstone in 1986.

The California Writers Club (CWC) occasionally selects a member, one distinguished by "exemplary service", to receive the Ina Coolbrith Award. In 2009, the award was given to Joyce Krieg, editor of the CWC Bulletin. In 2011, Kelly Harrison received the award for work on the anthology West Winds Centennial. In his 1997 novel Separations, author Oakley Hall set Coolbrith and others of her 1870 literary circle as main characters in the story. Hall was sympathetic to Coolbrith's legacy, himself helping to develop new California writers through the forum Squaw Valley Writer's Conference.

In 2001, a $63,000 sculpture by Scott Donahue was placed in Oakland's central Frank Ogawa Plaza, adjacent to Oakland City Hall. The artist said his 13-foot-2-inch (4.01 m) polychrome patchwork statue was a composite image of 20 women, historic and current, important to Oakland, including Coolbrith, Isadora Duncan, Julia Morgan and more. Entitled Sigame/Follow Me, the sculpture elicited protests because the city did not follow its own process for acquiring public art and because "some people", according to Ben Hazard, Oakland's Craft and Cultural Arts Department leader, "just don't like the sculpture's looks". By late 2004, the sculpture had been removed to a remote former industrial site called Union Point Park on the Oakland Estuary, opening to the public in 2005.

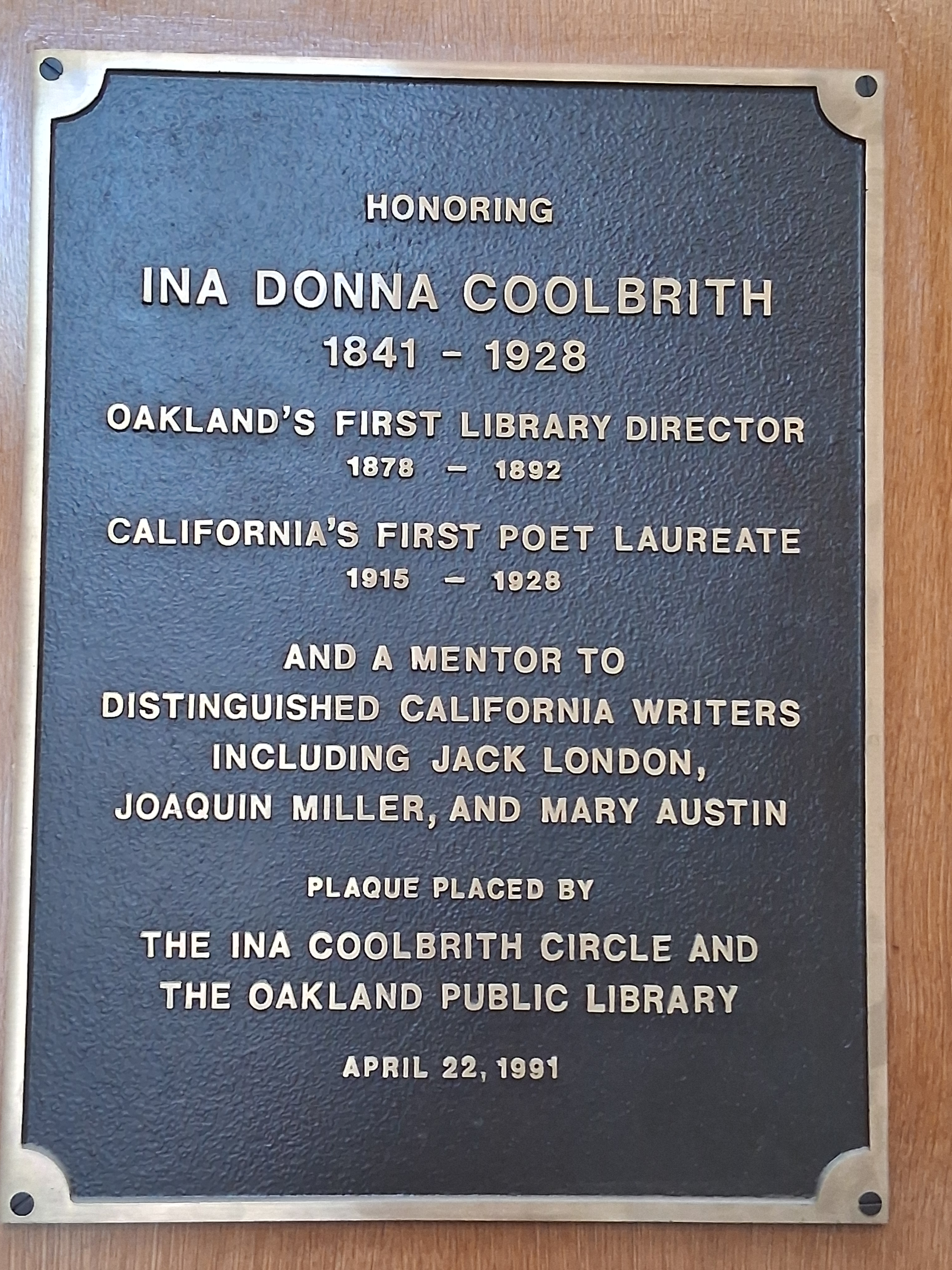
Plaque in Oakland Public Library

The City of Berkeley in 2003 installed a series of 120 poem-imprinted cast-iron plates flanking one block of a downtown street, to become the Addison Street Poetry Walk. Former U.S. Poet Laureate Robert Hass determined that one of Coolbrith's works should be included. A 55-pound (25 kg) plate bearing Coolbrith's poem "Copa De Oro (The California Poppy)" in raised porcelain enamel text is set into the sidewalk at the high-traffic northwest corner of Addison and Shattuck Avenues.

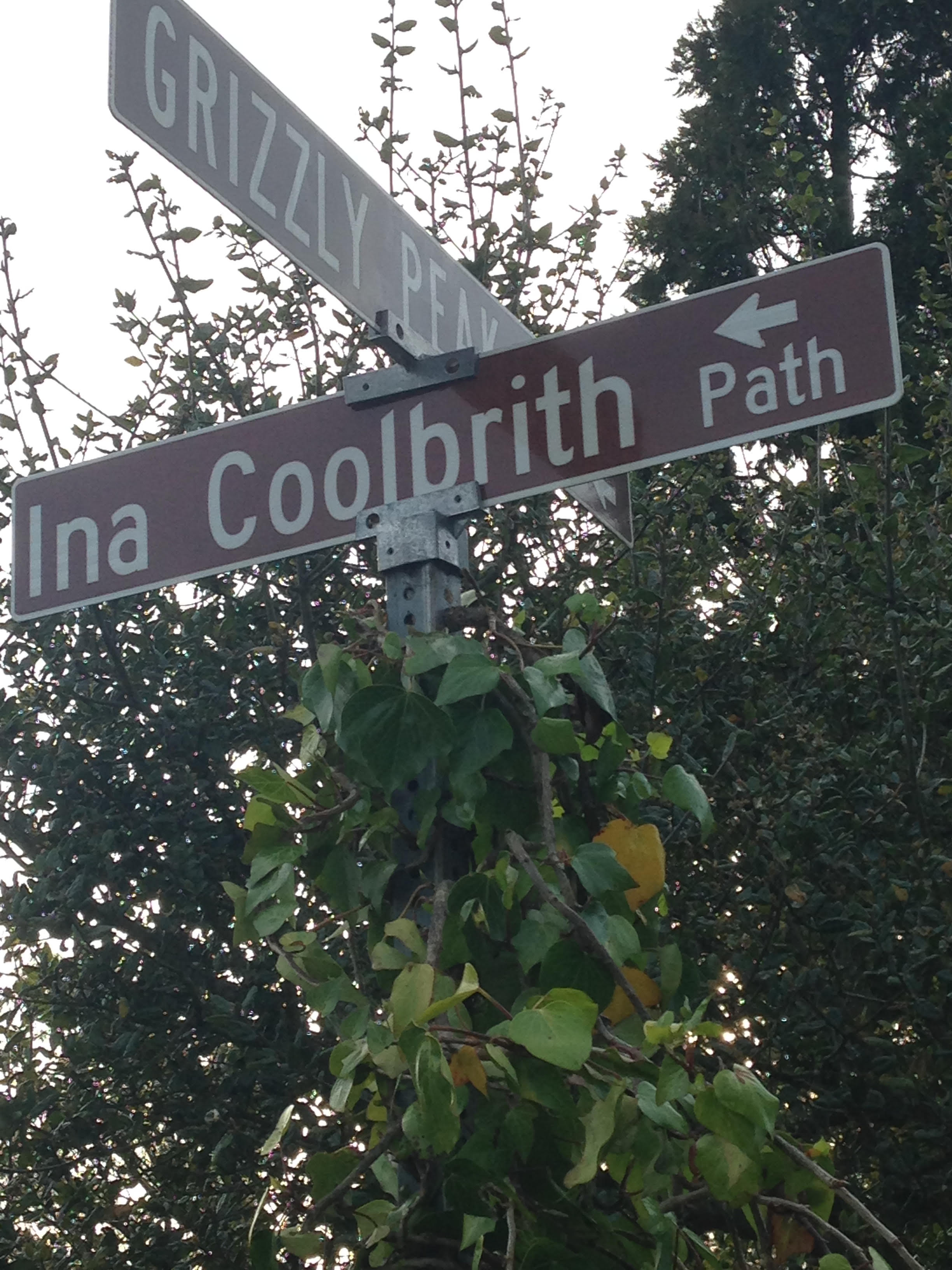
Ina Coolbrith Path

In 2016, a path in the Berkeley Hills was renamed for Coolbrith. When byways in the Berkeley hills were named after Bret Harte, Charles Warren Stoddard, Mark Twain, and other literati in Coolbrith's circle, women were not included. Through the efforts of the City of Berkeley, the Berkeley Historical Society, the Berkeley Historical Plaque Project, and the Berkeley Path Wanderers Association, the name of a stairway in the hills that connects Grizzly Peak Boulevard and Miller Avenue was changed from Bret Harte Lane to Ina Coolbrith Path. (Bret Harte still has three byways named for him in the area.) At the bottom of the stairway, the Berkeley Historical Society has installed a plaque to commemorate Coolbrith.

== See also ==
- List of descendants of Joseph Smith Sr. and Lucy Mack Smith
