= John Ferguson Ryland =

American judge (1797–1873)

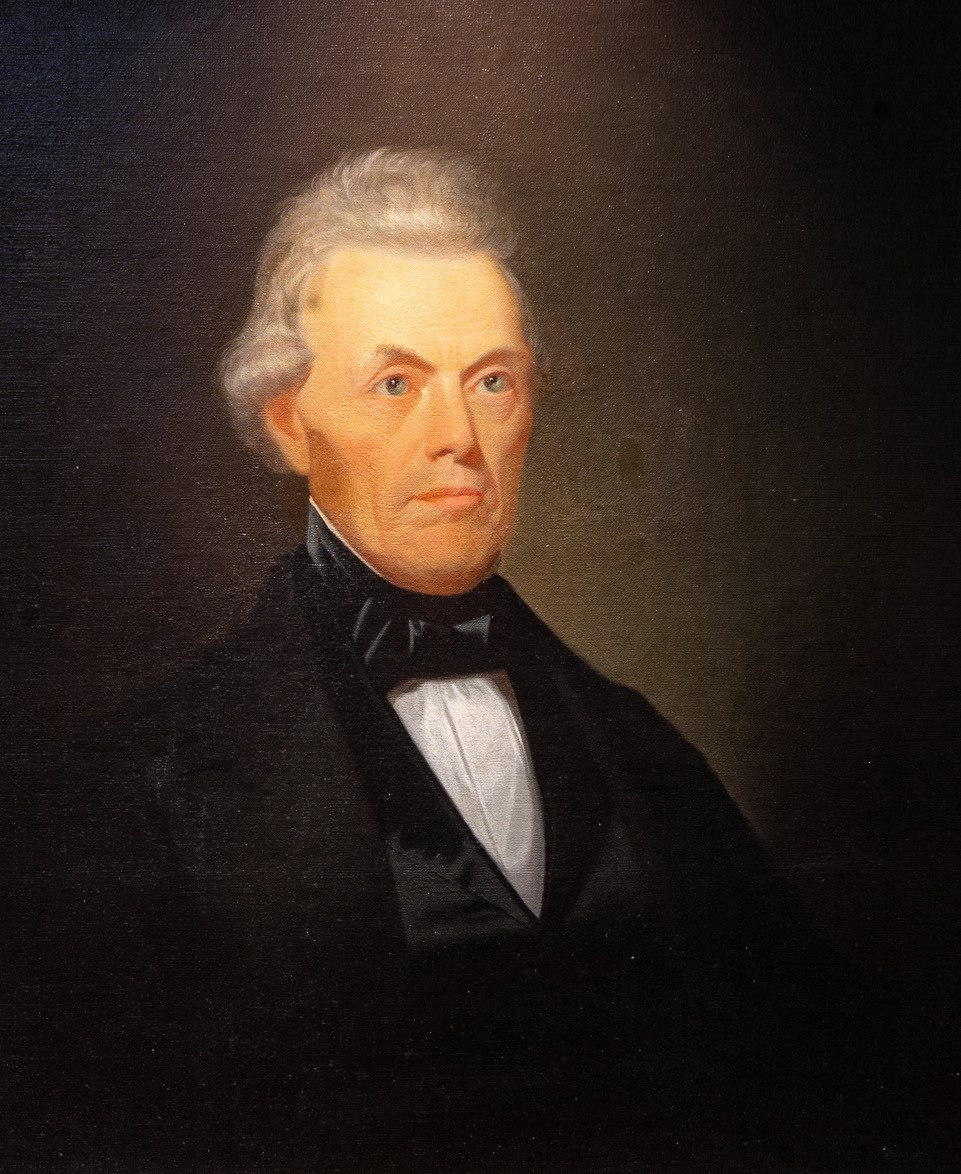

Judge of the Missouri Supreme Court
- In office 1849–1857
- Appointed by: Austin A. King
- Preceded by: William Barclay Napton
- Succeeded by: John Crowley Richardson

Personal details
- Born: November 2, 1797 King and Queen County, Virginia, U.S.
- Died: September 10, 1873 (age 75) Lafayette County, Missouri, U.S.
- Spouse(s): Martha Barrett; Elizabeth Garbrille Buford
- Children: 10, including Caius

John Ferguson Ryland (November 2, 1797 – September 10, 1873) was a justice of the Supreme Court of Missouri.

Born in King and Queen County, Virginia, in 1811 his father moved to Jessamine County, Kentucky, where he died in the following year, leaving a widow and eight children. Ryland, the oldest of these children, spent much of childhood on Kentucky, where he "received a classical education at the Forest Hill Academy". He taught school for a number of years, and read law in his leisure hours. In 1820, he relocated to Missouri, where he entered the practice of law.

In 1830 the Missouri Legislature created a new judicial circuit, the Sixth Circuit, composed of the entire western portion of the State and extending from Iowa to Arkansas. Ryland was appointed as its judge on January 18, 1831. In that capacity, Ryland presided over the criminal prosecutions arising from the events known as the Mormon War. Ryland held that office until 1849, when he was appointed to the Missouri Supreme Court. He was reelected to the supreme court in 1851, serving to the completion of his term in 1857. While on the Supreme Court bench he wrote a number of important opinions, particularly in criminal cases. He was on the court that heard the 1852 case of Emerson v. Scott, a predecessor to the Dred Scott decision in the Supreme Court of the United States. Ryland joined the majority opinion, which held that Dred Scott was legally an enslaved man.

Following his judicial service, Ryland resumed the practice of his profession. During the American Civil War, Ryland "remained a steadfast Union man". Though a slaveholder, he believed the institution to be a detriment to the South. With the close of the war, he was an earnest advocate of restoring peace. In 1866, Ryland was elected to the Missouri State Legislature, where he served for one session, thereafter returning to the private practice of law.

He had two spouses. The first was Martha Barrett and the second was Elizabeth Garbrille Buford. He had 10 children, including Caius. Ryland died in Lafayette County, Missouri.

Political offices
Preceded by William Barclay Napton	Justice of the Missouri Supreme Court; 1849–1857	Succeeded by John Crowley Richardson
