= California Writers Club =

The California Writers Club traces its founding to the San Francisco Bay Area literary movement in the early part of the 20th century. It was conceived by Jack London, George Sterling, Austin Lewis (socialist), and Herman Whitaker after the San Francisco Earthquake. Lewis was the first president, elected in 1909.

The organization grew through gatherings of writers at Coppa's restaurant in San Francisco, Monterey and Carmel, and salons hosted by London and Joaquin Miller, the latter held in what is now known as Joaquin Miller Park. A quarterly bulletin under the guidance of Dr. William S. Morgan was established in 1912. All members of the Press Club of Alameda joined, and formalized the organization, which became incorporated in 1913, choosing the motto Sail On from the Joaquin Miller poem, "Columbus".

The general purposes of the California Writers Club are to provide a forum for literary criticism and for recognition of achievement, to discover new authors and assist them in developing their talent, and to sponsor educational meetings to promote professional growth.

== History ==
Early honorary members of the club included Jack London, George Sterling, John Muir, Joaquin Miller, and the first California poet laureate, Ina Coolbrith.

In 1914, the first edition of West Winds, a hardcover collection of fiction by members, was published. It was illustrated by local California artists. Since that time three other West Winds have been published.

The California Writers Club organized literary events in the prewar period; the first California Writers Club Conference was held in Oakland in 1941.

The CWC worked with the City of Oakland and the Works Progress Administration to build a "Temple for the Arts" in Joaquin Miller Park, featuring a cascade and amphitheater, dedicated in 1941. Through the 1980s, they celebrated California's great writers with the planting of trees in the California Writers Memorial Grove at Joaquin Miller Park in Oakland. The first tree was planted for Joaquin Miller. Bret Harte, Charles Warren Stoddard, Edward Rowland Sill, Ina Coolbrith, Jack London, Mark Twain, Charles Fletcher Lummis, and Edwin Markham are so honored as well as Dashiell Hammett, Gertrude Stein, and historians, Will Durant and Ariel Durant.

The California Writers Club also organized social events with a literary orientation.

In 2003, the California Writers Club worked to establish a week to celebrate and recognize California Writers. The result of this effort occurred on September 4, 2003, when the California State Assembly officially declared the third week in October of each year as California Writers Week (Members Resolution No. 2170). The Resolution is endorsed by the California Library Association.

=== Notable members ===
- Austen Lewis
- Charles Keeler
- Gertrude Mott
- Hester A. Benedict
- Agnes Morley Cleaveland
- Ray Nelson
- Winifred Davidson
- Belle Willey Gue
- Stella Wynne Herron
- Vingie E. Roe
- Geneve L. A. Shaffer
- Anna Kalfus Spero

== Present day ==
Today, writers conferences are held by several of the Club's branches, such as South Bay's East of Eden Writers Conference, San Francisco/Peninsula's Jack London Writers Conference, and San Fernando Valley's conferences. Each attracts from 100 to 400 writers and dozens of literary agents, editors, authors, and publishers from all over the United States to present lectures, workshops, and panel discussions on all aspects of the writing life. The California Writers Club Writer-in-Residence sits on the board of Friends of Joaquin Miller Park and hosts literary events in the Park.

Every other year, each branch selects one member to receive a Jack London Service Award in recognition of their contributions to the Club.

Today, the California Writers Club has more than 1,900 members in 21 branches spread throughout California.
