= Rogers Free Library Act =

California State Senate
- Citation: California State Assembly. "An Act to establish and maintain free public libraries and reading-rooms". Twenty-second Session of the Legislature. Statutes of California. State of California. Ch. CCLXVI p. 329.
- Enacted by: California State Senate
- Enacted by: California State Assembly
- Enacted: March 11, 1878
- Commenced: March 18, 1878

Often referred to as the Rogers Free Library Act, the Rogers Act of 1878 (officially, California State Senate Bill Number 1) was an 1877 bill written in the upper house of the California State Legislature and signed into law on March 18, 1878, by Governor of California William Irwin. It was entitled "An Act to establish and maintain free public libraries and reading rooms" and popularly named after its lead author, State Senator George H. Rogers.

== Content ==
The general provisions were permissive rather than mandatory. They granted authority for public library maintenance to California's incorporated municipal governments; allowed cities to levy taxes "not to exceed one mill on the dollar" (a property tax rate equal to 1/10 of one cent per dollar of assessed value) to support public libraries; and set limits on the powers of library trustees.

The law specifically appointed 11 founding members to the Library Board of Trustees for the City and County of San Francisco:

- George H. Rogers, state senator
- John S. Hager, former U.S. senator
- Irving M. Scott, Union Iron Works
- Robert J. Tobin, Hibernia Bank
- E. D. Sawyer
- John H. Wise
- Andrew J. Moulder, superintendent of schools
- Louis Sloss, Alaska Commercial Company
- A. S. Hallidie
- C. C. Terrell
- Henry George

== History ==
The public library is the complement of the public school; it is a great educational institution. It teaches, it amuses, it refines, it occupies, it protects; it stimulates the ambition of the listless; it revives the hope of the despairing; it consoles the sorrowful. Nothing would be a greater attraction for many intelligent people; nothing would have a stronger influence to fortify the morals of the young men of our city, and draw them away from the evil associations into which they are thrown when they spend their evenings in the open street.

— Daily Alta California (August 5, 1877)

While prior to 1878, the California cities of Los Angeles, Marysville, and San Jose had organized public libraries within their municipalities, the Act resulted from the effort to organize what would become the San Francisco Public Library. A meeting was held on August 3, 1877 at Dashaway Hall in San Francisco; as reported by the Daily Alta California, the meeting was convened by Senator Rogers, who had surveyed "all the principal libraries in the United States and Europe" with the intent to create a public library, which was deemed capable of "furnishing moral, religious and intellectual food for the masses." On August 5, the Daily Alta published an editorial describing their advice to an unidentified donor some years past, suggesting that he donate US$30,000 (equivalent to $890,000 in 2024) annually to allow the Mercantile Library, one of the private libraries that then existed in the city, to lend its collection freely. The initial meeting on August 3 concluded by resolving to draft legislation to be sent to Senator Rogers for consideration at the state level.

Eureka was the first city to reform its library into a free library following the passage of the Rogers Act, the Oakland Free Library was the second, and at least ten others were established within the first 24 months, including Chico (April 1879) and Sacramento (June 14, 1879).
