= Belle Willey Gue =

American writer

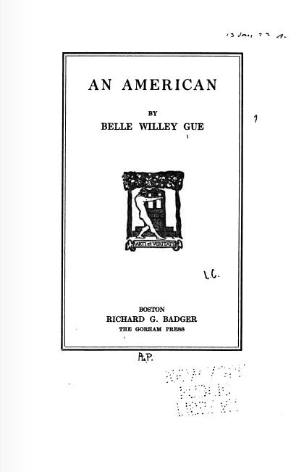
Belle Willey Gue, The American, 1921

Ruth Belle Willey Gue (April 8, 1860 – October 23, 1944) was an American writer and clubwoman, based in San Diego in later life. She wrote poetry, stories, and articles for magazines and newspapers, and published about a dozen books.

== Early life and education ==
Ruth Belle Willey was born on April 8, 1860, in Inland, Cedar County, Iowa, the daughter of Ward Willis Willey and Sarah Jennie Russel Willey. She graduated from Oberlin College in 1882

== Career ==
Gue's poems and stories appeared in the Los Angeles Times, The Cosmopolitan, Outdoor Life The Kindergarten Primary Magazine, and Overland Monthly. She also published about a dozen books, including historical fiction, dramas, and collections of verse. "Mrs. Gue undoubtedly has the poetic instinct and understands the art of versification," noted a 1905 reviewer in Nebraska, "but no one but a martyr or most intimate friend would want to read more than two of her eighty-four short poems at one sitting. There isn't a gleam of joy in the whole book – it is simply saturated sombreness."

In 1901, Gue was founding president of the Winside Woman's Club in Nebraska. In 1918, she wrote the lyrics for "Our Golden State", an entry in a patriotic song contest during World War I. She also wrote the lyrics of "The Elm Trees of Oberlin", which was sung at an alumni association event in San Diego in 1924. She was a member of the San Diego Writers' Club, California Writers Club, and the Oberlin Alumni Association.

== Personal life ==
She moved to California in 1913 and lived in San Diego. She married her cousin Willey Merrill Gue in 1885; They divorced in 1910, and he died in 1922. She died on October 23, 1944, and her grave is in San Diego.

== Publications ==
- Interludes: verses (1899)
- An American (1921)
- Grounded (1922)
- The Neutral Ground (1922)
- The Last Ditch (1923)
- The Fugitives (1923)
- George Washington (1924, drama)
- The Greatest Good (1926)
- Some Human Hearts
- Songs and Sonnets of the Sea (1927, verse)
- Washington, The Statesman (drama) (1928)
