= Berkeley Historical Society =

The Berkeley Historical Society is a non-profit association in Berkeley, California dedicated to researching, preserving and sharing the history of the city. It was founded in 1978. Its primary activity is the operation of the Berkeley History Center, a museum, library and archive located in the Veterans Memorial Building at 1931 Center Street near the old city hall. It is staffed entirely by volunteers. It presents exhibits, walking tours, lectures and other events and conducts oral histories.

The Berkeley Historical Society has published:

- Victorian Berkeley: The Community of Ocean View (1981)
- A Teacher's Guide to Primary Resources on Berkeley History (1983)
- Exactly Opposite the Golden Gate: Essays on Berkeley's History, 1845–1945 (1983)
- Tales from the Elmwood: A Community Memory (2000)
- Quick Index to the Origin of Berkeley's Names: Streets, Creeks, Paths, Walks, Parks (2004; 2nd ed. 2021)
- Berkeley Bohemia, 1890–1925 (2005)
- Tempered by Fire: History of the Berkeley Fire Department (2005; 2nd ed. 2022)
- Fermenting Berkeley: A Spirited History (2006)
- J. Stitt Wilson: Socialist, Christian, Mayor of Berkeley by Stephen E. Barton (2021)

== Official site ==
- Berkeley Historical Society website
