= List of wildfire behaviors =

List of fire behaviors

The following is a list of different types of wildfire behaviors. Many types of fire behaviors are known, but some still not fully understood.

List of fire behaviors
| Name | Description | Image | Caption | Notable Occasions |
|---|---|---|---|---|
| Flammagenitus cloud | A dense cumuliform cloud associated with fire or a volcanic eruption. Includes the pyrocumulus and the larger pyrocumulonimbus (Cumulonimbus Flammagenitus). | | A Pyrocumulus cloud created by the Boise Fire. | Many |
| Cumulonimbus flammagenitus/pyrocumulonimbus | A type of cumulonimbus cloud that forms above a heat source, typically a wildfire or volcano. Pyrocumulonimbus clouds can produce lightning, hail, erratic winds, and even tornadoes. However, they are not typically associated with significant precipitation. Typically indicative of intense fire activity. | A pyrocumulonimbus cloud created by the Creek Fire (2020). This photo is from the United States Forest Service, with no provided date. | A pyrocumulonimbus cloud created by the Creek Fire. | Dixie Fire Creek Fire (2020) 2019–20 Australian bushfire season Carr Fire |
| Plume-dominated fire behavior | This occurs when the fire's behavior is mostly controlled by winds generated by the fire's own plume. This could lead to erratic conditions such as a column collapse and rapid runs. | Typical appearance of a plume-dominated fire. This picture was taken at the Silver Fire in Oregon in 1987. | Typical appearance of a plume-dominated fire. This example is of the 1987 Silver Fire in Oregon. | Many |
| Running | This occurs when the head of the fire rapidly advances, along with an increase in fire intensity and rate of spread. | | | North Complex Fire Dixie Fire |
| Spotting | Spotting refers to the transport of burning pieces of firebrand by wind which may ignite new fires beyond the main fire. Spotting requires wind, and the firebrand often comes from a torching tree. There are two types of spotting: short-range spotting and long-range spotting. Short-range spotting occurs when the spot fire is not very far from the main fire, so it gets overrun. In long-range spotting, firebrands are often carried by a convection column away from the main fire area. | Diagram of how spotting occurs and the factors contributing to spotting | Diagram of how spotting occurs and the factors contributing to spotting. | Many |
| Torching | This occurs when the fire burns the foliage of trees from the bottom up. Occurs in crown fires, and tends to reinforce or increase the rate of spread. May lead to spotting. | Picture of trees being torched by a wildfire. Taken in the Tetlin National Wildlife Reserve in Alaska. | Trees being torched by a wildfire in Tetlin National Wildlife Reserve, located in Alaska. | Many |
| Creeping | This occurs when the fire burns with a low flame and spreads slowly. | Typical appearance of a creeping fire. | Typical appearance of a creeping fire. | Many |
| Smoldering | Smoldering is when a fire burns without much flame but with large amounts of smoke. It typically occurs after the flaming combustion phase. Smoldering fires contribute significantly to carbon emissions. Some examples include peat fires, which can last for several months. Holdover fires are a type of smoldering fire. | | A smouldering peat fire deep in the soil of the Great Dismal Swamp, on the border of Virginia and North Carolina | Many |
| Fire whirl/Fire tornado/Firenado | A spinning vortex column of ascending hot air and gases rising from a fire. Fire whirls can range from less than a meter in diameter up to possibly 3 kilometers in diameter. This phenomenon can pose significant danger to wildland firefighters. | A fire tornado on the Park Fire. | A fire tornado produced by the Park Fire. | Park Fire Carr Fire 2003 Canberra bushfires Loyalton Fire Creek Fire (2020) |
| Counter-rotating vortex pair (CRVP/CVP) | Two counter-rotating (one clockwise, one counterclockwise) vortices rotating around one another. May be dangerous to firefighters. | A counter-rotating vortex pair produced by the Mill Fire in 2024. Note the bifurcated plume. | A counter-rotating vortex pair produced by the Mill Fire in 2024. | El Dorado Fire |
| Column collapse | A column collapse occurs when the fire is no longer able to sustain its column, causing the column to collapse to the ground. It can send embers far from the fire past control lines and intensify the fire. This can pose a significant danger to firefighters. | | | Thomas Fire June 2017 Portugal wildfires 2017 Chile wildfires |
