= Carr Fire tornado =

2018 fire tornado in California, U.S.

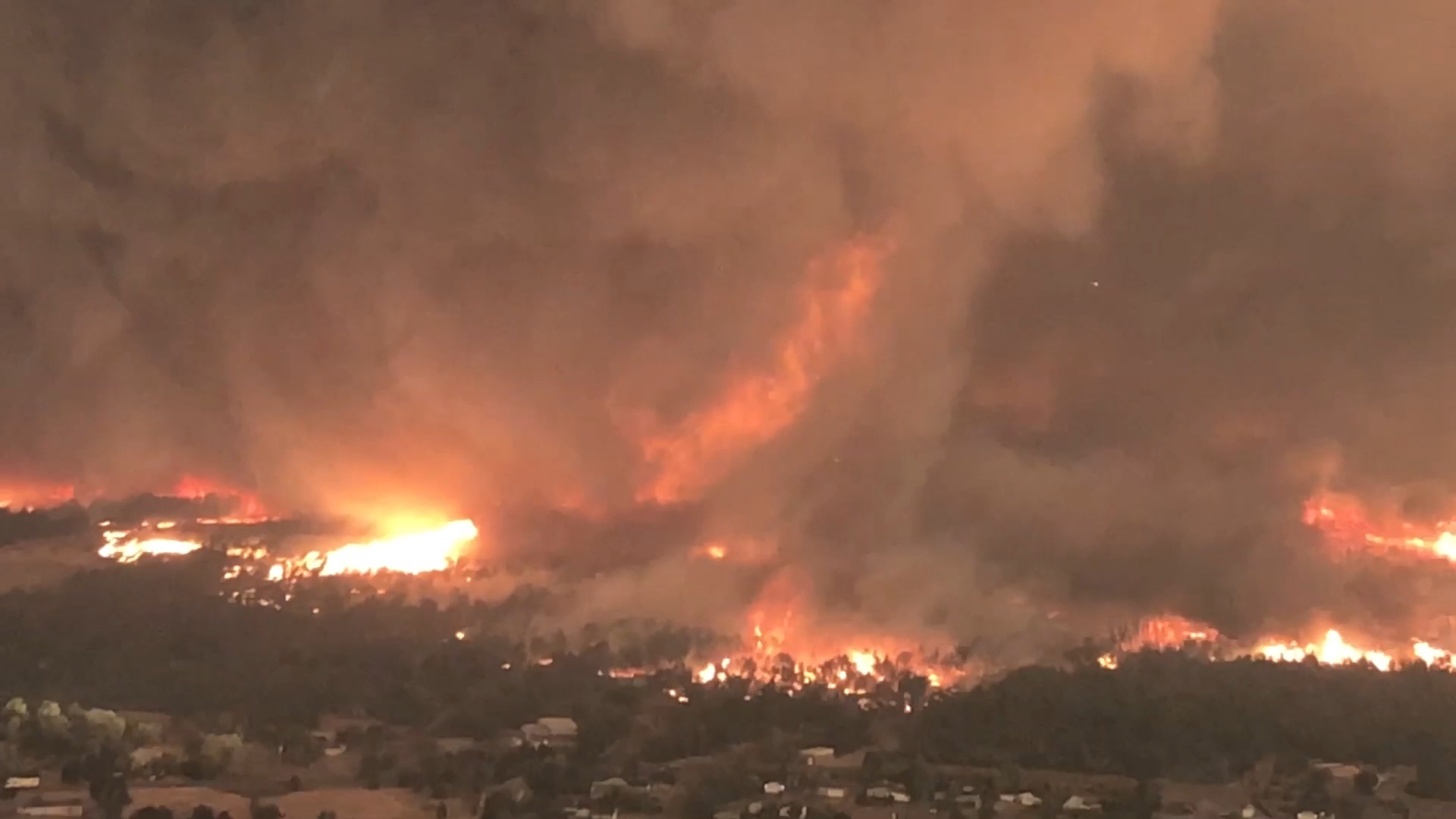
- The tornado at around its peak intensity near Redding, California.

Meteorological history
- Formed: July 26, 2018, ~7:30 p.m. CST (UTC–06:00)
- Dissipated: July 26, 2018, 8:00 p.m. CST (UTC–06:00)
- Duration: ~30 minutes

EF3-equivalent tornado
- Highest winds: 143 mph (230 km/h)

Overall effects
- Fatalities: 4
- Injuries: 6
- Areas affected: Redding, California
- Part of the Carr Fire and Tornadoes of 2018

In the evening hours of July 26, 2018, a large fire tornado formed inside of the Carr Fire. The fire tornado, which had peak wind speeds of 143 miles per hour (230 km/h), killed at least four people and injured six others while on the ground for approximately thirty minutes. The fire tornado was the most powerful in California history and was the deadliest fire tornado ever to form as part of a larger event. In addition, the fire tornado was the second ever to be recorded, after one that occurred in the 2003 Canberra bushfires. The tornado trapped several bulldozer operators in their vehicles, resulting in the death of Jeremy Stoke, 37, a fire inspector who was killed as the fire tornado tracked over him, and also killed three other people in a collapsed home. The event is officially listed as a fire whirl by the National Weather Service.

== Background ==
The Carr Fire was reported on the afternoon of July 23, 2018, at the intersection of SR 299 and Carr Powerhouse Road, in the Whiskeytown district of the Whiskeytown–Shasta–Trinity National Recreation Area, in Shasta County, California, near French Gulch. The fire was believed to have been started accidentally by a vehicle towing a dual-axle travel trailer. One of the tires on the trailer blew out, causing the steel rim to scrape along the pavement, generating sparks that ignited dry vegetation along the edge of the highway. Wind caused the fire to spread quickly. Hot conditions and steep, inaccessible terrain presented challenges for fire crews as they strengthened containment lines. SR 299 was closed, and French Gulch was placed under mandatory evacuation.

== Tornado summary ==
A fire engine dashcam video of the tornado, exhibiting strong rotation.

Between 8:24 and 8:36 CST, a tornado vortex signature was monitored on radar. The fire whirl developed within the Carr Fire in Redding, California. The fire tornado was first seen developing north of Land Park, and began to fill the sky with embers as it rapidly intensified. Several firefighters who were caught in the tornado ran and took refuge on Sutro Mine Road as the tornado passed over. Shortly after touching down, the tornado impacted a group of bulldozers that were sitting on Buenaventura Boulevard; every dozer and another car were burnt out and were rendered destroyed as a result. A driver of a California Department of Forestry and Fire Protection (CALFIRE) truck would say that as the tornado moved past his location, every windshield in the vehicle shattered and the truck was battered with large rocks and other debris carried by the fire tornado. A person who was attempting to enter another pickup truck nearby sustained severe burns as a result of the heat.

Remaining on the ground from 7:30–8:00 p.m., the fire whirl reached an estimated height of 18,000 ft (5,500 m) and caused extensive tornado-like damage while spreading the fire. The winds toppled transmission towers, shredded foliage, and debarked and uprooted trees. The smoke plume from the whirl dominated the site of the wildfire. Substantial damage occurred in areas untouched by fire, including signs of ground scouring. Three people were reportedly killed inside their Redding home after the structure's walls were blown out and the roof collapsed on the occupants. The winds needed to do the damage to the house was estimated to be in excess of 143 mph (230 km/h). Several other homes suffered significant roof damage. The heat of winds and debris within the fire tornado was estimated to be up to 2,700 °F (1,480 °C). It was reported that several firefighters were caught off guard as the tornado rapidly widened to 300 yards (270 m).

== Aftermath ==
=== Damage ===
The tornado heavily damaged several structures in the city of Redding, including homes and at least two electrical transmissions towers, both of which collapsed as the fire tornado moved by. The fire tornado also exhibited unusually strong winds, which were able to toss a large metal container.

=== Casualties ===
Four people were killed by the fire whirl; three people were killed in a home that collapsed, and a firefighter was killed while driving near the fire whirl.

List of finalized fatalities from the Carr Fire tornado - July 26, 2018
Name	Age	Date located	Location	Rank	Ref.
Jeremy Stoke	37	July 26, 2018	Benson Drive, Redding, California	Fire marshal	
James Roberts	5	July 28, 2018	Shasta County	N/A	
Emily Roberts	4	July 28, 2018	Shasta County	N/A	
Melody Bledsoe	70	July 28, 2018	Shasta County	N/A	

== See also ==
- List of wildfire behaviors

== Notes and footnotes ==
=== Sources ===
- CalFire (2018). "Burn Over Fatalities: Carr Incident". California Department of Forestry and Fire Protection. pp. 1–18.
