= Fire whirl =

Whirlwind induced by and often composed of fire

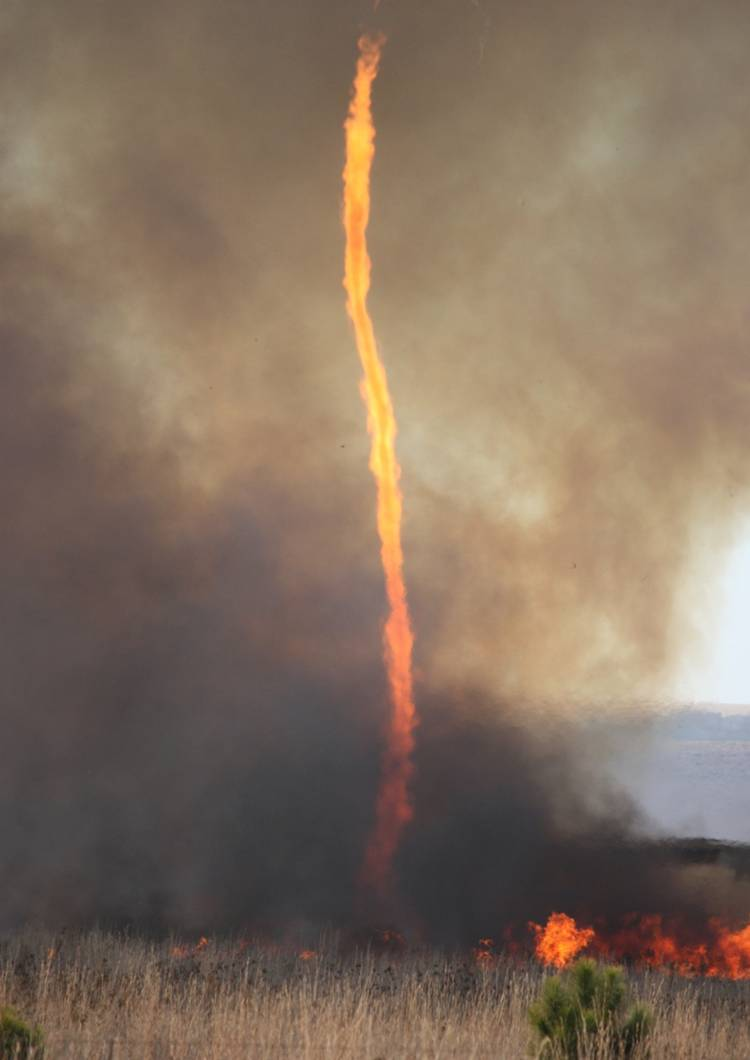
- A fire whirl with flames in the vortex
- Area of occurrence: Worldwide (most frequent in areas subject to wildfires)
- Season: All year (most frequent in dry season)
- Effect: Wind damage, burning, propagation/intensification of fires

A fire whirl, fire devil or fire tornado is a whirlwind induced by a fire and often (at least partially) composed of flame and/or ash. These start with a whirl of wind, often made visible by smoke, and may occur when intense rising heat and turbulent fire-caused wind conditions combine to form whirling eddies of air. These eddies can contract to a tornado-like vortex that ingests debris and combustible gases.

The phenomenon is sometimes labeled a fire tornado, firenado, fire swirl, fire wheel, or fire twister, but these terms usually refer to a separate phenomenon where a fire has such intensity that it generates an actual tornado, which is an intensely rotating vortex (column of air) in contact with the surface and a cumuliform cloud above. Fire whirls are not usually classifiable as tornadoes as the vortex in most cases does not extend from the surface to cloud base. Also, even in such cases, those fire whirls very rarely are classic tornadoes, as their vorticity derives from surface winds and heat-induced lifting, rather than from a tornadic mesocyclone aloft.

Although directly fire-spawned in flammagenitus clouds and mesocyclones within fire-induced cumulonimbus flammagenitus were for decades known to occasionally produce tornadic fire whirls, the phenomenon came to wider attention after the 2003 Canberra bushfires and with the 2018 Carr Fire in California, the 2020 Loyalton Fire in California and Nevada, and the 2025 Deer Creek Fire in Utah.

== Formation ==
A fire whirl consists of a burning core and a rotating pocket of air. A fire whirl can reach up to 1,400 °C (2,500 °F). Fire whirls become frequent when a wildfire, or especially firestorm, creates its own wind, which can spawn large vortices. Even bonfires often have whirls on a smaller scale and tiny fire whirls have been generated by very small fires in laboratories.

Most of the largest fire whirls are spawned from wildfires. They form when a warm updraft and convergence from the wildfire are present. They are usually 10–50 m (33–164 ft) tall, a few meters (several feet) wide, and last only a few minutes. Some, however, can be more than 1 km (5/8 mi) tall, contain wind speeds over 200 km/h (120 mph), and persist for more than 20 minutes.

Fire whirls can uproot trees 15 m (50 ft) tall or more. These can also aid the 'spotting' ability of wildfires to propagate and start new fires as they lift burning materials such as tree bark. These burning embers can be blown away from the fire-ground by the stronger winds aloft.

Fire whirls can be common within the vicinity of a plume during a volcanic eruption. These range from small to large and form from a variety of mechanisms, including those akin to typical fire whirl processes, but can result in Cumulonimbus flammagenitus (cloud) spawning landspouts and waterspouts or even to develop mesocyclone-like updraft rotation of the plume itself and/or of the cumulonimbi, which can spawn tornadoes similar to those in supercells. Pyrocumulonimbi generated by large fires on rare occasions also develop in a similar way.

== Classification ==
There are currently three widely recognized types of fire whirls:

- Type 1: Stable and centered over burning area.
- Type 2: Stable or transient, downwind of burning area.
- Type 3: Steady or transient, centered over an open area adjacent to an asymmetric burning area with wind.

There is evidence suggesting that the fire whirl in the Hifukusho-ato area, during the 1923 Great Kantō earthquake, was of type 3. Other mechanism and fire whirl dynamics may exist. A broader classification of fire whirls suggested by Forman A. Williams includes five different categories:

- Whirls generated by fuel distribution in wind
- Whirls above fuels in pools or on water
- Tilted fire whirls
- Moving fire whirls
- Whirls modified by vortex breakdown

The meteorological community views some fire-induced phenomena as atmospheric phenomena. Using the pyro- prefix, fire-induced clouds are called pyrocumulus and pyrocumulonimbus. Larger fire vortices are similarly being viewed. Based on vortex scale, the classification terms of pyronado, "pyrotornado", and "pyromesocyclone" have been proposed.

== Notable examples ==
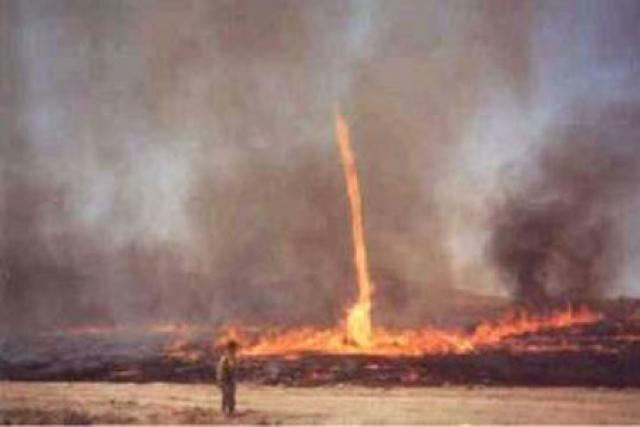
A flame-filled fire whirl

During the 1871 Peshtigo fire, the community of Williamsonville, Wisconsin, was burned by a fire whirl; the area where Williamsonville once stood is now Tornado Memorial County Park.

An extreme example of the phenomenon occurred in the aftermath of the 1923 Great Kantō earthquake in Japan, in which a city-wide firestorm in Tokyo produced the conditions required for a gigantic fire whirl that killed 38,000 people in fifteen minutes in the Hifukusho-Ato region of the city.

Numerous large fire whirls (some tornadic) that developed after lightning struck an oil storage facility near San Luis Obispo, California, on 7 April 1926, produced significant structural damage well away from the fire, killing two. Many whirlwinds were produced by the four-day-long firestorm coincident with conditions that produced severe thunderstorms, in which the larger fire whirls carried debris 5 km (3 mi) away.

Fire whirls were produced in the conflagrations and firestorms triggered by firebombings of European and Japanese cities during World War II and by the atomic bombings of Hiroshima and Nagasaki. Fire whirls associated with the bombing of Hamburg, particularly those of 27–28 July 1943, were studied.

Throughout the 1960s and 1970s, particularly in 1978–1979, fire whirls ranging from the transient and very small to intense, long-lived tornado-like vortices capable of causing significant damage were spawned by fires generated from the 1,000 MW-Météotron, a series of large oil wells located in the Lannemezan plain of France used for testing atmospheric motions and thermodynamics.

During the 2003 Canberra bushfires in Canberra, Australia, a violent fire whirl was documented. It was calculated to have horizontal winds of 260 km/h (160 mph) and vertical air speed of 150 km/h (93 mph), causing the flashover of 120 hectares (300 acres) in 0.04 seconds. It was the first known fire whirl in Australia to have EF3 wind speeds on the Enhanced Fujita scale.

On 16 August 2013, during the Tetlin Junction Ridge Fire in Alaska, a helicopter captured a strong fire tornado, reaching 3/4 of a mile wide at one point and lasting at least 1 hour, accompanied with extreme rotating motion. The footage also showed several large trees being tossed around the tornado, with damages to trees on the ground reported.

On 22 May 2015, a Conair Group float-equipped Air Tractor AT-802 fighting a fire near Cold Lake, Alberta encountered a fire whirl. The encounter resulted in a loss of control and collision with terrain, killing the pilot on board. A fire whirl, of reportedly uncommon size for New Zealand wildfires, formed on day three of the 2017 Port Hills fires in Christchurch. Pilots estimated the fire column to be 100 m (330 ft) high.

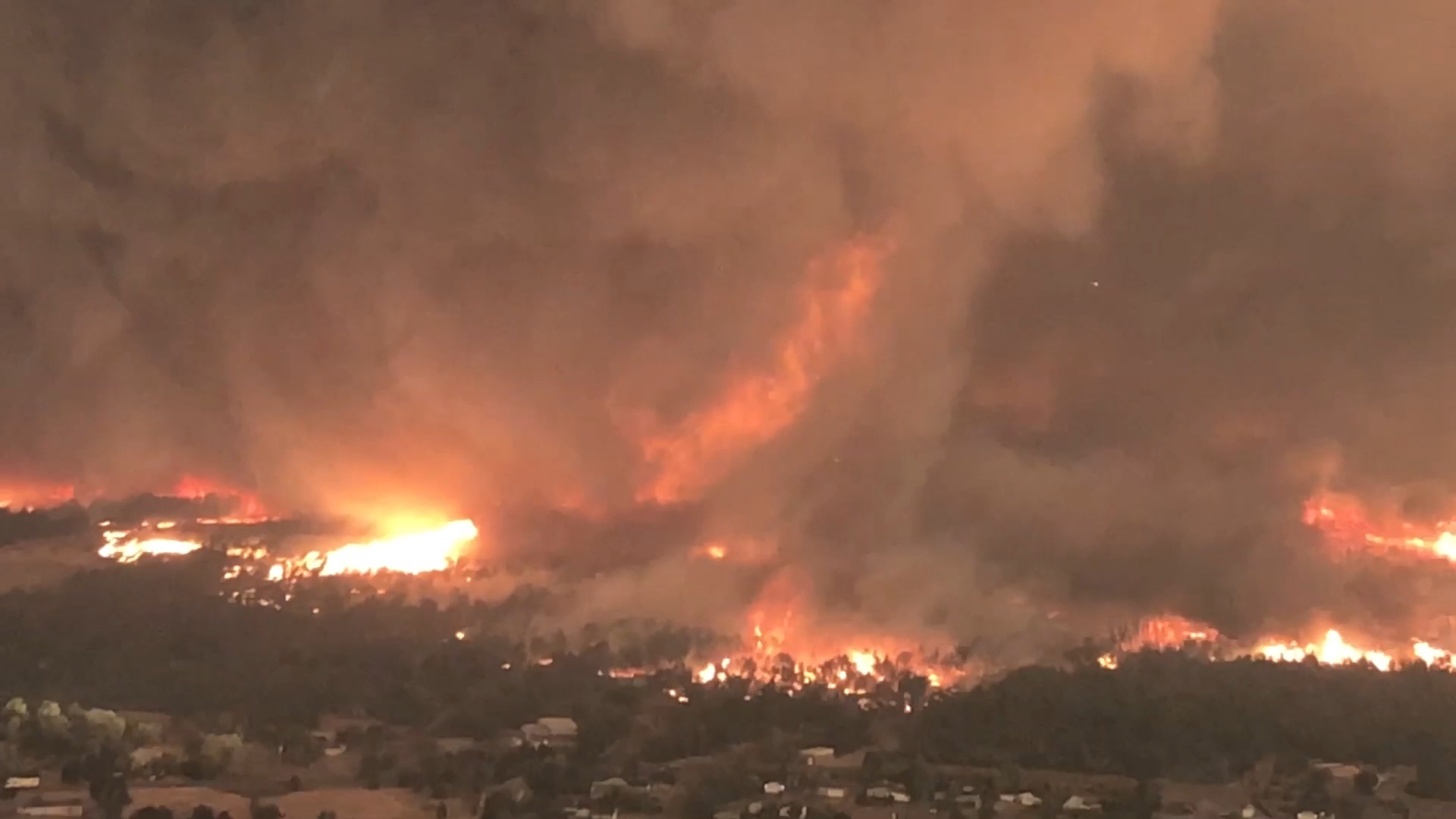
The 2018 Carr Fire tornado at around peak intensity

On 26 July 2018, a massive fire tornado, later known as the 2018 Carr Fire tornado would hit the town of Redding, California, killing 4 and injuring 6 other. It would be the most powerful tornado to ever hit the state, receiving an EF3 rating from the National Weather Service, with maximum windspeed of 143mph (230km/h).

On 15 August 2020, for the first time in its history, the U.S National Weather Service issued a tornado warning for a pyrocumulonimbus created by a wildfire near Loyalton, California, capable of producing a fire tornado. 3 fire tornadoes were confirmed, two of which was rated EF1.

On 24 July 2024, during the Jasper wildfires near Jasper, Alberta, Canada, a large fire tornado was generated, burning and flattening large swaths of forest. Analysis of tree-fall damages by the Northern Tornado Project (NTP), along Natural Resources Canada (NRCan), suggested the tornado could have reached EF4-EF5 equivalent intensity on the Enhanced Fujita scale, with a near-100% tree breakage and debarking near the Wabasso Campground.

Throughout the Palisades wildfire, multiple fire whirls were reported and captured by helicopters.

On 12 July 2025, a strong and nearly stationary fire tornado was spawned from the Deer Creek wildfire in San Juan County, Utah. Despite being rated EF2 and damaging a fire engine belonging to the Bureau of Land Management, no injuries or fatalities would occur in relation to this fire tornado.

On 2 August 2026, a large and stationary fire tornado was captured on camera in Harney County, Oregon. No known casualties were reported.

== Blue whirl ==
In controlled small-scale experiments, fire whirls are found to transition to a mode of combustion called blue whirls. The name blue whirl was coined because the soot production is negligible, leading to the disappearance of the yellow color typical of a fire whirl. Blue whirls are partially premixed flames that reside elevated in the recirculation region of the vortex-breakdown bubble. The flame length and burning rate of a blue whirl are smaller than those of a fire whirl.

== See also ==
- Dust devil
- Steam devil
- Waterspout
