= Loyalton Fire =

2020 wildfire in California and Nevada

- Part of the August 2020 California lightning siege
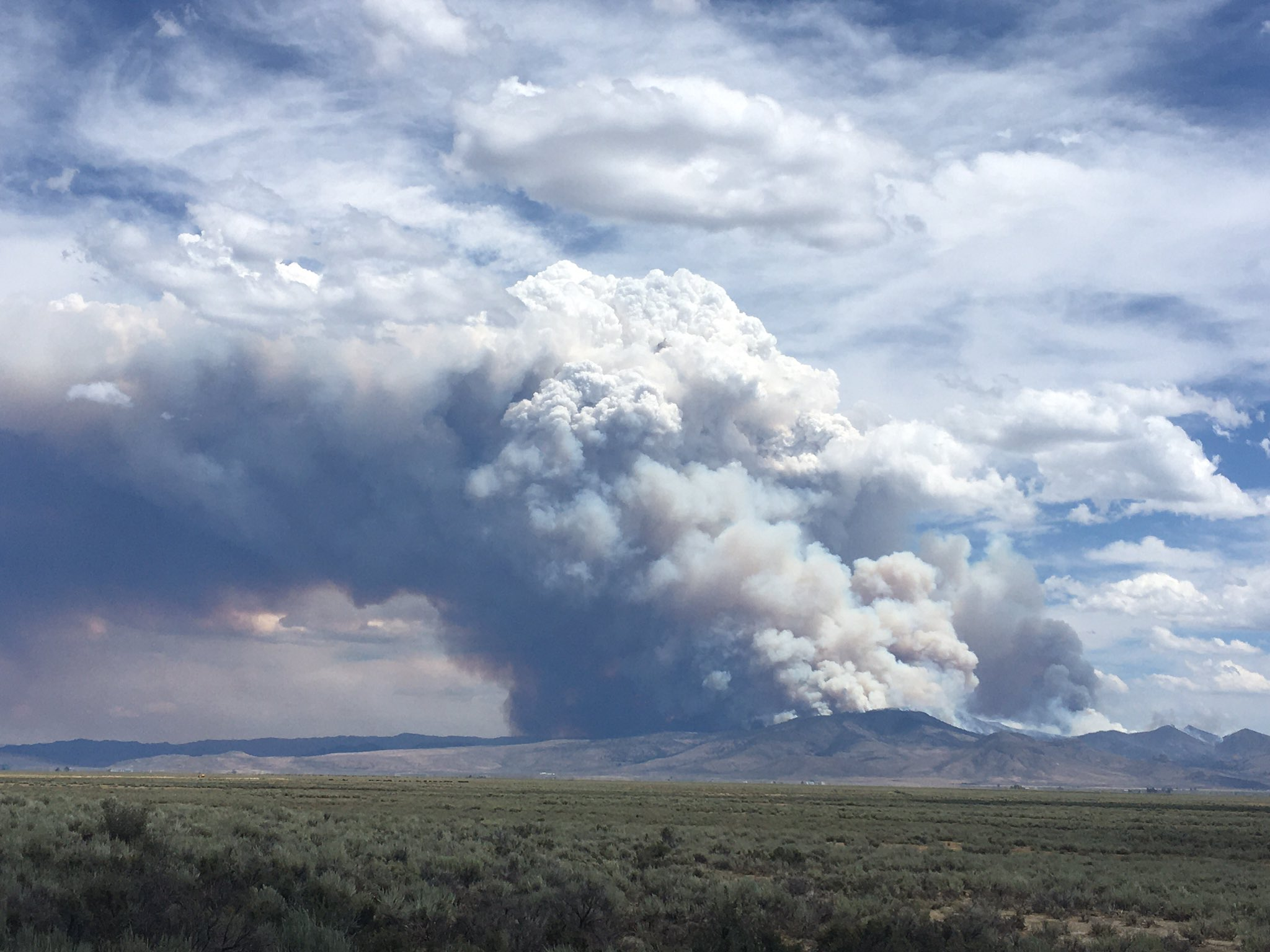
- The Loyalton Fire's smoke plume and pyrocumulus cloud on August 15, taken from the Plumas/Sierra county line near Calpine
- Date: August 14, 2020 –; August 26, 2020
- Location: Loyalton, California
- Coordinates: 39.681°N 120.171°W

Statistics
- Burned area: 47,029 acres (19,032 ha)

Impacts
- Structures destroyed: 35

Ignition
- Cause: Lightning

Map
- The fire's general location in Northern California and eastern Nevada

Location of Loyalton Fire

The 2020 Loyalton Fire was a large wildfire in Lassen, Plumas and Sierra counties in California and Washoe County in Nevada. After it was ignited by lightning on August 14, 2020, the fire burned 47,029 acres (19,032 ha) in the Tahoe National Forest and the Humboldt-Toiyabe National Forest before it was fully contained on August 26. The Loyalton Fire was notable for generating three fire tornadoes on August 15, necessitating first-of-their-kind warnings by the National Weather Service.

== Progression ==
The fire was started by lightning strikes east of Loyalton along the eastern edge of the Sierra Valley, near Mount Ina Coolbrith on the Tahoe National Forest. A fire lookout on Smith Peak in the Plumas National Forest first reported smoke from the burgeoning fire to the Plumas dispatch center in Quincy at 4:27 p.m. PDT on Friday, August 14. Limited road access prevented ground crews from getting near the fire for several hours. Despite the efforts of helicopters and air tankers, by 7:28 p.m. the fire had burned 500 acres (200 ha).

On August 15, at around 2:35 p.m. PDT, high winds and thunderstorm activity spawned three fire tornadoes, two of which were rated EF1. The National Weather Service issued its first-ever fire tornado warning resulting from the building pyrocumulonimbus cloud in response to the incident, which went into effect for Lassen County.

By the morning of August 16, the fire had expanded to 20,000 acres (8,100 ha). Evacuation orders were issued for areas in Lassen County south of SR 70 and west of US 395. SR 70 was closed between SR 49 and US 395 as fire crews worked to prevent the fire from spreading north of Beckwourth Pass. The fire briefly jumped north of SR 70 and east of US 395 but was quickly stopped in those directions. By the evening of August 16, helped by strong winds, the fire had burned 29,828 acres (12,071 ha). Evacuation orders were expanded to Balls Canyon Road, Long Valley Road, Bordertown, Copperfield, and Cold Springs as the fire spread east into Nevada and the Humboldt-Toiyabe National Forest. About 580 firefighters, 42 engines and 6 aircraft were on the scene.

Crews had made progress on the southeast flank of the fire on August 17, mandatory evacuations were lifted for Cold Springs, and SR 70 was reopened. The Dog Valley and Long Valley areas of the Carson Ranger District on the Humboldt-Toiyabe National Forest were closed to recreational access. By evening, advisory evacuation orders were in place for Loyalton, Chilcoot, Vinton, and Sierra Brooks. Lightning strikes started several new fires to the south around 7:30 pm, but rain after midnight helped slow fire activity. As of August 17, five homes and six other structures had been destroyed.

On August 18, the fire had been largely contained in the north and east, and mandatory evacuations were lifted in Lassen County. However, it continued spreading rapidly to the south and west, largely due to the lightning strikes there the previous day. The fire grew to 43,444 acres (17,581 ha) and was 10 percent contained.

High winds continued throughout August 19, but crews had managed to slow the fire spread considerably. Evacuation advisories were lifted for Cold Springs and Bordertown. By the evening, evacuation advisories were also lifted for Chilcoot, Vinton and Loyalton, although evacuation orders remained in place for Balls Canyon Road, Long Valley Road, and Copperfield, and an evacuation advisory for Sierra Brooks.

On the morning of August 20, evacuation advisories were lifted for Sierra Brooks and Copperfield. As of 5:44 pm on August 20, the fire had burned 46,582 acres (18,851 ha) and was 60 percent contained. Air quality continued to be extremely poor in Sierra Valley and Reno, with visibility highly impaired by smoke.

On the morning of August 21, evacuation orders remained in place for Balls Canyon Road and Long Valley Road. The fire had burned 46,872 acres (18,968 ha) and remained at 60 percent containment.

At 6:30 am on August 22, the fire was at 47,029 acres (19,032 ha) and was 75 percent contained. Wind activity decreased significantly over the weekend helping fire crews to expand containment. A total of six homes and 29 other structures were reported destroyed. All evacuation orders were lifted as of this time, though the Dog Valley area of the Humboldt-Toiyabe National Forest remained closed.

The fire was declared 100 percent contained on August 26. It burned 47,029 acres (19,032 ha) in total.

== Effects ==
The Loyalton Fire destroyed 35 structures. No other buildings were damaged. The toll included six homes and 29 outbuildings, most of which were abandoned and lay near the north end of the fire.
