= INSPYRE =

NASA airborne science investigation

INjected Smoke and PYRocumulonimbus Experiment (INSPYRE) is a NASA airborne science investigation led by the United States Naval Research Laboratory (NRL) to study pyrocumulonimbus (pyroCb) storms and their relationship to extreme wildfire behaviour. The investigation examines the processes by which intense wildfires generate pyroCb storms, inject smoke into the upper atmosphere and, in some cases, the stratosphere, and affect atmospheric composition and Earth's radiative balance.

INSPYRE is led by research meteorologist David Peterson of the U.S. Naval Research Laboratory, with scientific leadership also involving Neil Lareau of the University of Nevada, Reno and Olga Kalashnikova of NASA's Jet Propulsion Laboratory. NRL coordinates a science team of more than 100 scientists from federal agencies, universities and research organizations. Partner organizations include NASA, the National Oceanic and Atmospheric Administration, the National Science Foundation, the National Center for Atmospheric Research, and the University of Nevada, Reno.

== Objectives ==
The principal objective of INSPYRE is to constrain the role of pyrocumulonimbus storms in the Earth system and characterize their physical links to extreme wildfire behaviour. The investigation tests the hypothesis that increasing wildfire size and intensity will amplify pyroCb-driven smoke injection into the stratosphere and produce measurable changes to Earth's radiative balance.

The investigation seeks to improve understanding of several processes associated with pyroCb storms, including the conditions under which wildfires generate them, the mechanisms controlling the vertical injection of smoke, and the subsequent transport and evolution of smoke in the upper troposphere and stratosphere.

PyroCb storms can produce powerful updrafts that transport smoke and combustion products to high altitudes. When smoke reaches the stratosphere, it can remain there for extended periods and be transported over large distances, potentially affecting atmospheric chemistry and the Earth's radiation budget.

== Aircraft and observations ==
INSPYRE combines measurements from aircraft, ground-based instruments, satellites and atmospheric models. NASA's Lockheed ER-2 high-altitude research aircraft is used to make observations from above wildfire plumes and pyroCb storms. The ER-2 can operate at altitudes of approximately 21 km (70,000 ft), allowing its instruments to observe the atmosphere above most of the Earth's atmosphere.

A second aircraft, the Gulfstream V operated by the National Center for Atmospheric Research and the National Science Foundation, is used for in-situ sampling within and around pyroCb smoke plumes. Ground teams deploy mobile radar and lidar systems near active wildfires to observe fire behaviour and the development of pyroconvective clouds.

The investigation also includes instruments designed to examine lightning and other atmospheric processes associated with pyroCb storms. The U.S. Naval Research Laboratory contributes the iSTORM instrument, which detects gamma ray emissions associated with terrestrial lightning events.

== Field campaigns ==
INSPYRE is planned as a multi-year field investigation, with major airborne deployments in 2026 and 2027. The 2026 deployment uses NASA's ER-2 aircraft based in Great Falls, Montana, while the NSF/NCAR Gulfstream V operates from Boulder, Colorado. The aircraft and ground teams coordinate observations of suitable wildfire and pyroCb events across the western United States and parts of Canada.

The first science flights began in summer 2026. NASA's INSPYRE operations schedule includes aircraft deployment, forecasting meetings and coordinated flight planning between the aircraft and ground-based science teams.

The 2026 campaign is intended to collect observations covering a range of fire and atmospheric conditions, from intense wildfire smoke plumes to fully developed pyrocumulonimbus storms. The observations are intended to improve understanding of the processes controlling pyroCb formation and smoke injection and to provide data for improving atmospheric and wildfire models.

== Background ==
INSPYRE developed from previous research by the U.S. Naval Research Laboratory and other institutions into pyrocumulonimbus storms and wildfire smoke. Before the establishment of INSPYRE, NRL researchers developed a database of pyroCb events and investigated the relationship between extreme wildfire behaviour and smoke injection into the upper atmosphere.

In 2024, NASA selected the investigation as one of six airborne science missions funded through its Earth Venture program. The mission was allocated approximately US$30 million for research over five years.

The project was originally described in NASA's Earth Venture Suborbital-4 (EVS-4) proposal process as a large airborne field investigation into the role of pyroCb activity in the climate system and its physical connections with extreme wildfire behaviour.

== Scientific significance ==
Pyrocumulonimbus storms represent an unusual interaction between wildfire behaviour and atmospheric convection. Extreme fire-generated heat can produce strong updrafts that create thunderstorms, which can in turn alter fire behaviour through strong and erratic winds and lightning. The resulting storms can transport large quantities of smoke high into the atmosphere.

Smoke injected into the upper troposphere and stratosphere can travel thousands of kilometres from its source and may persist for days to months depending on altitude and atmospheric conditions. Understanding the mechanisms controlling this injection is therefore relevant to atmospheric chemistry, weather and climate modelling, aviation, wildfire behaviour and air-quality forecasting.

INSPYRE is intended to provide observations that can be used to improve numerical models and forecasting of pyroCb development and smoke transport. The project also seeks to address gaps in existing atmospheric forecast models, which do not fully represent the injection of wildfire smoke into the upper atmosphere by pyrocumulonimbus storms.

== See also ==
- Pyrocumulonimbus
- Cumulonimbus flammagenitus
- Wildfire
- Atmospheric convection
