= Cumulonimbus flammagenitus =

Thunderstorm cloud that forms above a heat source

Cumulonimbus Flammagenitus
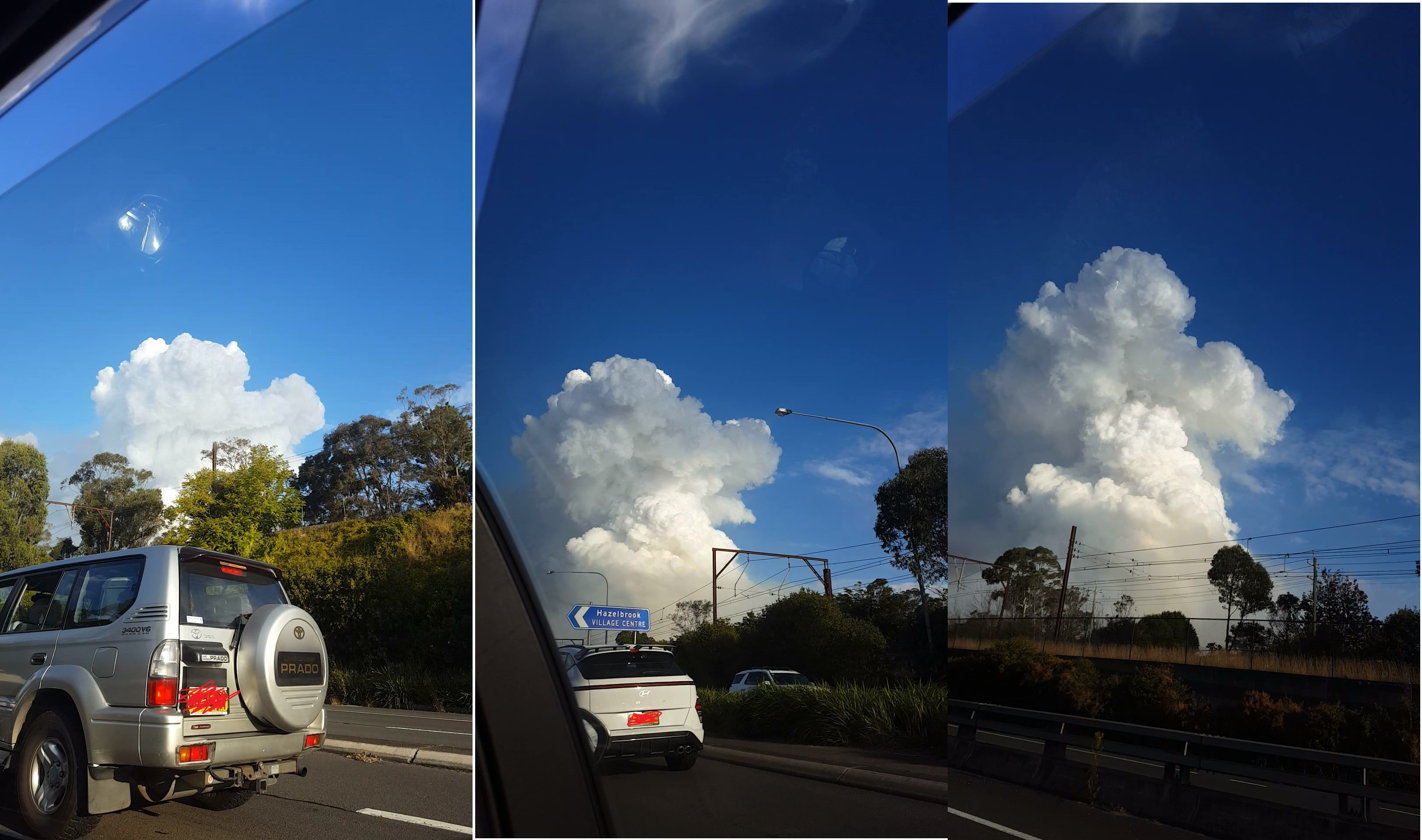
- A three-image progression of a Pyrocumulonimbus cloud, caused by backburning, forming over the Blue Mountains and viewed from Hazelbrook, New South Wales.
- Abbreviation: CbFg or PyroCb
- Genus: Cumulonimbus
- Species: none
- Altitude: 500–16,000 m (2,000–52,000 ft)
- Appearance: Fast-growing storm cloud that usually has dark ash rising rapidly.
- Precipitation: Rain, hail or occasional acid rain.

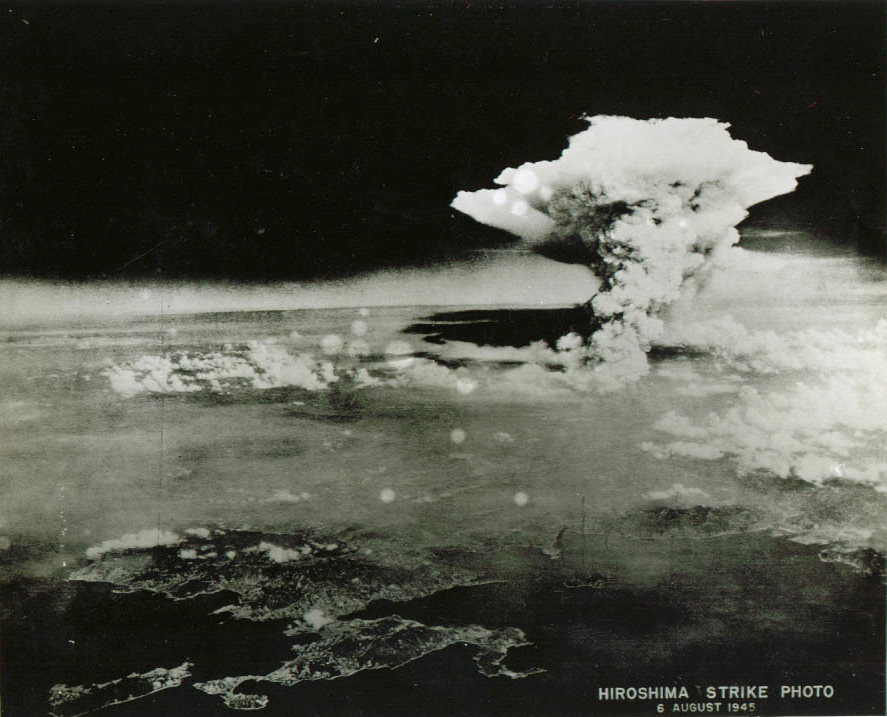
For decades, the plume in this "Hiroshima strike" photo was misidentified as the mushroom cloud (itself a type of cumulonimbus flammagenitus) from the atomic bomb blast on 6 August 1945. However, due to its much greater height, the cloud was identified in March 2016 as the cumulonimbus flammagenitus cloud produced above the city by the subsequent firestorm, which reached its peak intensity some three hours after the explosion.

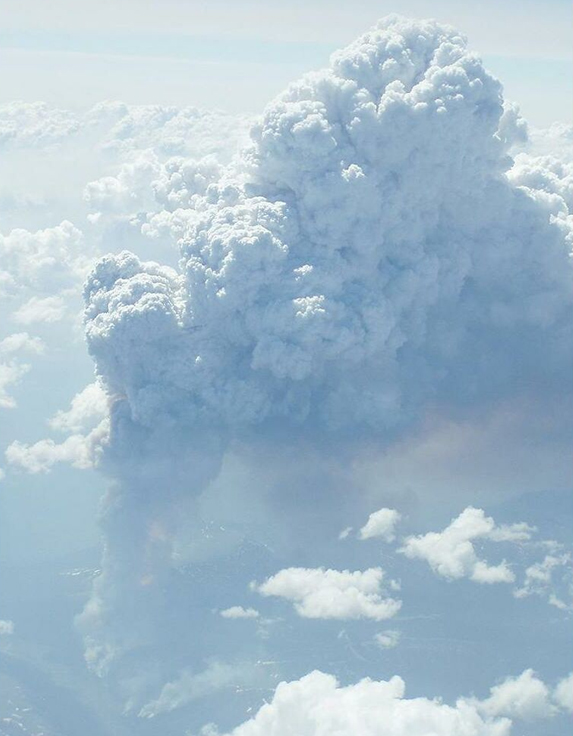
Picture of a cumulonimbus flammagenitus cloud, taken from a commercial airliner cruising at about 10 km (6.2 mi) altitude.

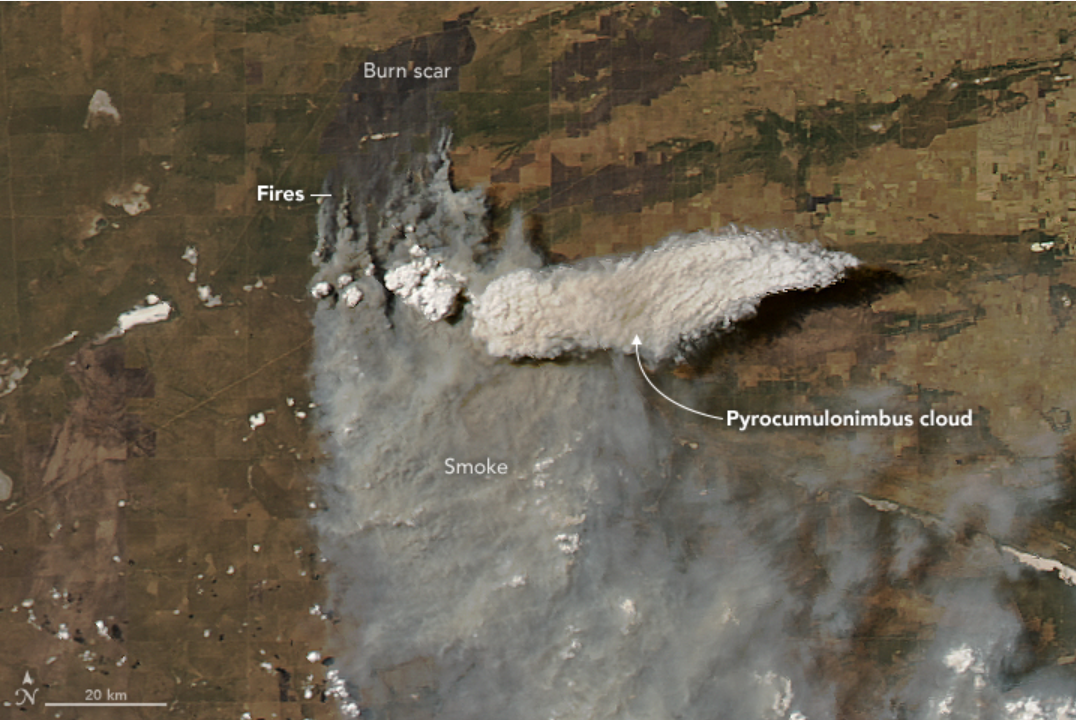
A satellite image of the formation of a cumulonimbus flammagenitus over Argentina in 2018.

The cumulonimbus flammagenitus cloud (CbFg), also known as the pyrocumulonimbus cloud (PyroCb), is a type of cumulonimbus cloud that forms above a source of heat, such as a wildfire, nuclear explosion, or volcanic eruption, and may sometimes even extinguish the fire that formed it. It is the most extreme manifestation of a flammagenitus cloud. According to the American Meteorological Society’s Glossary of Meteorology, a flammagenitus is "a cumulus cloud formed by a rising thermal from a fire, or enhanced by buoyant plume emissions from an industrial combustion process."

Analogous to the meteorological distinction between cumulus and cumulonimbus, the CbFg is a fire-aided or caused convective cloud, like a flammagenitus, but with considerable vertical development. The CbFg reaches the upper troposphere or even lower stratosphere and may involve precipitation (although usually light), hail, lightning, extreme low-level winds, and in some cases even tornadoes. The combined effects of these phenomena can cause greatly increased fire-spread and cause direct dangers on the ground in addition to 'normal' fires.

The CbFg was first recorded in relation to fire following the discovery in 1998 that extreme manifestations of this pyroconvection caused direct injection of large abundances of smoke from a firestorm into the lower stratosphere. The aerosol of smoke comprising CbFg clouds can persist for weeks, and with that, reduce ground level sunlight in the same manner as the “nuclear winter" effect.

In 2002, various sensing instruments detected 17 distinct CbFg in North America alone.

On August 8, 2019, an aircraft was flown through a pyrocumulonimbus cloud near Spokane, Washington, to better study and understand the composition of the smoke particles as well as get a better look at what causes these clouds to form, plus see what kinds of effects it has on the environment and air quality. It was one of the most detailed flights through CbFg to date.

In 2021 alone, an estimated 83 cumulonimbus flammagenitus had formed.

== Alternative names and World Meteorological Organization terminology ==
Alternate spellings and abbreviations for cumulonimbus flammagenitus that may be found in the literature include Cb-Fg, pyrocumulonimbus, pyro-cumulonimbus, pyroCb, pyro-Cb, pyrocb, and volcanic cb, having developed amongst different specialist groups In the media and in public communications, fire-driven examples are often referred to as fires 'making their own weather'.

The World Meteorological Organization does not recognize the CbFg as a distinct cloud type, but instead classifies it simply as the cumulonimbus form of the flammagenitus cloud, and uses Latin as the root language for cloud names ('pyro' is of Greek origin). This was formalised in the 2017 update to the WMO International Cloud Atlas, which states that any Cumulonimbus that is clearly observed to have originated as a consequence of localised natural heat sources will be classified by any appropriate species, variety and supplementary feature, followed by flammagenitus.

== Notable events ==
=== 1945 Hiroshima firestorm, Japan ===
On 6 August 1945, an intense cumulonimbus-like cloud was photographed above Hiroshima, long after the cloud generated by the atomic bomb had dissipated. The cloud was a result of the firestorm that had by then engulfed the city. Some 70,000–80,000 people, around 30% of the population of Hiroshima at the time, were killed by the blast and resultant firestorm.

=== 1991 Pinatubo 'volcanic thunderstorms', Philippines ===
Volcanic eruption plumes are not generally treated as CbFg, although they are convectively driven to a large extent and for weaker eruptions may be significantly enhanced in height in convectively unstable environments. However, for some months after the climactic eruption of Mt Pinatubo in the Philippines in 1991, meteorological observers from the US military observed what they termed 'volcanic thunderstorms' forming near the summit: cumulus cloud complexes formed near the top of the buoyant ash plume, and frequently developed into cumulonimbus clouds (thunderstorms).

The thunderstorms often drifted away from their source region at the top of the plume, producing sometimes significant amounts of localized rainfall, "mudfall," and ash fall. They also noted that thunderstorms formed over hot flows and secondary explosions even in the absence of any eruption. Further investigations confirmed that the volcano had clearly enhanced the convective environment, causing thunderstorms to form on average earlier in the day and more reliably than in surrounding areas, and that the presence of volcanic ash in cloud tops in the upper troposphere could be inferred from satellite imagery in at least one case.

=== 2003 Canberra firestorm, Australia ===
On 18 January 2003, a series of CbFg clouds formed as the result of a large wildfire during the 2003 Canberra bushfires in Canberra, Australia. They generated a large fire tornado, rated F3 on the Fujita scale: the first confirmed violent fire tornado. The tornado and associated fire killed four people and injured 492.

=== 2009 Black Saturday, Australia ===
On 7 February 2009, the Black Saturday bushfires killed 173 people, destroyed over 2000 homes, burnt more than 450,000 ha (1,100,000 acres), and resulted in losses of over four billion Australian dollars in Victoria, Australia. Multiple fire plumes produced a number of distinct CbFg, some of which reached heights of 15 km (9.3 mi) on that day and generated a large amount of lightning.

=== 2019 Black Summer, Australia ===
On 30 December 2019, two fire response vehicles were overturned by what was described as a 'fire tornado' originating from an active cumulonimbus flammagenitus cloud near Jingellic, New South Wales, Australia, on a day when multiple CbFg were recorded in the neighbouring State of Victoria to an altitude of at least 16 km (9.9 mi). One of these vehicles was variously described as weighing between 8 and 12 tonnes. The incident resulted in one fatality and injuries to two others.

=== 2020 Creek fire, United States ===
Animation of the formation of a pyrocumulonimbus above the 2020 Creek Fire in California

On 4 September 2020, the Creek Fire began in the Big Creek drainage area between Shaver Lake and Huntington Lake, California. By 8 September 2020, the fire was among the 20 largest wildfires ever seen in California, with an area of 152,833 acres (61,849 ha) burnt and 0% containment. The rapidly growing wildfire, aided by hot, windy, and dry weather, drought, and beetle-killed timber, created a pyrocumulonimbus cloud. According to NASA, it is the largest such cloud ever seen in the United States.

=== 2021 British Columbia firestorm, Canada ===
Widespread cumulonimbus flammagenitus appeared over British Columbia and northwestern Alberta in connection with the 2021 British Columbia wildfires, many of which were exacerbated by the historic 2021 Western North America heat wave. In just 15 hours, between 3pm June 30 and 6am July 1, 710,117 lightning strikes were recorded, of which 112,803 were cloud-to-ground strokes.

This activity followed several days of unprecedented temperature highs in late June, including Canada's highest-ever recorded temperature of 49.6 °C (121.3 °F) in Lytton, British Columbia (also known as Camchin or ƛ'q'əmcín). At least 19 wildfires ignited between June 27 and 29, but most remained under 5 hectares (12 acres); one fire, however, grew to at least 2 km^{2} (0.77 mi^{2}) by June 29, prompting evacuations. On June 30, two large fires spread out of control, one near Kamloops Lake which grew to 200 km^{2} (77 mi^{2}) by evening, and the other north of Lillooet, which similarly grew to tens of square kilometres that day. at least two residents were unable to escape due to the speed of the firestorm's advance and perished when a utility pole was blown down on them by flames.

=== 2021 Bootleg Fire, United States ===
During the Bootleg Fire in Oregon in July 2021, the fire had created pyrocumulus clouds almost daily, with some reaching as high as 30,000 feet (9,100 m); the fire also caused a pyrocumulonimbus cloud to form nearly 45,000 feet (14,000 m) high, bringing lightning and rain.

=== 2022 Hunga Tonga eruption ===
The eruption of the Hunga Tonga created a 36-mile-high (58 km) Cumulonimbus flammagenitus cloud with vigorous lightning activity.

=== 2026 France wildfires ===
In late July 2026, wildfires in south-west France began to generate their own weather, with pyrocumulonimbus clouds creating lightning which started additional fires. It was the first time that phenomenon been observed in France.

=== 2026 Pear Lake Fire, Canada ===
The Pear Lake wildfire in British Columbia produced intense fire behaviour and pyrocumulonimbus conditions during July 2026. The fire, located east of Pear Lake in the southern Interior, was reported as burning out of control by July 18 and subsequently expanded rapidly, eventually merging with the nearby Fiftynine Creek wildfire. Evacuation orders were issued for communities and properties in the surrounding area, including Downing Provincial Park.

The fire occurred during the INSPYRE (INjected Smoke and PYRocumulonimbus Experiment) research campaign, a NASA investigation of smoke and pyrocumulonimbus clouds generated by wildfires. NASA operated high-altitude research aircraft over western North America, including British Columbia, to study the atmospheric effects of these fire-generated thunderstorms. The campaign included observations of major British Columbia wildfires, including the Pear Lake fire.

== See also ==
- Atmospheric convection
- Flammagenitus
- Heat dome
- Fire tornado
