= Flammagenitus cloud =

Cloud that forms from large fires or explosions

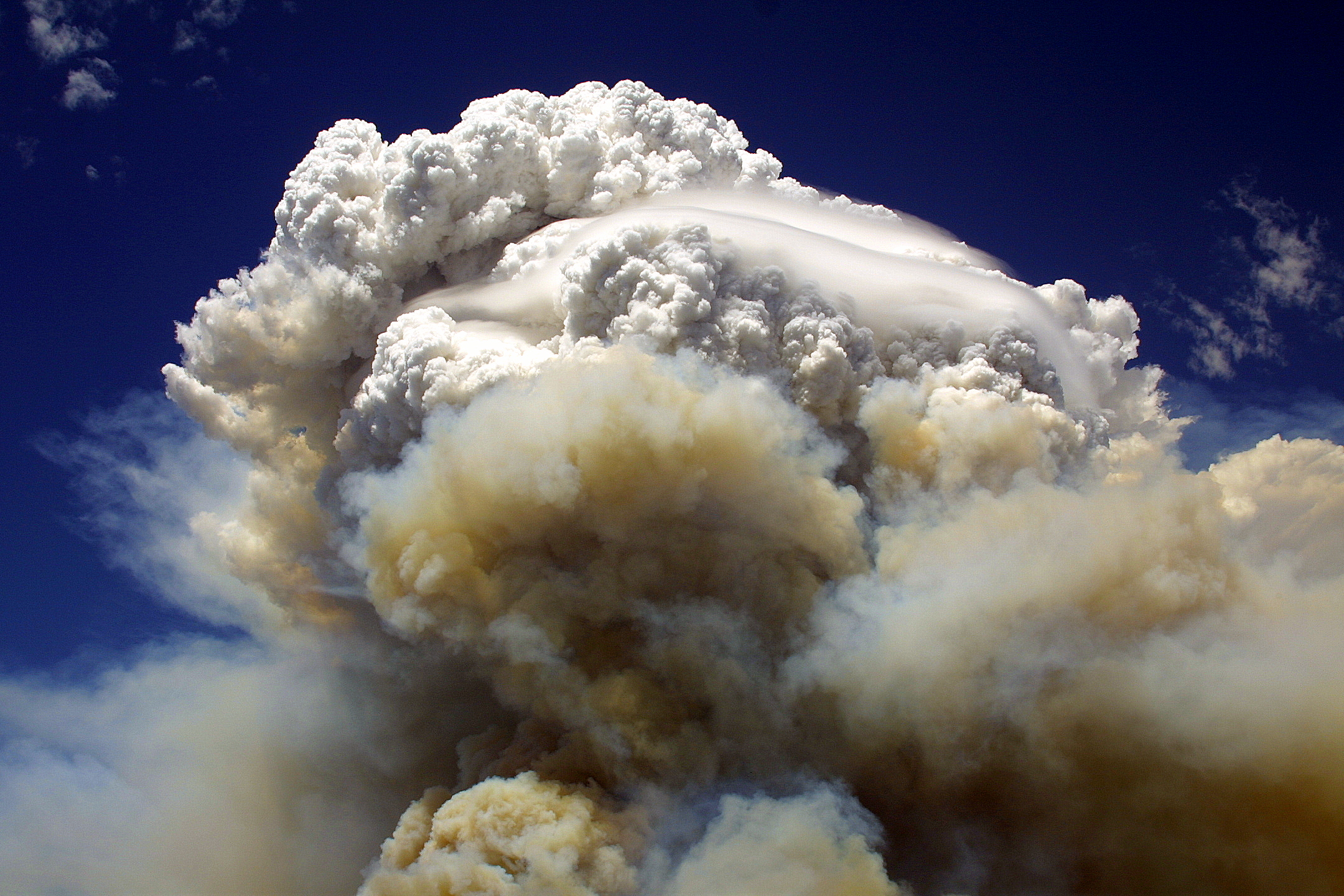
The 2004 Willow Fire burning near Payson, Arizona, producing a flammagenitus cloud.

A flammagenitus cloud, also known as a flammagenitus, pyrocumulus cloud, or fire cloud, is a dense cumuliform cloud associated with fire or volcanic eruptions. A flammagenitus is similar dynamically in some ways to a firestorm, and the two phenomena may occur in conjunction with each other. However, either may occur without the other.

== Formation ==
Firestorm schematic: (1) fire, (2) updraft, (3) strong gusty winds, (A) pyrocumulonimbus cloud

A flammagenitus cloud is produced by the intense heating of the air from the surface. The intense heat induces convection, which causes the air mass to rise to a point of stability, usually in the presence of moisture. Phenomena such as volcanic eruptions and forest fires can induce formation of this cloud, by mechanisms similar to those that form homogenitus clouds. The presence of a low-level jet stream can enhance its formation. Condensation of ambient moisture (moisture already present in the atmosphere), as well as moisture evaporated from burnt vegetation or volcanic outgassing (water vapour being a dominant component of volcanic eruptive gases), occurs readily on particles of ash.

Flammageniti contain severe turbulence, manifesting as strong gusts at the surface, which can exacerbate a large conflagration. A large flammagenitus, particularly one associated with a volcanic eruption, may also produce lightning. This is a process not yet fully understood, but is probably in some way associated with charge separation induced by severe turbulence, and, perhaps, by the nature of the particles of ash in the cloud. Large flammageniti can contain temperatures well below freezing, and the electrostatic properties of any ice that forms may also play a role. A flammagenitus that produces lightning is actually a type of cumulonimbus, a thundercloud, and is called cumulonimbus flammagenitus. The World Meteorological Organization formerly classified flammagenitus and cumulonimbus flammagenitus respectively as cumulus (mediocris or congestus) and cumulonimbus. In 2017, the WMO International Cloud Atlas chose flammagenitus as the formal name of these clouds.

== Appearance ==
Flammagenitus is often grayish to brown in color because of the ash and smoke associated with the fire. It also tends to expand because the ash involved in the cloud's formation increases the amount of condensation nuclei.

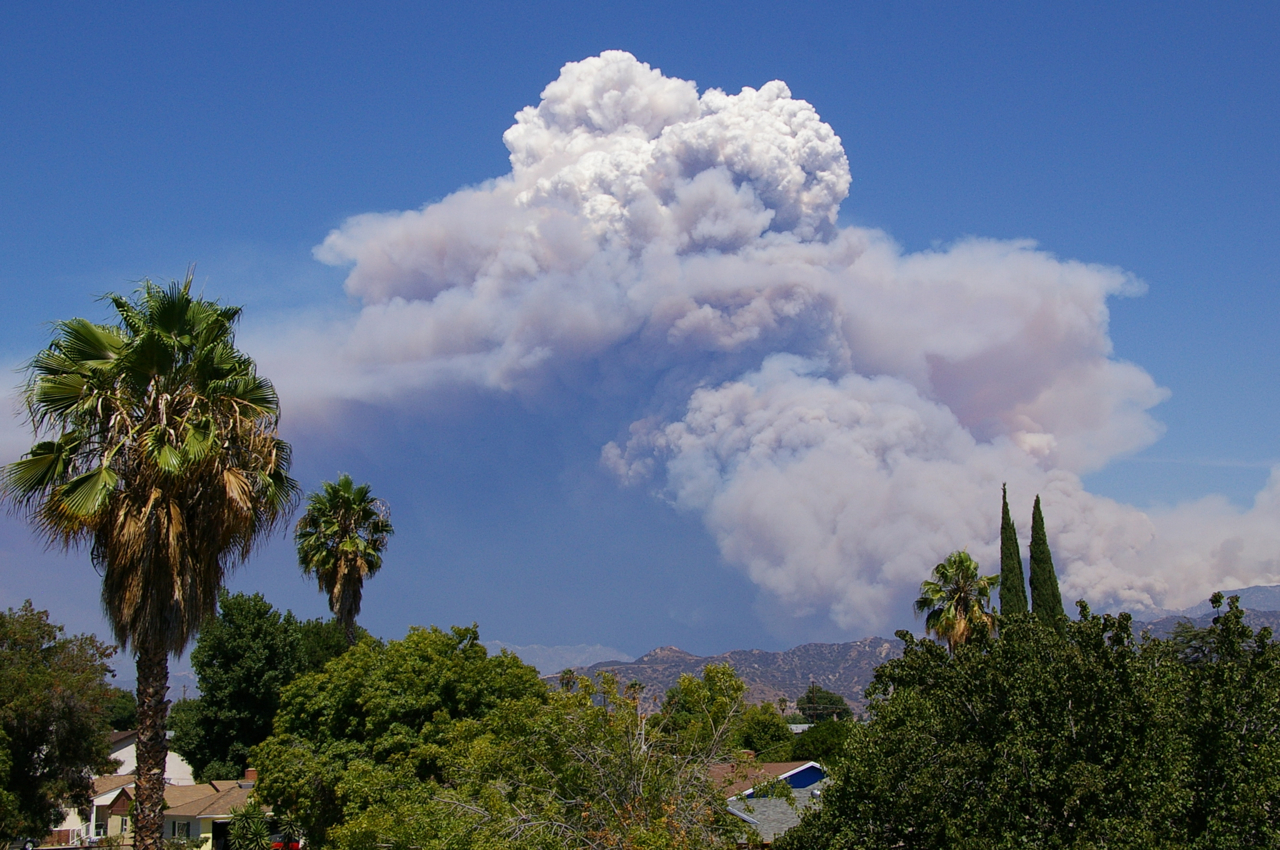
A flammagenitus cloud from the 2009 Station Fire in southern California

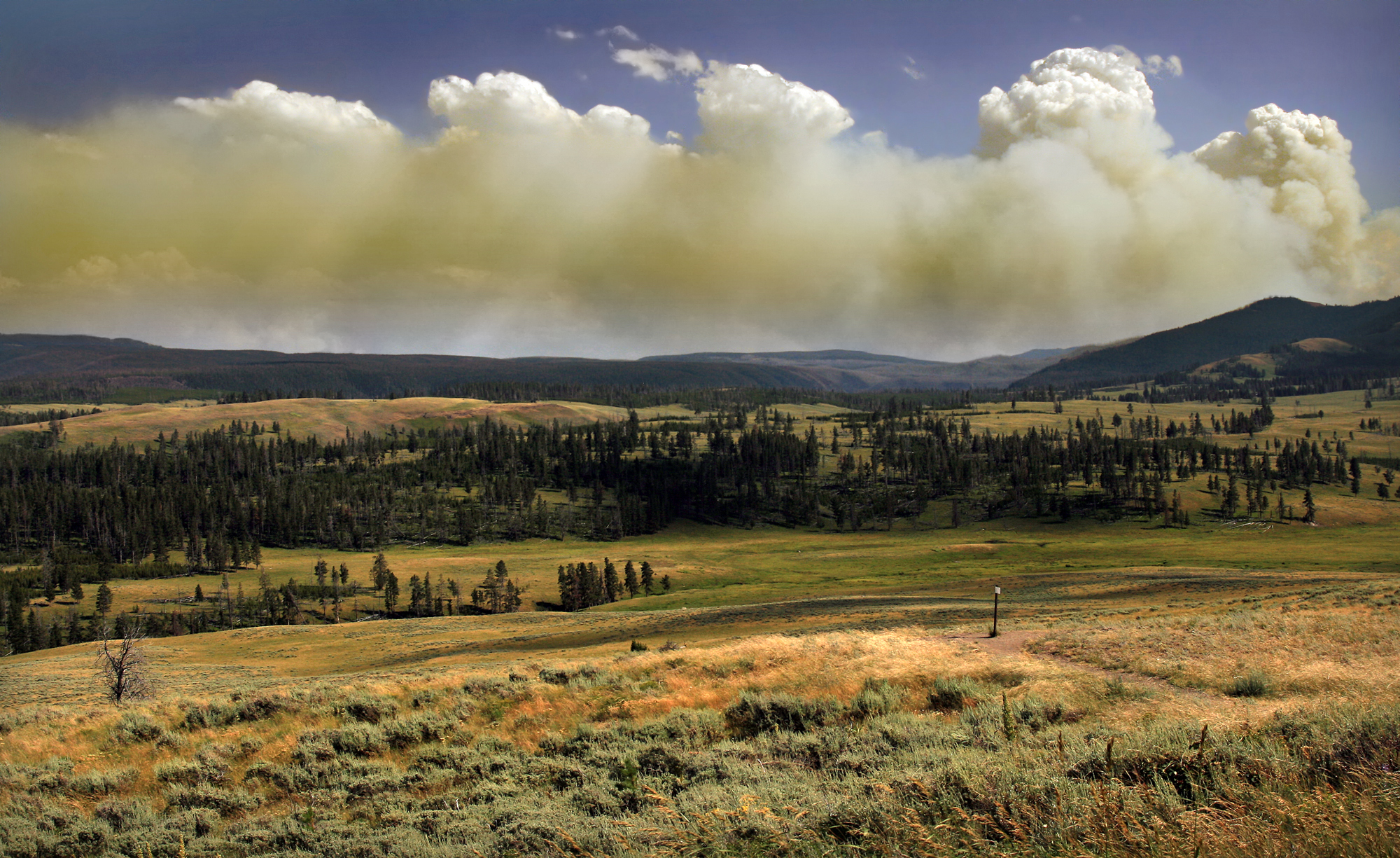
Wildfire in Yellowstone National Park produces pyrocumulus clouds.

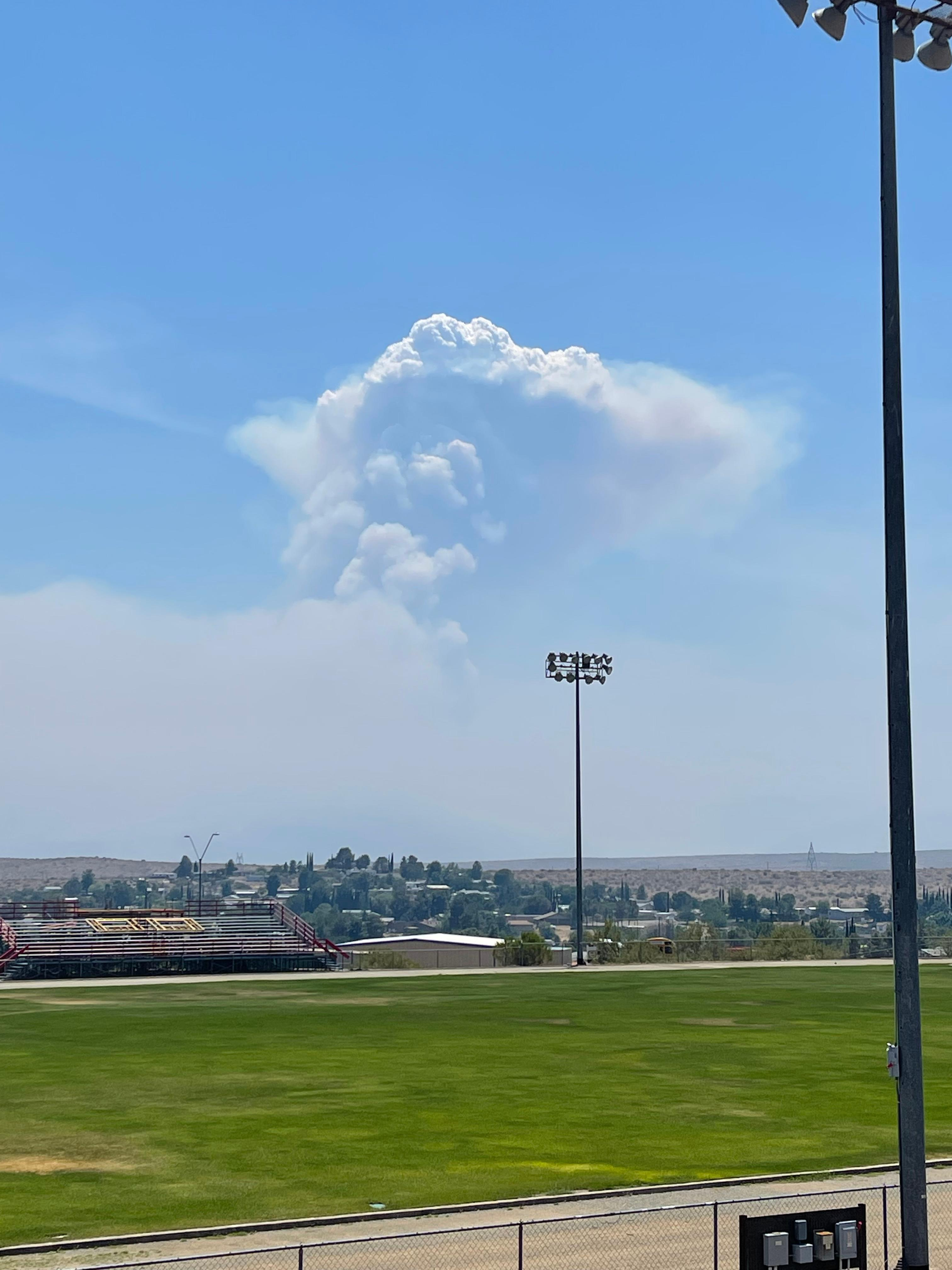
The 2021 Tiger Fire near Spring Valley, Arizona, producing a pyrocumulus cloud.

Flammagenitus clouds, born from a wildfire in Czech Republic in July 2022.

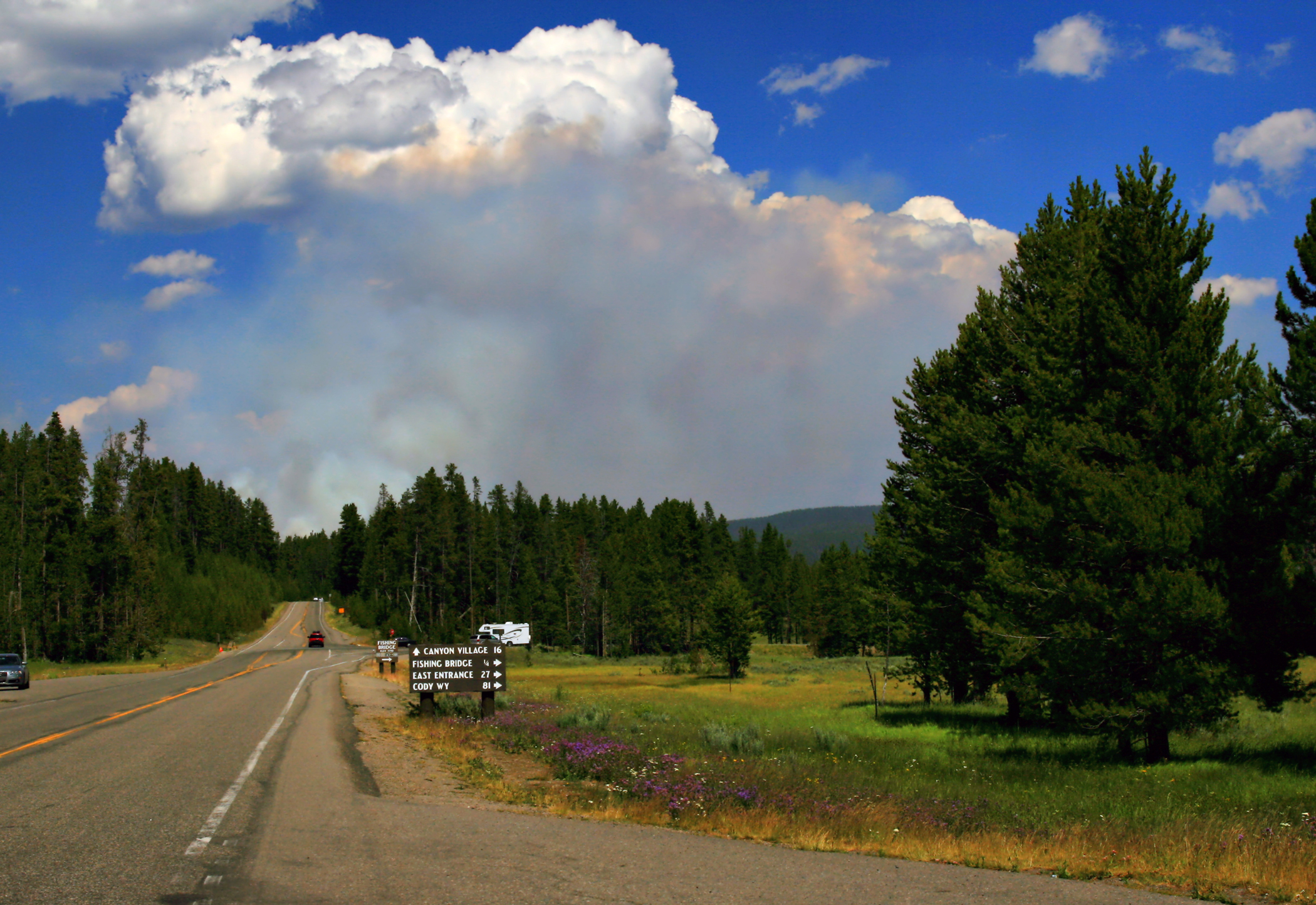
Wildfire in Yellowstone National Park produces a flammagenitus cloud.

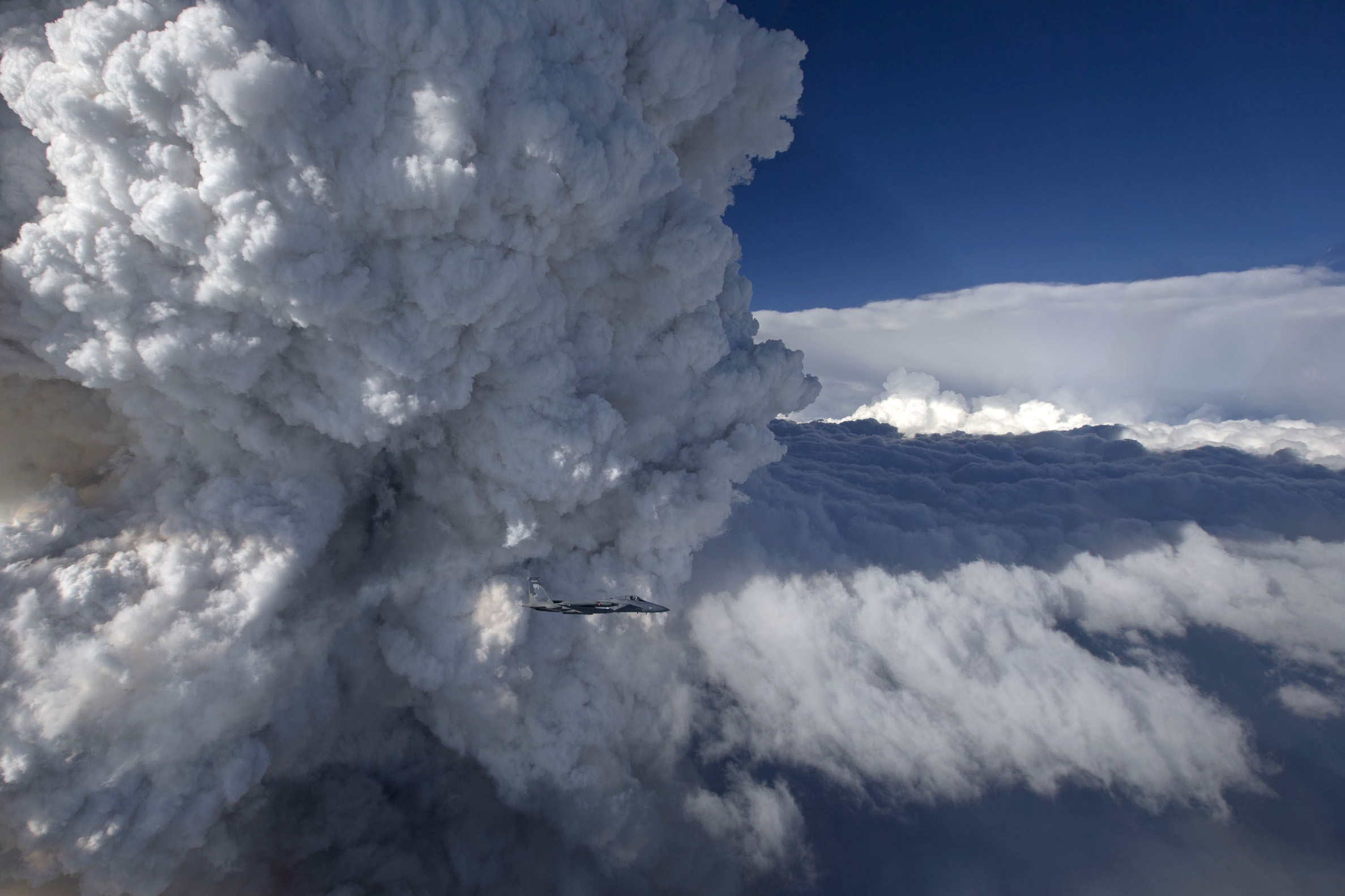
Flammagenitus cloud above the 2014 Oregon Gulch Fire in Oregon and California, 2014. Aircraft is an F-15C Eagle.

== Effects on wildfires ==
A flammagenitus cloud can help or hinder a fire. Sometimes, the moisture from the air condenses in the cloud and falls as rain, often extinguishing the fire. There have been numerous examples of a large firestorm being extinguished by the flammagenitus that it created. However, if the fire is large enough, the cloud may continue to grow, and become a type of cumulonimbus cloud known as a cumulonimbus flammagenitus, which may produce lightning and start another fire. Even if there is no lightning, a cloud of this type can cause a sudden increase in wind speed, which could dramatically worsen the wildfire that created the cloud.

== Hiroshima cloud ==
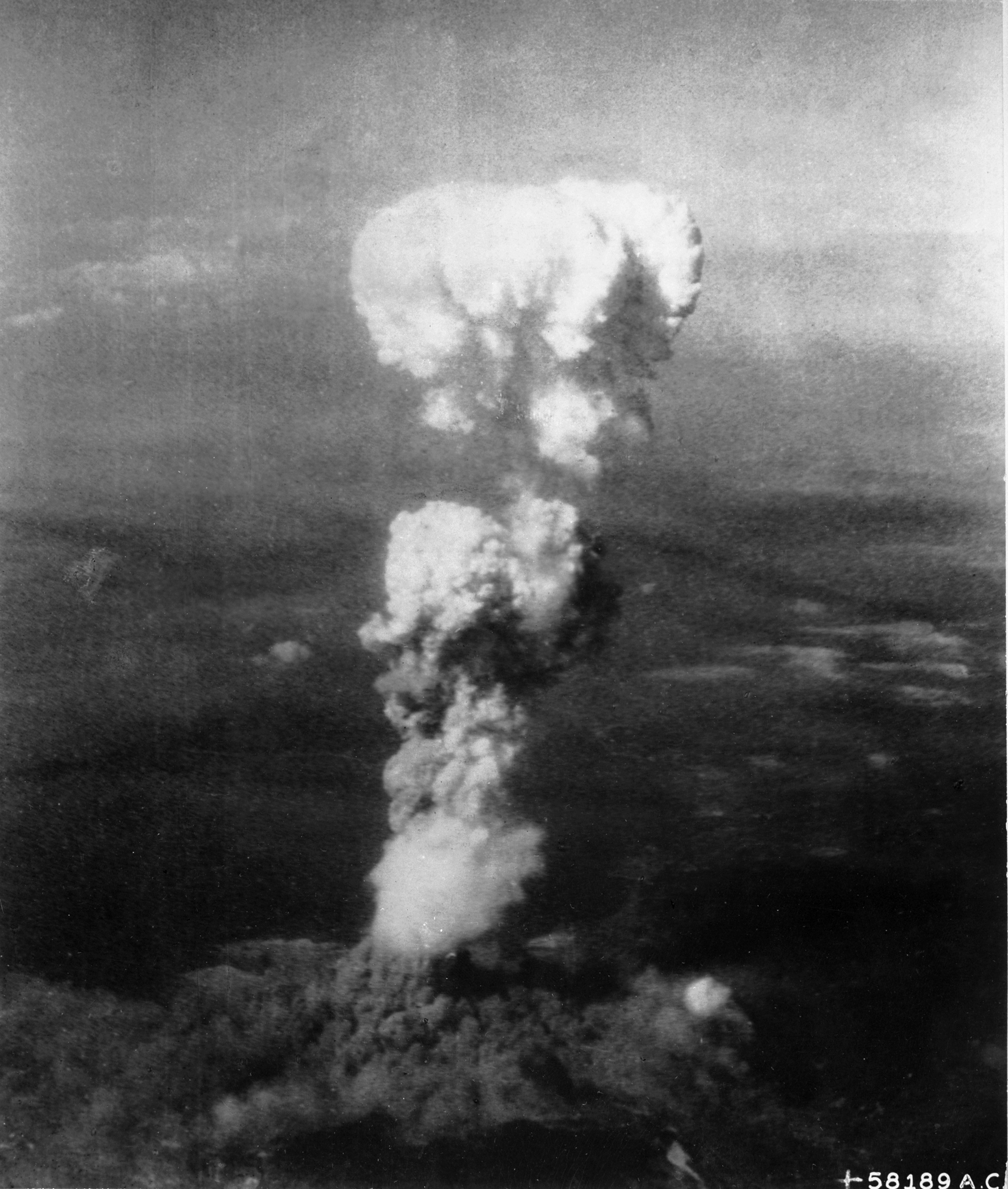
The (atomic) mushroom cloud over Hiroshima, immediately after detonation, as photographed by the tail-gunner of the Enola Gay.

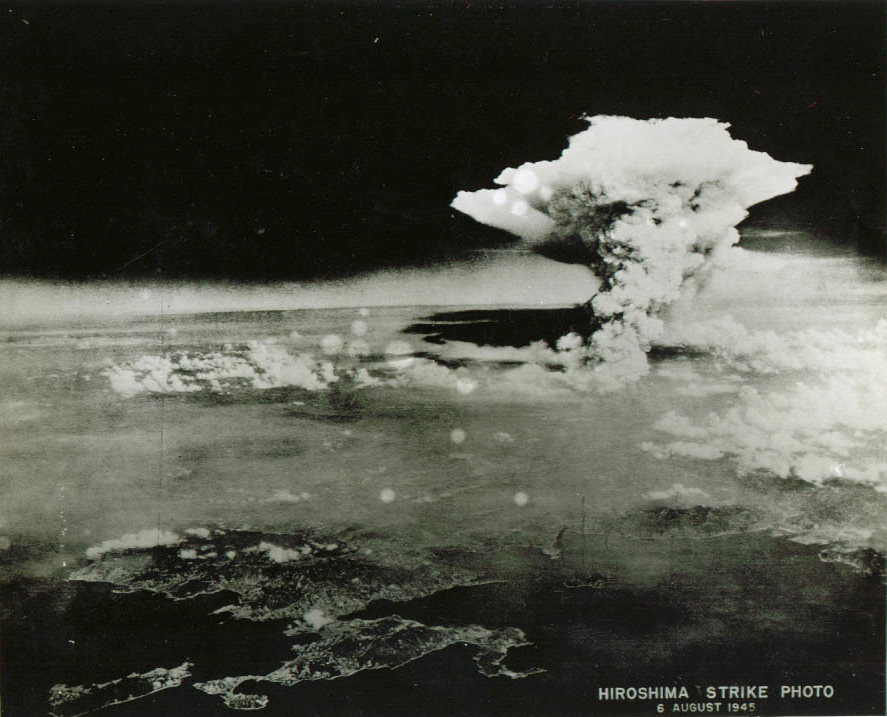
The much larger (firestorm) pyrocumulus cloud over Hiroshima, several hours later.

The atomic bombing of Hiroshima on August 6, 1945 produced an initial mushroom cloud that was formed by the nuclear fireball and its immediate effect on the atmosphere. Most photographs of the mushroom cloud at Hiroshima are of this cloud, which stabilized and began to disperse within 10-15 minutes.

The attack also initiated numerous primary and secondary fires which, over time, engulfed much of the city. Over time they merged into a firestorm, and generated a much more massive pyrocumulus cloud. Photographs taken by later US reconnaissance planes captured the massive cloud several hours after the initial attack. This later pyrocumulus cloud, caused by the secondary fires, is often mis-identified as the nuclear mushroom cloud, caused by the initial detonation.
