= Vinton, California =

Unincorporated community in California, United States

Vinton
- Unincorporated community
- Location in California Vinton (the United States)
- Coordinates: 39°48′16″N 120°10′42″W
- Country: United States
- State: California
- County: Plumas
- Elevation: 4,947 ft (1,508 m)
- ZIP code: 96135

Vinton is an unincorporated community in Plumas County, California, United States. It lies at an elevation of 4,947 feet (1,508 m). Vinton is located 2 miles (3.2 km) west of Chilcoot, at the junction of State Routes 49 and State Routes 70.

For census purposes, Vinton is included in the census-designated place (CDP) of Chilcoot-Vinton.

The Vinton post office opened in 1897. The name honors Vinton Bowen, daughter of a Sierra Valley Railway official. The Sierra Valley Railway later became part of the Western Pacific Railroad and now the Union Pacific Railroad.

The Sierra Valley Grange #466 organized in 1931. The grange has hosted many weddings, funerals, 4-H meetings, dinners and dances. In 1986 it became home to the Vinton Cowboy Poetry show, second show to Elko.

Vinton is in the Sierra-Plumas Joint Unified School District.
