= California State Route 284 =

State highway in Plumas County, California, United States

State Route 284
- SR 284 highlighted in red

Route information
- Maintained by Caltrans
- Length: 8.302 mi (13.361 km)

Major junctions
- South end: SR 70 at Chilcoot
- North end: Frenchman Lake

Location
- Country: United States
- State: California
- Counties: Plumas

Highway system
- State highways in California; Interstate; US; State; Scenic; History; Pre‑1964; Unconstructed; Deleted; Freeways
← SR 283	→ SR 285

State Route 284 (SR 284) is a state highway in the U.S. state of California that serves as a spur route off of State Route 70 in Chilcoot in Plumas County, connecting to Frenchman Lake.

== Route description ==
Route 284 is defined in section 584 of the California Streets and Highways Code, and that the highway is "from Route 70 at Chilcoot to Frenchman Reservoir".

SR 284 begins at State Route 70 at Chilcoot. It then continues north to its north end at the Frenchman Lake Dam at the Frenchman Lake Recreation Area.

SR 284 is not part of the National Highway System, a network of highways that are considered essential to the country's economy, defense, and mobility by the Federal Highway Administration.

== Major intersections ==
Except where prefixed with a letter, postmiles were measured on the road as it was in 1964, based on the alignment that existed at the time, and do not necessarily reflect current mileage. Postmile prefixes include: R reflecting a realignment in the route since then, M indicating a second realignment, L referring to an overlap due to a correction or change, and T indicating postmiles classified as temporary. Segments that remain unconstructed or have been relinquished to local control may be omitted. The entire route is in Plumas County.

Location	Postmile	Destinations	Notes
Chilcoot	0.00	SR 70	South end of SR 284; road continues as Patterson Street
Frenchman Lake Recreation Area	8.30	Frenchman Dam	North end of SR 284
Frenchman Lake Recreation Area	8.30	FH 11 (Frenchman Boulevard)	Continuation beyond Frenchman Dam through the recreation area
1.000 mi = 1.609 km; 1.000 km = 0.621 mi
