= Beckwourth Complex fires =

2021 wildfire in Northern California

Beckwourth Complex
- Part of the 2021 California wildfires
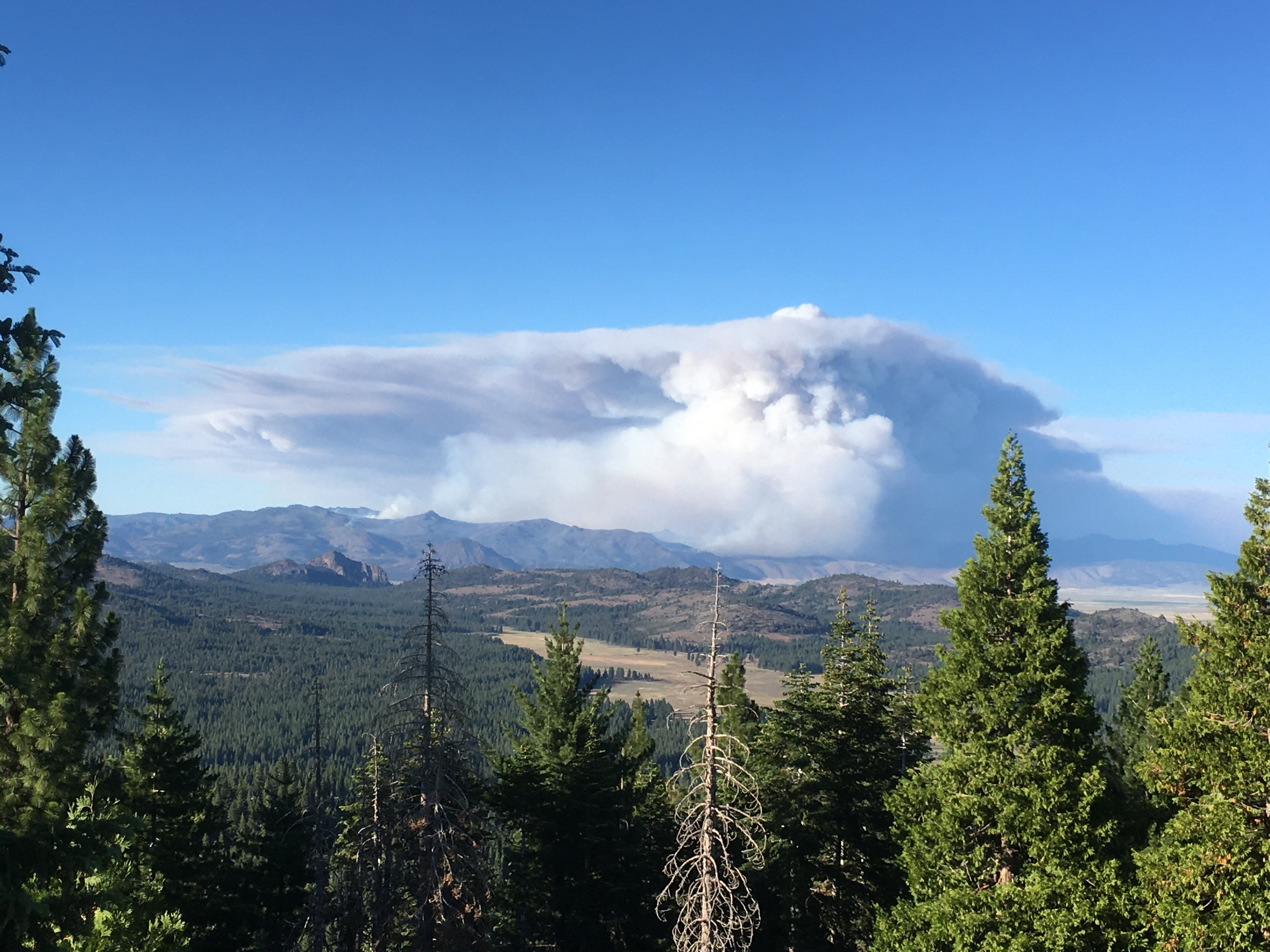
- The Beckwourth Complex fire burning on July 7, 2021
- Date: June 30, 2021 –; September 22, 2021
- Location: Beckwourth, California
- Coordinates: 39.875°N 120.368°W

Statistics
- Burned area: 105,670 acres 428 square kilometres

Impacts
- Structures destroyed: 148

Ignition
- Cause: Lightning

Map
- Location in Northern California

The Beckwourth Complex was a wildfire complex that burned in the Plumas National Forest in Plumas and Lassen counties. The two major fires of the complex, the Dotta Fire and the Sugar Fire, started on June 30, 2021 and July 2 northeast of Beckwourth, California. Started by lightning strikes, the two fires collectively burned 105,670 acres (42,763 ha). The complex resulted in the evacuation of numerous residential areas and the closure of portions of Plumas National Forest. In the community of Doyle, California, 33 homes were destroyed.

== Progression ==
=== July ===
The two major fires, the Dotta and Sugar, were ignited by lightning strikes on June 30 and July 2, respectively. the fires burned a combined 82,926 acres (33,559 ha) by July 11, 2021. Governor Gavin Newsom declared a state of emergency for the complex on July 17, 2021.

Dotta Fire

Burning on Horton Ridge, to the west of Dixie Mountain, the Dotta Fire started on June 30, 2021. It developed a smoke column which caused considerable fire activity, including a spot fire, on July 3. As a result, the area of Dixie Valley was put under an evacuation warning. By the morning of July 4, the fire had burned 670 acres (271 ha) and was 24 percent contained. The fire continued to smolder, with little to no growth. As a result, resources were moved from the Dotta to the Sugar Fire, which grew on July 6. Crews continued to focus on mop up. As of July 11, the fire was 99 percent contained. The Dotta Fire was 100 percent contained by July 22, 2021.

Sugar Fire

The Sugar Fire started on the southeast side of Sugarloaf Peak, three miles northeast of Beckwourth, California, near Nervino Airport, adjacent to the Plumas National Forest, on July 2. It was first reported at around 10:30 AM on July 3, 2021, Despite significant fire growth on July 3 due to dry conditions, cloud cover and humidity helped tamper fire activity on July 4, allowing crews to make containment progress. Twenty firefighters from Puerto Rico arrived to help fight the fires alongside California crews. Houses and outbuildings in the immediate area were threatened, with fire crews implementing structure protection on July 3. By the next morning, July 4, the Sugar Fire had burned 470 acres (190 ha) and was 15 percent contained. Evacuation warnings were put in place for the ranches along Maddalena Road. That warning was rescinded on July 5 due to the fire's lack of growth.

In the late afternoon of July 6, the Sugar Fire jumped containment lines, fueled by gusty winds. Burning northeasterly, it grew 1,875 acres (759 ha). As a result, mandatory evacuations were put in place for residents in portions of Beckwourth. Evacuation warnings were put back in place for Dixie Valley and extended to Frenchman Cove. An evacuation center opened in Portola, California. The next day, July 7, Frenchman Cove was placed under mandatory evacuation and Frenchman Lake was placed under an evacuation warning. Due to the fire's increasing behavior due to dry, hot and windy conditions, more mandatory evacuation orders were put in place for Dooley, Big Cove, Frenchman Cove, Frenchman Village and Frenchman Lake including all campgrounds and residences around the lake and Maddalena. The fire pushed towards Dixie Lookout in the north and began spotting around Frenchman Lake. The United States Forest Service closed forest access for the Beckwourth Complex area and shut down numerous roads that access the forest, including Highway 284, on July 9. That same day, residents in the Doyle Grade area in Lassen County were evacuated. The fire continued to expand towards the evacuated Doyle Grade area and eventually created a pyrocumulonimbus cloud, producing its own lightning. By the morning of July 10, the Sugar Fire had burned 16,365 acres (6,623 ha), moving further northeast. Additional evacuation centers were opened in Susanville, California and Reno, Nevada. That day, the fire reached Highway 395 and closures were put in place.

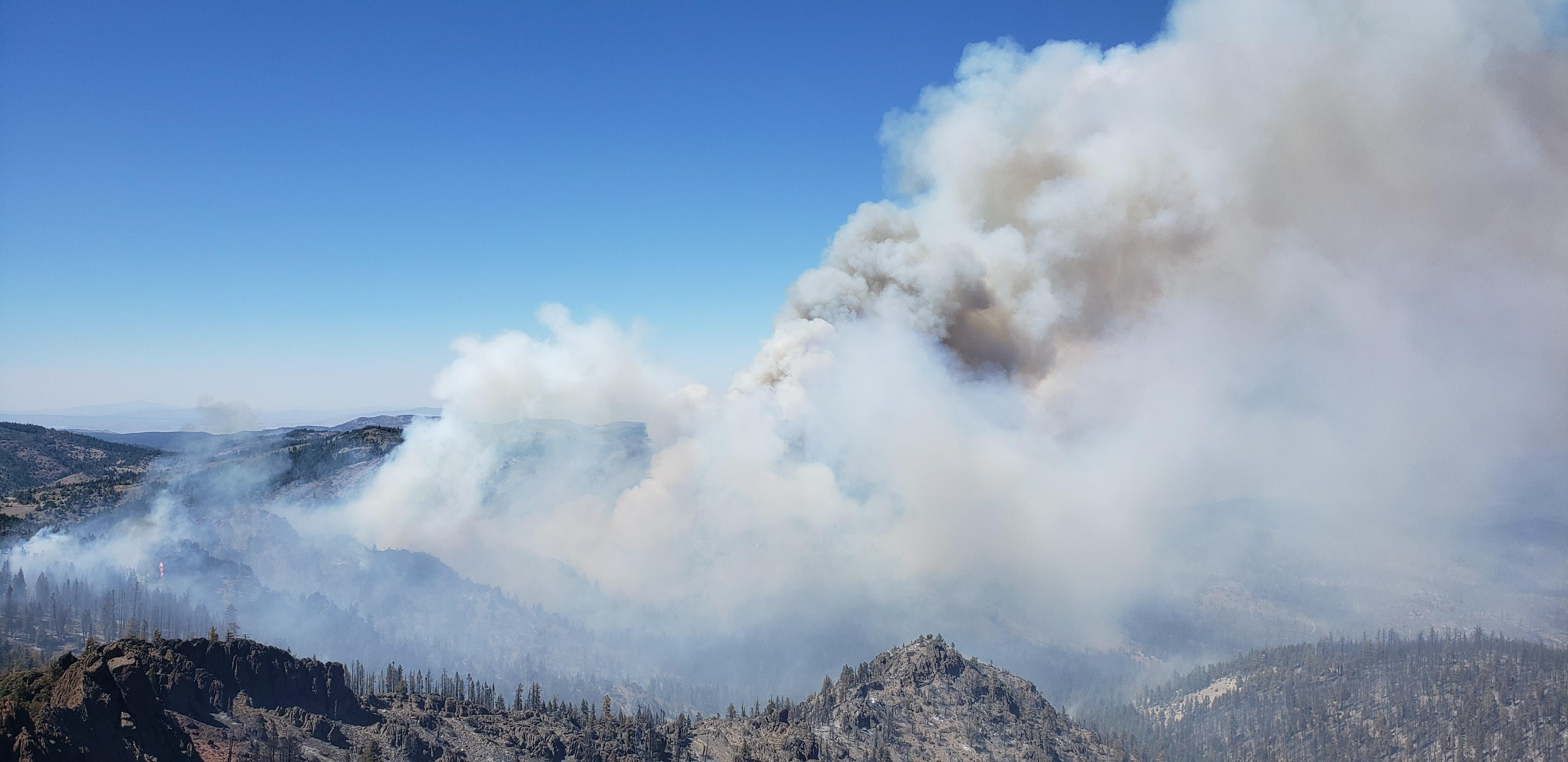
The Sugar Fire on July 15, 2021.

The Sugar Fire continued to grow, threatening communities in Washoe County, Nevada. This resulted in evacuations for Rancho Haven, Fish Springs, and Flanigan Flats. Another evacuation center was opened in Reno to accommodate. However, the fire did not cross the state line. By July 12, the fire was 23 percent contained on the south side of the fire. Highway 365 was reopened. Additional Lassen County evacuations took place. The Doyle Fire Protection District reported that an estimated 20 homes were destroyed by the fire. A few days later, on July 16, the fire encroached on Highway 395, leading to another brief closure. By the end of the week, it was reported that 33 homes were destroyed in the community of Doyle in Lassen County by the Sugar Fire.

The fire was 60 square miles in size by July 20 and was primarily contained within control lines. Evacuation orders were lifted for most parts of Lassen County. The next day, July 21, mandatory evacuations were lifted for all Plumas County areas.

=== August ===
On August 2, the fires were a combined 98 percent contained and burned 105,670 acres (42,763 ha). The Forest Service reduced the size of the closure of forest land to an area slightly larger than the fire burn scar. The closure remained in place until September 1, 2021.

=== September ===
On September 6, the Dixie Fire burned up to the fire's scar and prevented any further growth along the Dixie Fire's eastern portion. On September 22, the Beckwourth Complex was 100% contained.

== Effects ==
=== Evacuations ===
The complex led to the mandatory evacuations, starting July 6, of portions of Plumas County including Beckwourth, California, Frenchman Cove, Frenchman Village, Maddalena and all recreational and residential areas of Frenchman Lake. The Doyle Grade area, in Lassen County, was also evacuated starting July 9. The Sugar Fire also resulted in mandatory evacuations in Washoe County, Nevada for Fish Springs, Flanigan Flats and Rancho Haven.

To support relief efforts, the Portola Baptist Church in Portola, California, Lassen County Fairgrounds in Susanville, California, and Hug High School and the Reno-Sparks Livestock Events Center in Reno, Nevada, served as evacuation points.

=== Recreational activities ===
The fire also impacted recreational activities. The majority of the fire area was closed to the public, including trails, roads and points of interest, including Frenchman Lake, until September 1, 2021. The fire damaged some facilities at the lake and campground.

=== Infrastructure ===
The Sugar Fire destroyed 33 homes in Doyle, California, and 148 in total. 23 structures were damaged.

=== Environmental ===
The fires impacted air quality in the Reno, Nevada area starting July 7. Smoke from the fire cast an orange glow in the city in the morning and residents could smell smoke.

== Gallery ==
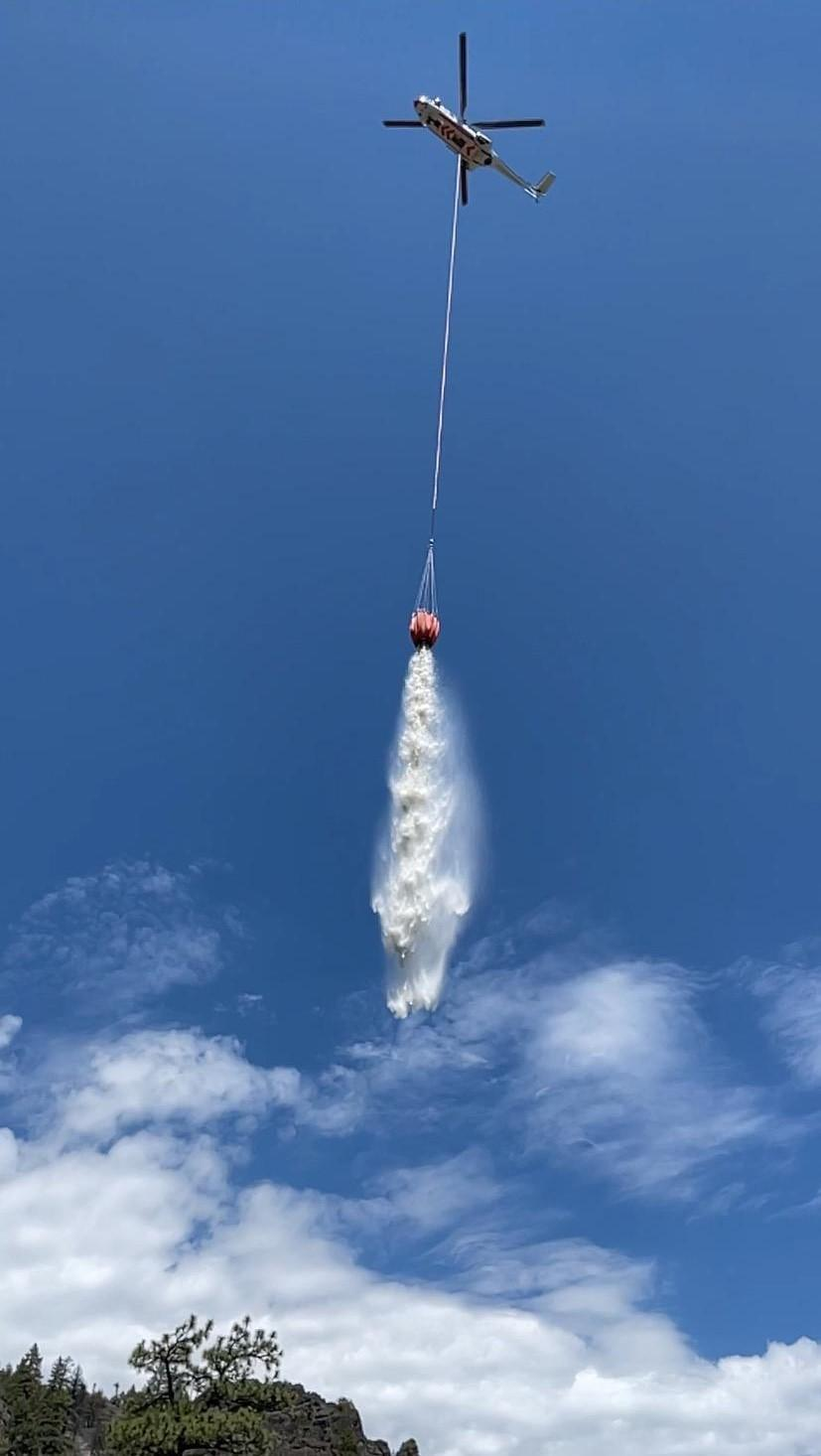
A helicopter drops water on the Complex on July 5, 2021.

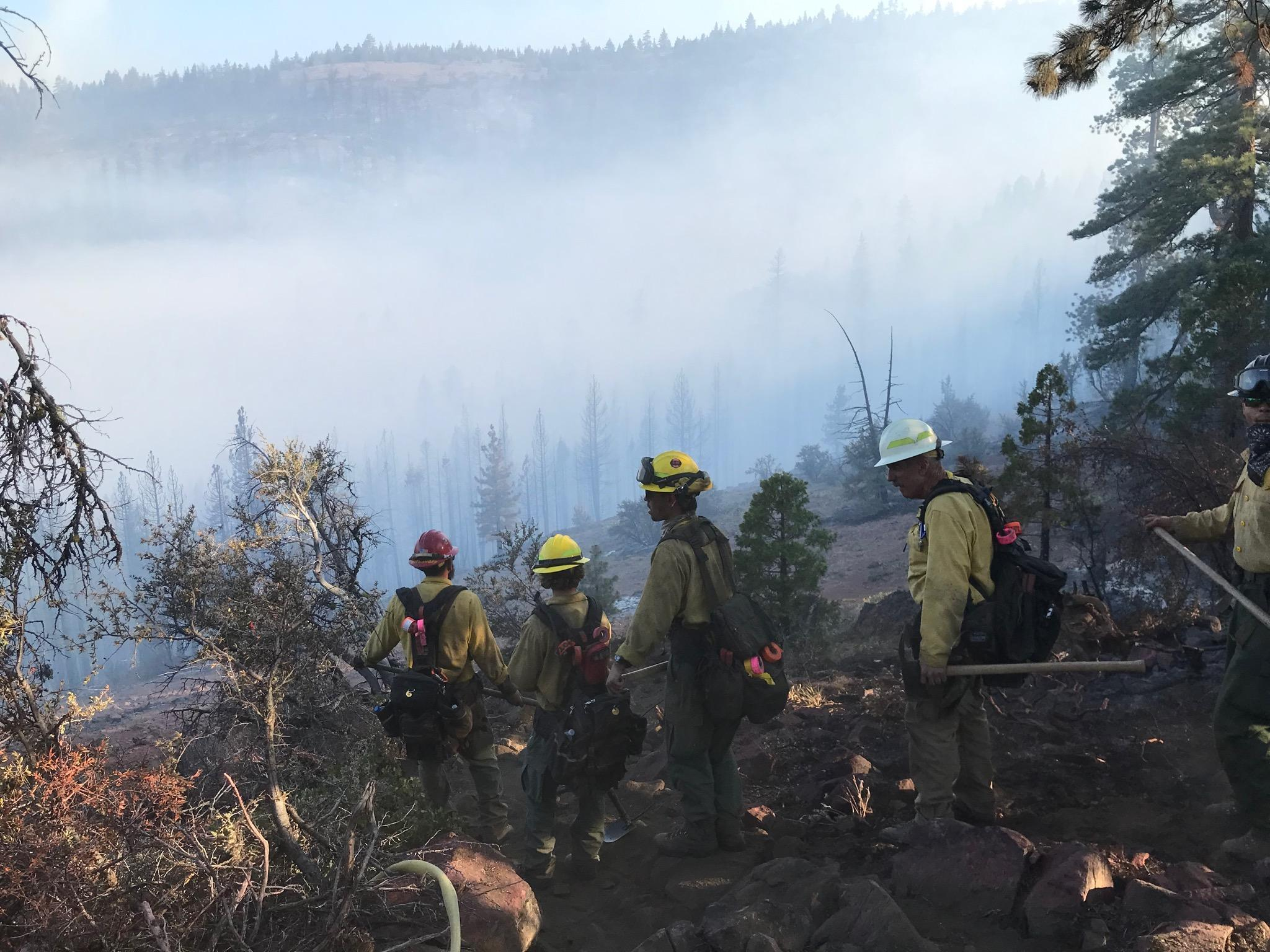
Crews working the line on July 5, 2021.

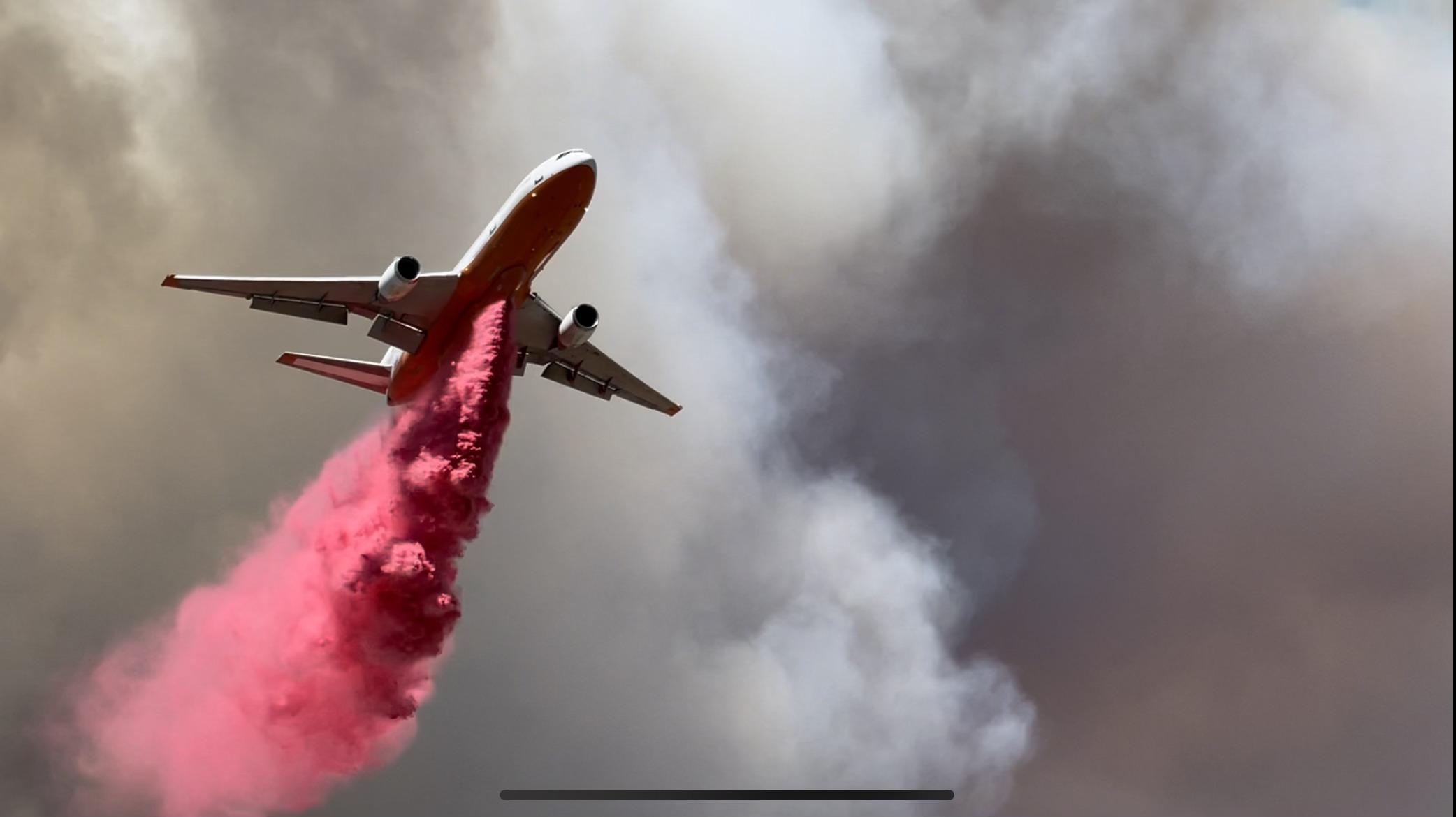
A VLAT supporting the fire fighting efforts on July 18, 2021.
