= Eagle Prairie =

Eagle Prairie may refer to:

- Eagle Prairie Bridge
- Eagle Prairie, former name of Rio Dell, California
