= Nervino Airport =

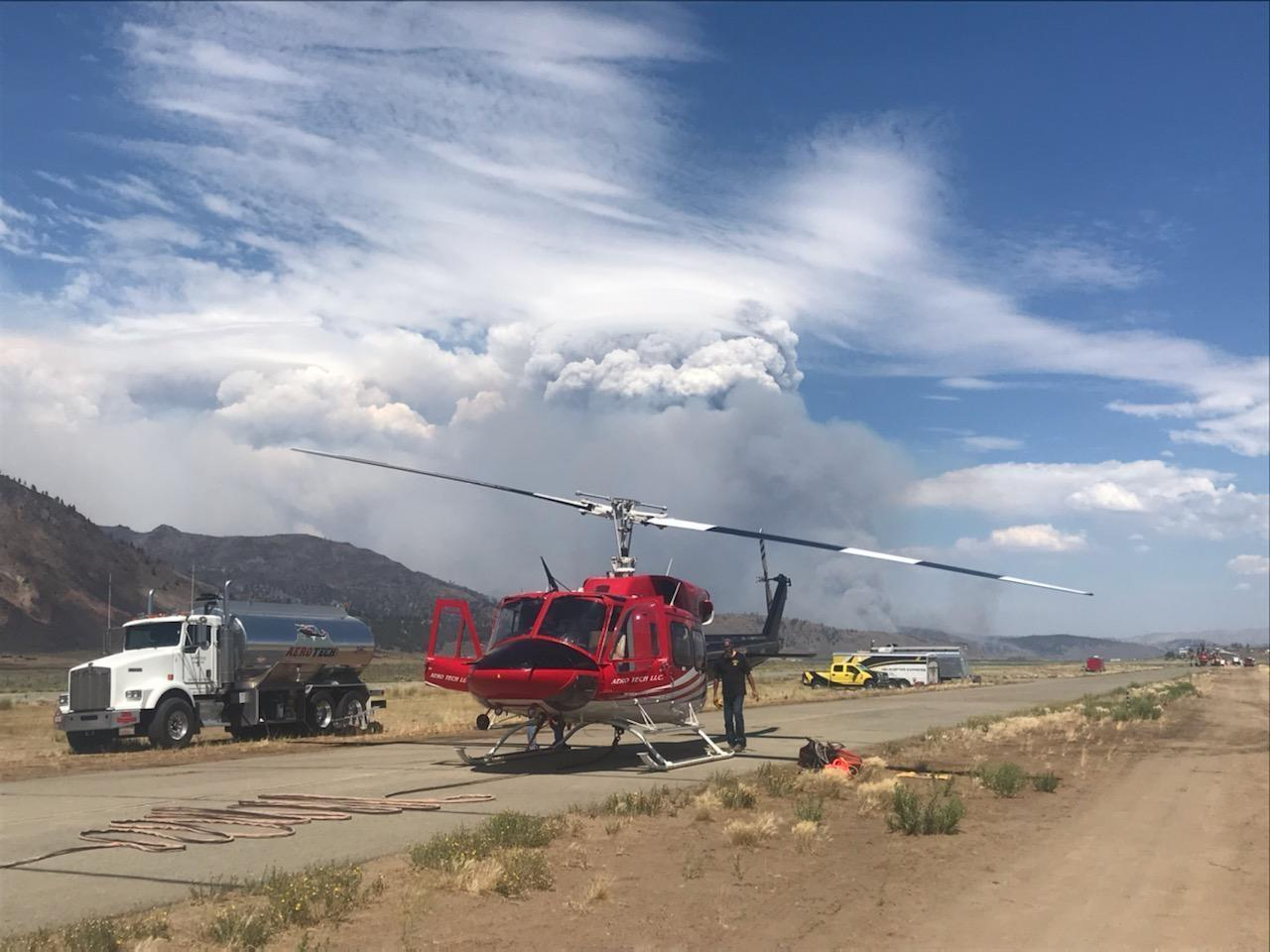
- A helicopter at Nervino Airport during the Beckwourth Complex Fire in 2021.
- IATA: NVN; ICAO: none; FAA LID: O02

Summary
- Airport type: Public
- Operator: Plumas County
- Location: Beckwourth, California
- Elevation AMSL: 4,900 ft / 1,493.5 m
- Coordinates: 39°49′07″N 120°21′10″W
- Website: www.plumascounty.us/163/Airports
- Interactive map of Nervino Airport

Runways
Direction	Length		Surface
Direction	ft	m	Surface
8/26	4,651	1,418	Asphalt

Nervino Airport (IATA: NVN, FAA LID: O02) is a public airport located one mile (1.6 km) east of Beckwourth, serving Plumas County, California, United States. The airport is mostly used for general aviation. It is used for the area's annual fly-in breakfast.

== Facilities ==
Nervino Airport covers 99 acres (400,000 m^{2}) and has one runway:

- Runway 8/26: 4,651 x 75 ft (1,418 x 23 m), surface: asphalt
