= Doyle, Lassen County, California =

Doyle
- Census designated place Unincorporated place
- Location in Lassen County and the state of California

- Location in the United States
- Coordinates: 40°01′41″N 120°06′14″W
- Country: United States
- State: California
- County: Lassen

Area
  - Total: 6.108 sq mi (15.819 km^{2})
  - Land: 6.107 sq mi (15.817 km^{2})
  - Water: 0.00077 sq mi (0.002 km^{2}) 0.01%
- Elevation: 4,275 ft (1,303 m)

Population (2020)
  - Total: 536
  - Density: 87.8/sq mi (33.9/km^{2})
- Time zone: UTC−08:00 (PST)
  - Summer (DST): UTC−07:00 (PDT)
- ZIP Code: 96109
- Area codes: 530, 837
- GNIS feature IDs: 222577; 2583001

Doyle is a census-designated place in Lassen County, California, United States. It is located 40 miles (64 km) southeast of Susanville, at an elevation of 4275 feet (1303 m). Doyle had a population of 678 at the 2010 census. It is located 45 miles (72 km) northwest of Reno, Nevada. The ZIP Code is 96109. The community is served by area code 530. Its population is 536 as of the 2020 census, down from 678 from the 2010 census.

== History ==
Oscar Doyle settled at the site in the 1870s and donated land for the town. The first post office at Doyle opened in 1908. The town lost 33 homes in the Beckwourth Complex Fire in July 2021.

== Geography ==
According to the United States Census Bureau, the CDP has a total area of 6.1 square miles (15.8 km^{2}), over 99% of which is land.

== Climate ==
Doyle has a warm-summer Mediterranean climate (Csb), according to the Köppen climate classification system. Due to its relative aridity, it nearly qualifies as having a steppe climate (BSk).

Climate data for Doyle (1923-2012)
Month	Jan	Feb	Mar	Apr	May	Jun	Jul	Aug	Sep	Oct	Nov	Dec	Year
Record high °F (°C)	66 (19)	68 (20)	80 (27)	87 (31)	98 (37)	107 (42)	111 (44)	107 (42)	105 (41)	90 (32)	76 (24)	69 (21)	111 (44)
Mean daily maximum °F (°C)	41.7 (5.4)	47.6 (8.7)	56.3 (13.5)	65.1 (18.4)	74 (23)	82.7 (28.2)	93.4 (34.1)	91.6 (33.1)	82.4 (28.0)	69.7 (20.9)	53.9 (12.2)	43.5 (6.4)	66.8 (19.3)
Mean daily minimum °F (°C)	20.1 (−6.6)	24.3 (−4.3)	28 (−2)	32.6 (0.3)	38.3 (3.5)	43.4 (6.3)	48.8 (9.3)	46.4 (8.0)	41.1 (5.1)	33.8 (1.0)	26.1 (−3.3)	21.4 (−5.9)	33.7 (0.9)
Record low °F (°C)	−31 (−35)	−24 (−31)	2 (−17)	7 (−14)	18 (−8)	12 (−11)	28 (−2)	29 (−2)	19 (−7)	8 (−13)	−10 (−23)	−25 (−32)	−31 (−35)
Average precipitation inches (mm)	1.8 (46)	1.39 (35)	1.15 (29)	0.62 (16)	0.62 (16)	0.53 (13)	0.25 (6.4)	0.22 (5.6)	0.36 (9.1)	0.76 (19)	1.25 (32)	1.73 (44)	10.69 (272)
Average snowfall inches (cm)	5.6 (14)	3.7 (9.4)	3.5 (8.9)	1.8 (4.6)	0.6 (1.5)	0 (0)	0 (0)	0 (0)	0.1 (0.25)	0.2 (0.51)	2 (5.1)	5 (13)	22.6 (57)
Average precipitation days	6	6	6	4	4	3	1	1	2	3	5	6	47
Source: WRCC

== Demographics ==
Historical population
Census	Pop.	Note	%±
2010	678		—
2020	536		−20.9%
U.S. Decennial Census; 1850–1870 1880-1890; 1900 1910 1920; 1930 1940 1950; 1960 1970 1980; 1990 2000 2010

Doyle first appeared as a census designated place in the 2010 U.S. census.

Doyle CDP, California – Racial and ethnic composition Note: the US Census treats Hispanic/Latino as an ethnic category. This table excludes Latinos from the racial categories and assigns them to a separate category. Hispanics/Latinos may be of any race.
Race / Ethnicity (NH = Non-Hispanic)	Pop 2010	Pop 2020	% 2010	% 2020
White alone (NH)	551	422	81.27%	78.73%
Black or African American alone (NH)	14	8	2.06%	1.49%
Native American or Alaska Native alone (NH)	28	8	4.13%	1.49%
Asian alone (NH)	3	4	0.44%	0.75%
Native Hawaiian or Pacific Islander alone (NH)	1	1	0.15%	0.19%
Other race alone (NH)	0	2	0.00%	0.37%
Mixed race or Multiracial (NH)	26	54	3.83%	10.07%
Hispanic or Latino (any race)	55	37	8.11%	6.90%
Total	678	536	100.00%	100.00%

The 2020 United States census reported that Doyle had a population of 536. The population density was 87.8 inhabitants per square mile (33.9/km^{2}). The racial makeup of Doyle was 435 (81.2%) White, 9 (1.7%) African American, 10 (1.9%) Native American, 4 (0.7%) Asian, 1 (0.2%) Pacific Islander, 14 (2.6%) from other races, and 63 (11.8%) from two or more races. Hispanic or Latino of any race were 37 persons (6.9%).

The whole population lived in households. There were 235 households, out of which 52 (22.1%) had children under the age of 18 living in them, 110 (46.8%) were married-couple households, 26 (11.1%) were cohabiting couple households, 39 (16.6%) had a female householder with no partner present, and 60 (25.5%) had a male householder with no partner present. 71 households (30.2%) were one person, and 34 (14.5%) were one person aged 65 or older. The average household size was 2.28. There were 142 families (60.4% of all households).

The age distribution was 108 people (20.1%) under the age of 18, 22 people (4.1%) aged 18 to 24, 120 people (22.4%) aged 25 to 44, 141 people (26.3%) aged 45 to 64, and 145 people (27.1%) who were 65 years of age or older. The median age was 49.4 years. For every 100 females, there were 121.5 males.

There were 271 housing units at an average density of 44.4 units per square mile (17.1 units/km^{2}), of which 235 (86.7%) were occupied. Of these, 174 (74.0%) were owner-occupied, and 61 (26.0%) were occupied by renters.

== Politics ==
In the state legislature, Doyle is in the 1st senatorial district, represented by Republican Megan Dahle, and the 1st Assembly district, represented by Republican Heather Hadwick.

Federally, Doyle is in California's 1st congressional district, represented by Republican James Gallagher.
