= California State Route 282 =

State highway in Coronado, California, United States

State Route 282
- State Route 282 highlighted in red

Route information
- Maintained by Caltrans
- Length: 0.691 mi (1,112 m)
- Existed: 1968–present

Major junctions
- West end: NAS North Island
- East end: SR 75 in Coronado

Location
- Country: United States
- State: California
- Counties: San Diego

Highway system
- State highways in California; Interstate; US; State; Scenic; History; Pre‑1964; Unconstructed; Deleted; Freeways
← SR 281	→ SR 283

State Route 282 (SR 282) is an east–west state highway entirely within the city of Coronado, California. It is a spur of SR 75 and connects the rest of the state highway system with Naval Air Station North Island. The road is part of a link connecting to the metropolitan area of San Diego via SR 75 and the Coronado Bay Bridge. The entire route uses a one-way couplet, with Third Street in the westbound direction and Fourth Street in the eastbound direction.

Third and Fourth streets, as part of the Coronado street system, have existed since the 19th century, and were paved in the early 20th century. SR 282 was designated in 1968, around the time the San Diego–Coronado Bridge was opened. Attempts to build first a highway, and later a tunnel, to allow base traffic to bypass the Coronado city streets, were rejected by voters in 1974 and 2010, respectively.

== Route description ==
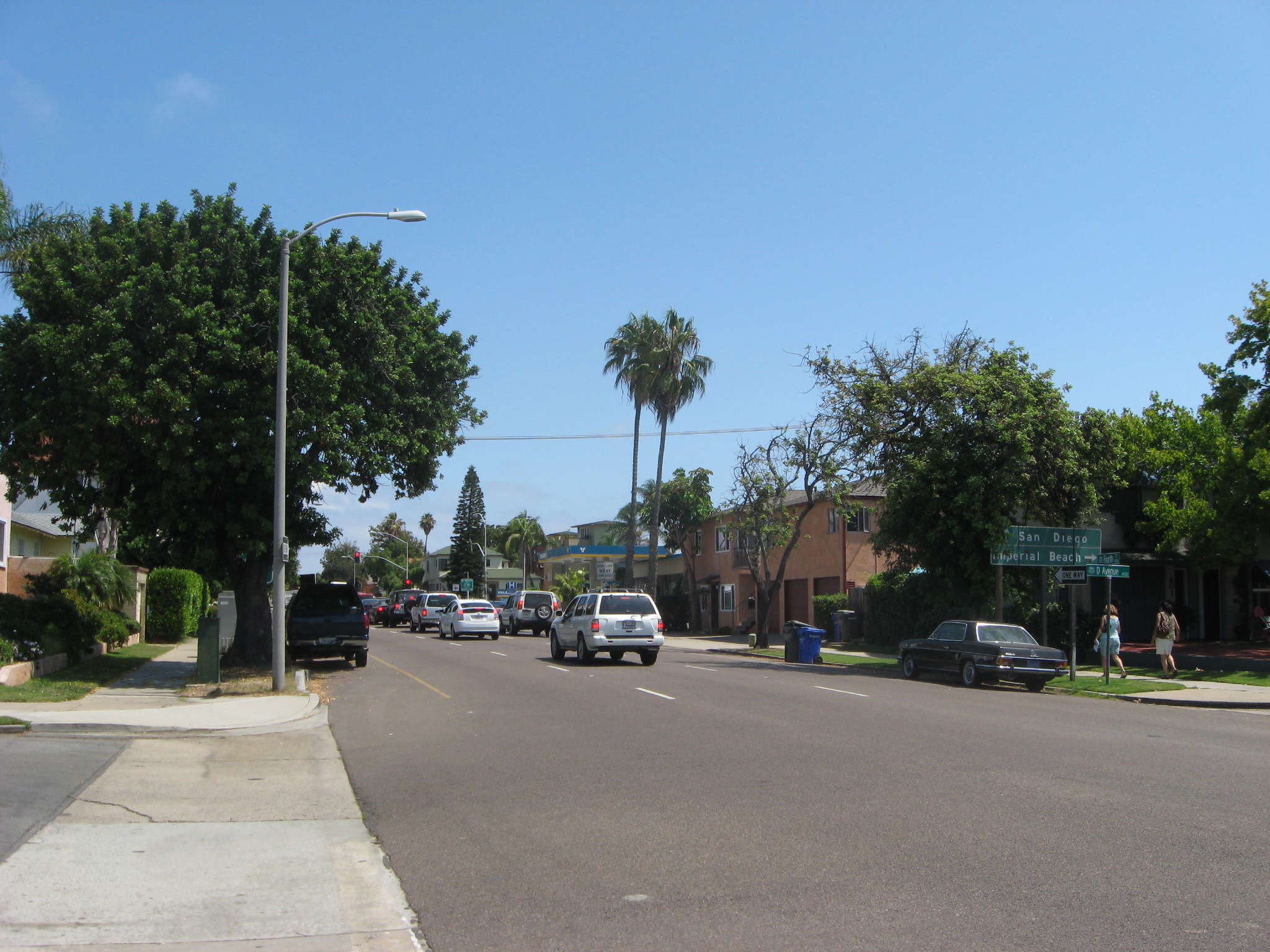
SR 282 eastbound at SR 75 in Coronado

Route 282 is defined in section 582 of the California Streets and Highways Code, and that the highway is "from Route 75 to the Naval Air Station at North Island in Coronado".

SR 282 begins at Alameda Boulevard as a one-way couplet consisting of Third and Fourth streets. The portion of Alameda Boulevard between Third and Fourth streets is also part of SR 282 westbound. McCain Boulevard and Tow Way continue west from the Fourth and Third street intersections with Alameda Boulevard into Naval Air Station North Island, respectively. Third and Fourth streets continue through the intersections of I–J avenues, Palm Avenue, and D–H avenues, passing through a residential area. Third Street goes by Palm Park, and Fourth Street by Triangle Park; both are at the intersections with Palm Avenue. SR 282 travels slightly southeast towards its terminus at SR 75 (Orange Avenue).

SR 282 is part of the National Highway System (NHS), a network of highways that are considered essential to the country's economy, defense, and mobility by the Federal Highway Administration. In 2013, SR 282 had an annual average daily traffic (AADT) of 13,300 on Fourth Avenue between J Avenue and Alameda Boulevard, and 24,200 on Alameda Boulevard between Third and Fourth Streets, the latter of which was the highest AADT for the highway.

== History ==
The intersection of Third Street and Orange Avenue dates back to at least 1890. Coronado began to commission the paving of much of its street system in the early 1910s. In November 1911, the board of trustees in Coronado approved the paving of Third Street from Orange Avenue to what was K Avenue. It soon became the goal of the city to have all streets paved before the 1915 San Diego World Exposition. The streets west of Orange Avenue were to be handled in one contract, using "decomposed granite and oil." Third Street had already been paved with this material by 1913.

SR 282 was initially designated in 1967 solely along Fourth Street from SR 75 to the Naval Air Station; however, it was not to be in effect until the San Diego–Coronado Bridge was completed. Nevertheless, before the bridge opened, the designation was added in the 1968 legislative session, along with the portion of Orange Avenue from the Coronado Ferry landing to Fourth Street, which was to be removed once the Coronado Bay Bridge opened. The designation came into effect on February 21, 1969. In April, plans were under way to repave Fourth and Third Streets and add signals at the Orange Avenue intersections. The bridge opened on August 3, 1969. In September, the City of Coronado added Third Street as a truck route going westbound to the base, in addition to the already-existing Fourth Street truck route leaving the base.

In 1974, Proposition N was proposed to attempt to resolve concerns regarding traffic in Coronado. The plan was to build another highway along the northern and eastern shore of Coronado Island, to bypass the busy residential and commercial districts and provide easy access to the North Island Naval Air Station from the western end of the bridge. The proposition asked voters whether the City Council should "actively pursue" the matter. Previous proposals had included widening Fourth Street to be able to handle traffic in both directions. Critics contended that the highway would block the view of San Diego Bay. Coronado Mayor Rolland McNelly opposed the proposal in early November 1974 as it would require approval from over 30 government agencies and would force the city to continue with it, although some declared the road "impossible to build." The voters rejected this plan, and the City Council then voted to keep traffic along Third and Fourth streets, closing the gate at First and Second streets. The bridge and the resulting traffic continued to be a hotly debated issue in the early 1980s. A plan in 1981 to convert Fourth Street into an expressway leading to the naval station was strongly opposed by the public due to the required demolition of structures and a lack of evidence that the plan would succeed in reducing traffic; by this time, Third and Fourth streets had been converted into one-way streets between the bridge and the naval station.

In April 2006, the Navy commenced construction on an entrance to the Naval Air Station from the intersection of Third Street and Alameda Boulevard. The new entrance was completed in July 2007, and the existing entrance and exit on Fourth Street was made an exit-only station. Before then, traffic entering the base had to continue southwest on Alameda Boulevard, making a left on Fourth Street. This change was expected to reduce congestion in downtown Coronado.

The City of Coronado has attempted to have a tunnel built from the Coronado bridge to the San Diego Naval Base numerous times, and hired Ledford Enterprises to help with the lobbying process in 2002 and 2006. The city endorsed a proposed study in 2004 to determine possible alternatives to resolve the traffic issues, which included keeping the status quo. On June 8, 2010, Coronado voters decided against Proposition H, which would have advised the city to undergo further investigation into building a tunnel between the Coronado bridge and the San Diego Naval Base. This concluded ten years of studies and proposals by the city of Coronado to find a way to reduce traffic to the naval station during rush hour. Critics of the proposal did not believe that the tunnel would resolve the traffic issues. Following this, the Coronado City Council voted to abolish the Tunnel Commission.

== Major intersections ==
The entire route is in Coronado, San Diego County.

mi	km	Destinations	Notes
0.00	0.00	Naval Air Station North Island (Tow Way)	Continuation beyond Alameda Boulevard; eastbound SR 282 accessible from McCain Boulevard
0.00	0.00	Alameda Boulevard	West end of SR 282
0.69	1.11	SR 75 (Orange Avenue) – San Diego, Imperial Beach, San Diego-Coronado Bay Bridge	East end of SR 282
1.000 mi = 1.609 km; 1.000 km = 0.621 mi
