= California State Route 75 =

Highway in California

State Route 75
- State Route 75 highlighted in red

Route information
- Maintained by Caltrans
- Length: 13.306 mi (21.414 km)
- Existed: 1924–present
- Tourist routes: Silver Strand Highway and the San Diego–Coronado Bridge
- Restrictions: No flammable tank vehicles or explosives on the Coronado Bridge

Major junctions
- South end: I-5 near San Ysidro
- SR 282 in Coronado
- North end: I-5 in San Diego

Location
- Country: United States
- State: California
- Counties: San Diego

Highway system
- State highways in California; Interstate; US; State; Scenic; History; Pre‑1964; Unconstructed; Deleted; Freeways
← SR 74	→ SR 76

State Route 75 (SR 75) is a 13-mile (21 km) north-south state highway in San Diego County in the U.S. state of California. It is a loop route of Interstate 5 (I-5) that begins near Imperial Beach, heading west on Palm Avenue. The route continues north along the Silver Strand, a thin strip of land between the Pacific Ocean and San Diego Bay, through Silver Strand State Beach. SR 75 then passes through the city of Coronado as Orange Avenue and continues onto the San Diego–Coronado Bay Bridge, which traverses the bay, before joining back with I-5 near downtown San Diego.

The Silver Strand Highway was constructed and open to the public by 1924. What would become SR 75 was added to the state highway system in 1933, and designated Legislative Route 199 in 1935. SR 75 was not officially designated until the 1964 state highway renumbering. The Coronado Bay Bridge opened in 1969, and provided a direct connection between San Diego and Coronado. Since then, various proposals have taken place to relieve commuter traffic between San Diego and Naval Air Station North Island that traverses the city of Coronado. However, none of these proposals have gained support, including an attempt in 2010.

== Route description ==
Route 75 is defined in section 375, subsection (a), of the California Streets and Highways Code, and that the highway is "from Route 5 to Route 5 via the Silver Strand and the San Diego-Coronado Toll Bridge". Subsections (a) and (b) permit the state to relinquish control of portions of the highway in Imperial Beach and San Diego to those cities.

SR 75 begins as Palm Avenue at I-5 in the Nestor neighborhood of San Diego, heading westbound from the Southland Plaza shopping center. The route travels between the communities of Palm City and Nestor before entering the city limits of Imperial Beach. There, SR 75 curves to the north, becoming Silver Strand Boulevard and crossing into Coronado. SR 75 continues onto the peninsula containing Coronado Island, separated from the mainland by San Diego Bay. The highway passes through the Silver Strand Training Complex and the South Bay Study Area before entering the Coronado Cays subdivision and paralleling Silver Strand State Beach.

After this, SR 75 passes through the United States Naval Amphibious Base for a few miles before entering downtown Coronado. The highway becomes Orange Avenue and turns north-northeast as the main street through Coronado. SR 75 intersects SR 282 at the one-way couplet of Third and Fourth Streets; SR 282 continues west on Third Street and returns to SR 75 on Fourth Street, while SR 75 continues east on Fourth Street and heads west towards Orange Avenue on Third Street. The one-way couplet is brief, and SR 75 becomes a divided highway before crossing the Coronado Bridge. While on the bridge, SR 75 crosses into the city of San Diego again.

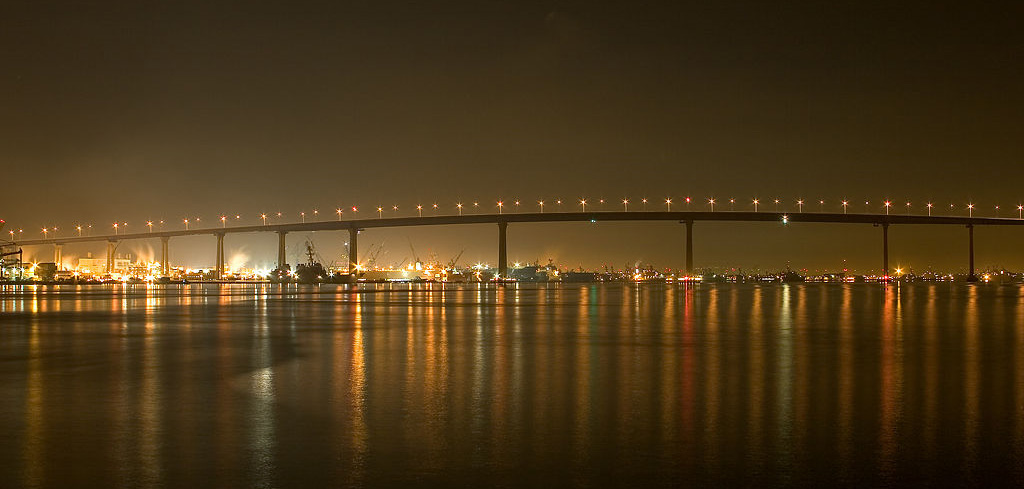
The Coronado Bay Bridge at night

Once on the mainland, SR 75 has a northbound exit to National Avenue and a southbound entrance from Cesar E. Chavez Parkway. Through traffic is directed onto I-5 south or north in Logan Heights, where SR 75 ends.

SR 75 is eligible for the State Scenic Highway System. It is officially designated as a scenic route for nearly its entire length, from the Imperial Beach city limit to Avenida del Sol in Coronado, and the portion across the Coronado Bridge meaning that it is a substantial section of highway passing through a "memorable landscape" with no "visual intrusions", where the potential designation has gained popular favor with the community. SR 75 is also part of the National Highway System, a network of highways that are considered essential to the country's economy, defense, and mobility by the Federal Highway Administration. In 2013, SR 75 had an annual average daily traffic (AADT) of 66,000 on the Coronado Bridge (the highest AADT for the highway), and 16,000 between Rainbow Drive and 7th Street in Imperial Beach (the lowest AADT for the highway).

== History ==
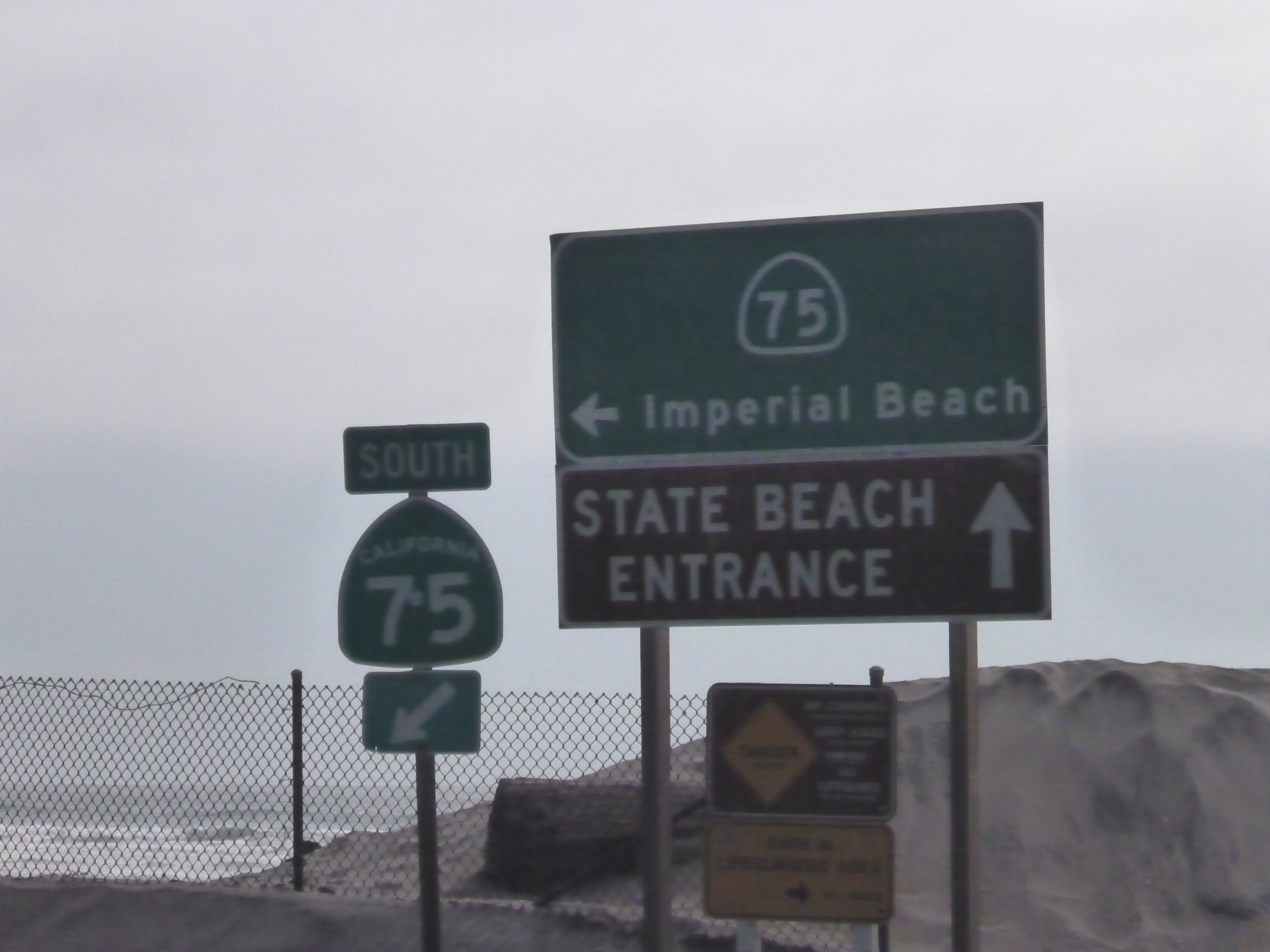
California Route 75 sign

=== Construction ===
The intersection of Third Street and Orange Avenue dates back to at least 1890. The process of paving portions of Orange Avenue began in 1893, with an estimated cost of $50,000 (about $2 million in 2024 dollars); three miles (4.8 km) of sidewalks were also included. The plan was to make the avenue "one of the most beautiful in Southern California." From Palm City to Imperial Beach, the road was paved by 1920. The Silver Strand Highway opened in 1924 during a festival at the Tent City summer resort in Coronado, and went from Coronado to Palm City. By 1928, all streets in the city of Coronado had been paved, which was expected to encourage people to visit Tent City.

Plans to transfer the Silver Strand Highway to state maintenance were in place as early as November 1931, and were to take effect once Silver Strand State Park was completed and open. In 1933, the highway from the San Diego–Coronado Ferry to Route 2 (now I-5) was added to the state highway system, and was designated as Legislative Route 199 two years later. By that same year, Sign Route 75 was posted from U.S. Route 101 (US 101) in Palm City to the ferry landing. After a subsequent highway project around 1939, SR 75 passed through Tent City and, according to William Cecil, the city's public works director in 1998, "contributed to its demise."

The first contract for widening the highway between Coronado and Coronado Heights was awarded in 1944, as this part of the road was "now too narrow and dilapidated to meet traffic requirements." The State Highway Commission allocated $25,000 (about $241,000 in 2024 dollars) to install traffic signals at the intersection of SR 75 and US 101 in March 1951. Plans to widen the road to four lanes were put on hold in July.

By July 1952, it had been disclosed that some local businesses near Palm City had lodged opposition to the widening of the highway after $500,000 (about $4.73 million in 2024 dollars) had been allocated to the project. Following protests from local businessmen regarding the design of the median, the planned removal of access to intersecting streets, and the planned changes to street parking, Governor Earl Warren wrote to the San Diego Public Safety Committee, hoping to have the dispute resolved. In November, funds were allocated to acquire land for the construction in the 1953–1954 state budget. A year later, $430,000 (about $4.02 million in 2024 dollars) had been allocated to the widening project. A contract was given to the Daley Corporation to carry out the construction in 1955. The highway was to be widened to four lanes, and would add three pedestrian crossings. The completion of the widening project was announced on August 10, 1956. The final cost of the project was $850,000 (about $7.49 million in 2024 dollars), with money from the City of Coronado and the state.

=== Designation and bridge construction ===
Discussion regarding a bridge dates back to 1926; however, the Navy opposed the plan over concerns that an enemy could destroy the bridge and trap ships in the harbor. In 1955, the California Senate approved $200,000 (about $1.82 million in 2024 dollars) to conduct a study regarding a possible vehicular tunnel from San Diego to Coronado. Later, in June 1961, a proposal for an underwater tube along SR 75 was formally proposed, and would not have needed the approval of the residents of Coronado. Interviews of commuters were planned in August, to determine the traffic patterns along SR 75. The survey took place on October 2 along Silver Strand Boulevard.

The SR 75 designation was originally established in 1963 with two segments: from I-5 to the ferry across San Diego Bay from Coronado to downtown, and from SR 125 to I-5. In 1967, the Coronado Bridge was scheduled to be added to the route once it was completed, and the portion from Fourth Street to the ferry was deemed as temporary until the bridge opened. Construction began in February. Coronado residents largely opposed the bridge, but Governor Pat Brown "overrode their wishes" according to former city councilman Bob Odiorne, who also claimed that the opposition caused the city to lose opportunities to move the approaches to the bridge away from residential areas. Following attempts from Barbara Hutchinson, the vice president of the Kearny Mesa Town Council, to ask the Coronado and San Diego city councils to intervene in the construction, San Diego city attorney Edward Butler stated that the state had the ultimate authority to decide whether or not to build the bridge, and that the City of San Diego could not interfere. Before the bridge opened, in 1968, the changes originally proposed by the Legislature in 1967 were made to the law; the designation came into effect on February 21, 1969. The bridge eventually opened on August 3, 1969.

By 1969, Palm Avenue was the primary commercial street in Imperial Beach, and was described by the San Diego Union as "a strip of large signs and businesses. It is not a 'downtown.'" Plans were under way to add an interchange at Silver Strand State Beach for the Coronado Cays development. In September, the City of Coronado added Orange Avenue south of Third Street as a truck route leading to the base. By May 1970, the part of SR 75 on the Coronado Bridge had been declared a scenic highway. President Richard Nixon and Mexican president Díaz Ordaz used Orange Avenue as a motorcade route on September 3, 1970, en route to the Hotel del Coronado.

=== Proposals and renumbering ===
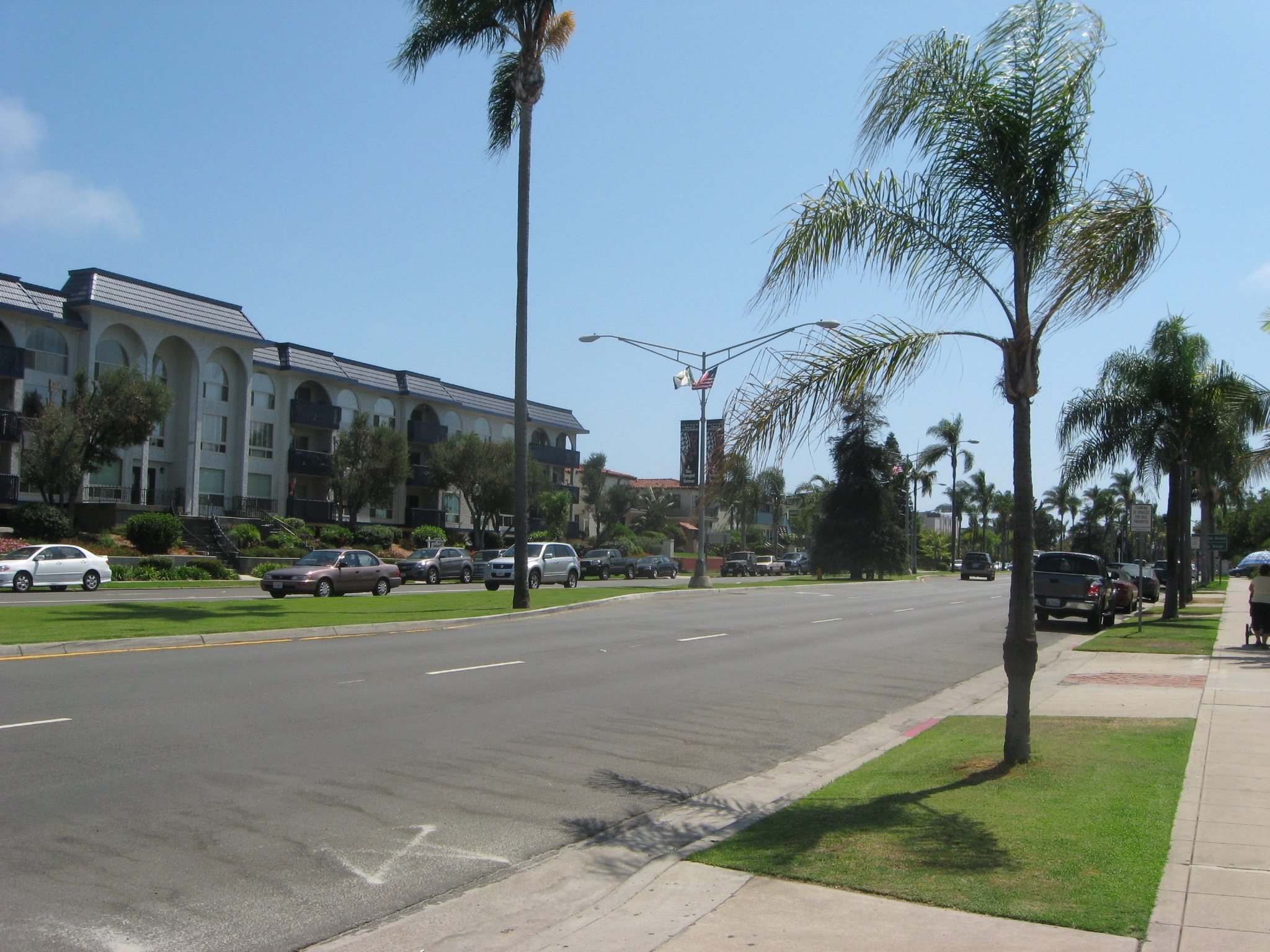
Orange Avenue just south of the SR 282 intersection in Coronado

Proposition N was proposed in 1974 to attempt to resolve concerns regarding traffic in Coronado. The plan was to build another highway along the northern and eastern shore of Coronado Island, to bypass the busy residential and commercial districts and provide easy access to the Silver Strand from the western end of the bridge. The proposition asked voters whether the City Council should "actively pursue" the matter. Critics contended that the highway would block the view of San Diego Bay, and that the city would be unable to alter traffic patterns in the meantime. Coronado mayor Rolland McNeely opposed the proposal in early November 1974 as it would require approval from over thirty government agencies and would force the city to continue with building this road, although some declared it "impossible to build." The voters rejected this plan.

The portion of SR 75 from Pomona Avenue in Coronado to Imperial Beach was also recommended to become a scenic highway in February 1974. Future improvements to the Imperial Beach – Coronado portion were cancelled in April. In 1976, the California State Legislature renumbered the portion from I-5 to SR 125 as SR 117, which later became SR 905. The change took effect at the beginning of 1977. The renumbering was to reduce confusion with the Coronado portion, according to Caltrans regional director Jacob Dekema; new signs were to be put into place shortly thereafter. The bridge and the resulting traffic continued to be a hotly debated issue in the early 1980s. A plan in 1981 to convert Fourth Street into an expressway leading to the naval station was strongly opposed by the public due to the required demolition of structures and a lack of evidence that the plan would succeed in reducing traffic; by this time, Third and Fourth streets had been converted into one-way streets between the bridge and the naval station. A major renovation of the bridge was scheduled for late 1992, which would include a movable barrier to prevent head-on collisions and necessary resurfacing of the roadway. Work was underway in January 1993 on the $4 million project (about $8 million in 2024 dollars), but it was behind the three-month schedule by 11 days due to rainfall and was expected to be completed by March.

When the Coronado Bridge opened, a toll of 60 cents was charged to use the bridge. In 1980, the toll became $1.20, charged only in the westbound direction towards Coronado. A seventh toll booth was to be constructed in September 1987. The toll dropped to $1 in 1988. The bridge tolls ended at 10 p.m. on June 27, 2002, after the San Diego Association of Governments decided to stop collecting tolls; drivers paid a total of $197 million throughout the years. The speed limit was decreased to 25 miles per hour (40 km/h) in October 2005 along Third and Fourth streets, after traffic increased by 20 percent following the removal of the toll. Traffic barriers along Third Street to block traffic from turning onto intersecting streets were removed in November 2004, following voter approval.

The City of Coronado has attempted to have a tunnel built from the Coronado bridge to the San Diego Naval Base numerous times, and hired Ledford Enterprises to help with the lobbying process in 2002 and 2006. The city endorsed a proposed study in 2004 to determine possible alternatives to resolve the traffic issues, which included keeping the status quo. On June 8, 2010, Coronado voters decided against Proposition H, which would have advised the city to undergo further investigation into building the tunnel. This concluded ten years of studies and proposals by the city of Coronado to find a way to reduce traffic to the naval station during rush hour. Critics of the proposal did not believe that the tunnel would resolve the traffic issues on the northern part of SR 75 or on SR 282. Following this, the Coronado City Council voted to abolish the Tunnel Commission that had been formed to study the issue.

Efforts were underway by Imperial Beach city officials to improve the reputation and economic standing of the Palm Avenue area in the first decade of the 21st century. The area was described by the San Diego Union-Tribune as a "hodgepodge of vacant land and aging apartment buildings and businesses, many in need of a coat of paint" in 2003. Residents hoped to revitalize the area, providing commerce right next to an entrance to the beach. City officials offered local business owners loans for necessary construction or rehabilitation in 2005. The Imperial Beach city council approved the redevelopment of the Palm Avenue corridor in 2008, following a study in 2003. A Palm Avenue Commercial Corridor Master Plan was endorsed in February 2009, in efforts to improve the commercial area. In September 2012, the Imperial Beach city council raised objections over the Caltrans decision to increase the speed limit on SR 75 to 45 miles per hour (72 km/h) from 40 miles per hour (64 km/h) on the portion of the highway from Delaware Street to the western Imperial Beach city limit due to concerns about safety. The rest of the highway was to retain the 40 miles per hour (64 km/h) speed limit.

== Major intersections ==
Except where prefixed with a letter, postmiles were measured on the road as it was in 1964, based on the alignment that existed at the time, and do not necessarily reflect current mileage. Postmile prefixes include: R reflecting a realignment in the route since then, M indicating a second realignment, L referring to an overlap due to a correction or change, and T indicating postmiles classified as temporary. Segments that remain unconstructed or have been relinquished to local control may be omitted. The entire route is in San Diego County. All exits are unnumbered.

Location	Postmile	Destinations	Notes
San Diego	8.93	Palm Avenue	Continuation beyond I-5
San Diego	9.00	I-5 – San Diego	Exit 5A on I-5
Coronado	13.97	Coronado Cays Boulevard	Southbound interchange and northbound at-grade intersection
Coronado	R19.70	SR 282 west (3rd Street / 4th Street) – North Island	East end of SR 282; travels one-way west on 3rd Street and east on 4th Street
San Diego Bay	R20.49	San Diego–Coronado Bridge	
San Diego	R22.26	I-5 south / National Avenue	Interchange; northbound exit and southbound entrance
San Diego	R22.26	I-5 north – Downtown	Interchange; exit 14A on I-5
1.000 mi = 1.609 km; 1.000 km = 0.621 mi: Incomplete access
