= Chilcoot-Vinton, California =

Chilcoot-Vinton
- Unincorporated Community; Census Designated Place
- Location in Plumas County and the state of California

- Location in the United States
- Coordinates: 39°48′2″N 120°8′40″W
- Country: United States
- State: California
- County: Plumas

Area
  - Total: 13.21 sq mi (34.21 km^{2})
  - Land: 13.21 sq mi (34.21 km^{2})
  - Water: 0 sq mi (0.00 km^{2}) 0%

Population (2020)
  - Total: 446
  - Density: 33.8/sq mi (13.04/km^{2})
- Time zone: UTC-8 (Pacific (PST))
  - Summer (DST): UTC-7 (PDT)
- ZIP code: 96105
- Area codes: 530, 837
- FIPS code: 06-13077

Chilcoot-Vinton is a census-designated place (CDP) in Plumas County, California, United States. The population was 446 at the 2020 census, down from 454 at the 2010 census. It consists of the communities of Chilcoot and Vinton.

== Geography ==
Chilcoot-Vinton is located at 39°48′2″N 120°8′40″W (39.800609, -120.144398).

According to the United States Census Bureau, the CDP has a total area of 13.2 square miles (34 km^{2}), all land. Chilcoot and Vinton are actually two separate small communities that are two miles apart on State Route 70, but were grouped together by the USCB for statistical purposes.

Frenchman Lake is a nearby recreation area known for its fishing, camping and water sports and is the largest contributor to the economies of Vinton and Chilcoot.

== Climate ==
Chilcoot-Vinton has a dry-summer continental climate (Dsb) according to the Köppen climate classification system.

Climate data for Vinton (1950-2012)
Month	Jan	Feb	Mar	Apr	May	Jun	Jul	Aug	Sep	Oct	Nov	Dec	Year
Record high °F (°C)	65 (18)	66 (19)	74 (23)	82 (28)	89 (32)	99 (37)	100 (38)	96 (36)	93 (34)	91 (33)	73 (23)	63 (17)	100 (38)
Mean daily maximum °F (°C)	42.9 (6.1)	45.5 (7.5)	51.4 (10.8)	57.9 (14.4)	65.7 (18.7)	76 (24)	86.2 (30.1)	85.7 (29.8)	80.7 (27.1)	64.8 (18.2)	53.4 (11.9)	41.1 (5.1)	62.6 (17.0)
Mean daily minimum °F (°C)	21 (−6)	20.9 (−6.2)	26.2 (−3.2)	28.4 (−2.0)	32.3 (0.2)	39.5 (4.2)	43.7 (6.5)	42.2 (5.7)	37.3 (2.9)	32.1 (0.1)	24.5 (−4.2)	16.5 (−8.6)	30.4 (−0.9)
Record low °F (°C)	−4 (−20)	−5 (−21)	3 (−16)	7 (−14)	14 (−10)	23 (−5)	28 (−2)	28 (−2)	20 (−7)	12 (−11)	−8 (−22)	−16 (−27)	−16 (−27)
Average precipitation inches (mm)	2.23 (57)	1.77 (45)	1.57 (40)	0.83 (21)	0.91 (23)	0.67 (17)	0.3 (7.6)	0.34 (8.6)	0.45 (11)	0.95 (24)	1.51 (38)	2.21 (56)	13.73 (349)
Average snowfall inches (cm)	7.3 (19)	7.5 (19)	7.7 (20)	3.2 (8.1)	1.4 (3.6)	0.1 (0.25)	0 (0)	0 (0)	0.1 (0.25)	0.4 (1.0)	3.1 (7.9)	7.5 (19)	38.3 (97)
Average precipitation days	8	7	8	6	6	4	2	2	2	4	6	7	62
Source: WRCC

== Demographics ==
Historical population
Census	Pop.	Note	%±
2000	387		—
2010	454		17.3%
2020	446		−1.8%
U.S. Decennial Census; 1850–1870 1880-1890; 1900 1910 1920; 1930 1940 1950; 1960 1970 1980; 1990 2000 2010

Chilcoot-Vinton first appeared as a census designated place in the 2000 U.S. census.

=== Racial and ethnic composition ===
Chilcoot-Vinton CDP, California – Racial and ethnic composition Note: the US Census treats Hispanic/Latino as an ethnic category. This table excludes Latinos from the racial categories and assigns them to a separate category. Hispanics/Latinos may be of any race.
Race / Ethnicity (NH = Non-Hispanic)	Pop 2000	Pop 2010	Pop 2020	% 2000	% 2010	% 2020
White alone (NH)	360	399	385	93.02%	87.89%	86.32%
Black or African American alone (NH)	1	0	0	0.26%	0.00%	0.00%
Native American or Alaska Native alone (NH)	2	4	10	0.52%	0.88%	2.24%
Asian alone (NH)	0	1	4	0.00%	0.22%	0.90%
Native Hawaiian or Pacific Islander alone (NH)	2	0	0	0.52%	0.00%	0.00%
Other race alone (NH)	0	0	0	0.00%	0.00%	0.00%
Mixed race or Multiracial (NH)	2	12	19	0.52%	2.64%	4.26%
Hispanic or Latino (any race)	20	38	28	5.17%	8.37%	6.28%
Total	387	454	446	100.00%	100.00%	100.00%

=== 2020 census ===
As of the 2020 census, Chilcoot-Vinton had a population of 446. The median age was 42.4 years. 23.5% of residents were under the age of 18 and 21.3% of residents were 65 years of age or older. For every 100 females there were 100.9 males, and for every 100 females age 18 and over there were 94.9 males age 18 and over.

0.0% of residents lived in urban areas, while 100.0% lived in rural areas.

There were 176 households in Chilcoot-Vinton, of which 32.4% had children under the age of 18 living in them. Of all households, 52.8% were married-couple households, 24.4% were households with a male householder and no spouse or partner present, and 16.5% were households with a female householder and no spouse or partner present. About 22.8% of all households were made up of individuals and 9.7% had someone living alone who was 65 years of age or older.

There were 207 housing units, of which 15.0% were vacant. The homeowner vacancy rate was 0.7% and the rental vacancy rate was 0.0%.

=== 2010 census ===
The 2010 United States census reported that Chilcoot-Vinton had a population of 454. The population density was 34.4 inhabitants per square mile (13.3/km^{2}). The racial makeup of Chilcoot-Vinton was 418 (92.1%) White, 1 (0.2%) African American, 4 (0.9%) Native American, 1 (0.2%) Asian, 0 (0.0%) Pacific Islander, 9 (2.0%) from other races, and 21 (4.6%) from two or more races. Hispanic or Latino of any race were 38 persons (8.4%).

The Census reported that 454 people (100% of the population) lived in households, 0 (0%) lived in non-institutionalized group quarters, and 0 (0%) were institutionalized.

There were 196 households, out of which 49 (25.0%) had children under the age of 18 living in them, 101 (51.5%) were opposite-sex married couples living together, 10 (5.1%) had a female householder with no husband present, 12 (6.1%) had a male householder with no wife present. There were 8 (4.1%) unmarried opposite-sex partnerships, and 1 (0.5%) same-sex married couples or partnerships. 64 households (32.7%) were made up of individuals, and 28 (14.3%) had someone living alone who was 65 years of age or older. The average household size was 2.32. There were 123 families (62.8% of all households); the average family size was 2.93.

The population was spread out, with 91 people (20.0%) under the age of 18, 39 people (8.6%) aged 18 to 24, 92 people (20.3%) aged 25 to 44, 165 people (36.3%) aged 45 to 64, and 67 people (14.8%) who were 65 years of age or older. The median age was 45.6 years. For every 100 females, there were 113.1 males. For every 100 females age 18 and over, there were 109.8 males.

There were 248 housing units at an average density of 18.8 per square mile (7.3/km^{2}), of which 153 (78.1%) were owner-occupied, and 43 (21.9%) were occupied by renters. The homeowner vacancy rate was 5.0%; the rental vacancy rate was 12.2%. 341 people (75.1% of the population) lived in owner-occupied housing units and 113 people (24.9%) lived in rental housing units.

=== 2000 census ===
As of the census of 2000, there were 387 people, 163 households, and 101 families residing in the CDP. The population density was 29.3 inhabitants per square mile (11.3/km^{2}). There were 202 housing units at an average density of 15.3 per square mile (5.9/km^{2}). The racial makeup of the CDP was 95.09% White, 0.26% Black or African American, 0.52% Native American, 0.52% Pacific Islander, 3.10% from other races, and 0.52% from two or more races. 5.17% of the population were Hispanic or Latino of any race.

There were 163 households, out of which 30.7% had children under the age of 18 living with them, 52.1% were married couples living together, 6.1% had a female householder with no husband present, and 38.0% were non-families. 36.2% of all households were made up of individuals, and 8.0% had someone living alone who was 65 years of age or older. The average household size was 2.37 and the average family size was 3.12.

In the CDP, the population was spread out, with 28.7% under the age of 18, 4.7% from 18 to 24, 25.1% from 25 to 44, 32.8% from 45 to 64, and 8.8% who were 65 years of age or older. The median age was 39 years. For every 100 females, there were 101.6 males. For every 100 females age 18 and over, there were 112.3 males.

The median income for a household in the CDP was $35,938, and the median income for a family was $39,583. Males had a median income of $42,361 versus $21,406 for females. The per capita income for the CDP was $17,355. About 10.0% of families and 12.0% of the population were below the poverty line, including 9.0% of those under age 18 and none of those age 65 or over.

== Politics ==
In the state legislature, Chilcoot-Vinton is in the 1st senatorial district, represented by Republican Megan Dahle, and the 1st Assembly district, represented by Republican Heather Hadwick.

Federally, Chilcoot-Vinton is in California's 3rd congressional district, represented by Independent Kevin Kiley.

== Education ==
It is in the Sierra-Plumas Joint Unified School District.

== See also ==
- List of places in California
