= Silver Strand (San Diego County) =

Isthmus in San Diego County, California

Coordinates: 32.64660°N 117.14790°W

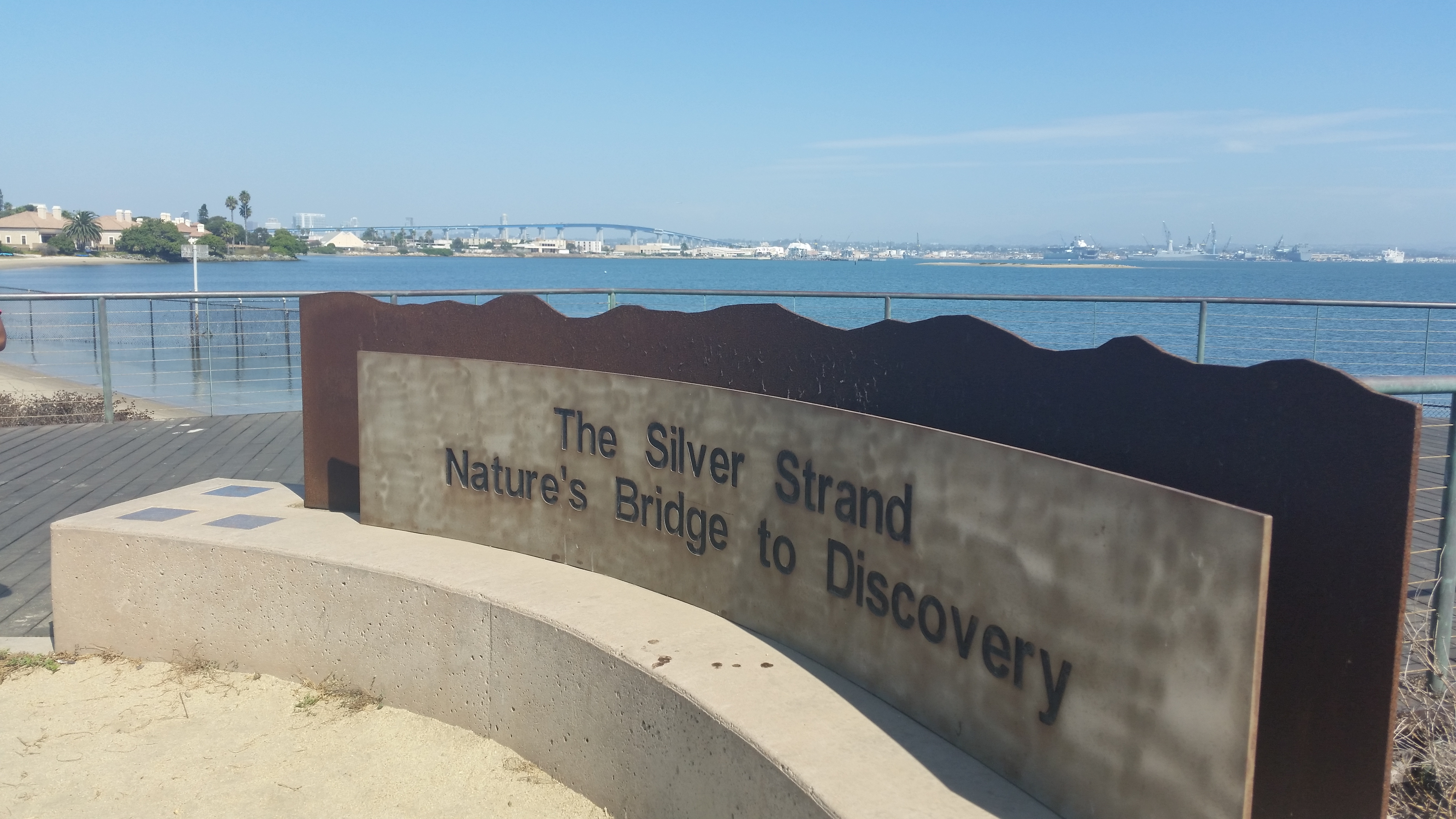
Sign at the north end of Silver Strand

Silver Strand, or simply The Strand, is a low, narrow, sandy isthmus or a human-constructed tombolo 7 miles (11 km) long in San Diego County, California, partially within Silver Strand State Beach. It connects Coronado with Imperial Beach. Together with the Point Loma peninsula it shelters and defines San Diego Bay.

State Route 75 (SR 75) runs the length of the strand and is a popular site for jogging and bicycling. The Silver Strand Half Marathon is run along the route each November. The ocean side of the strand features 2.5 miles (4.0 km) of coastline trimmed with silver shells (thus named Silver Strand).

== Beach ==
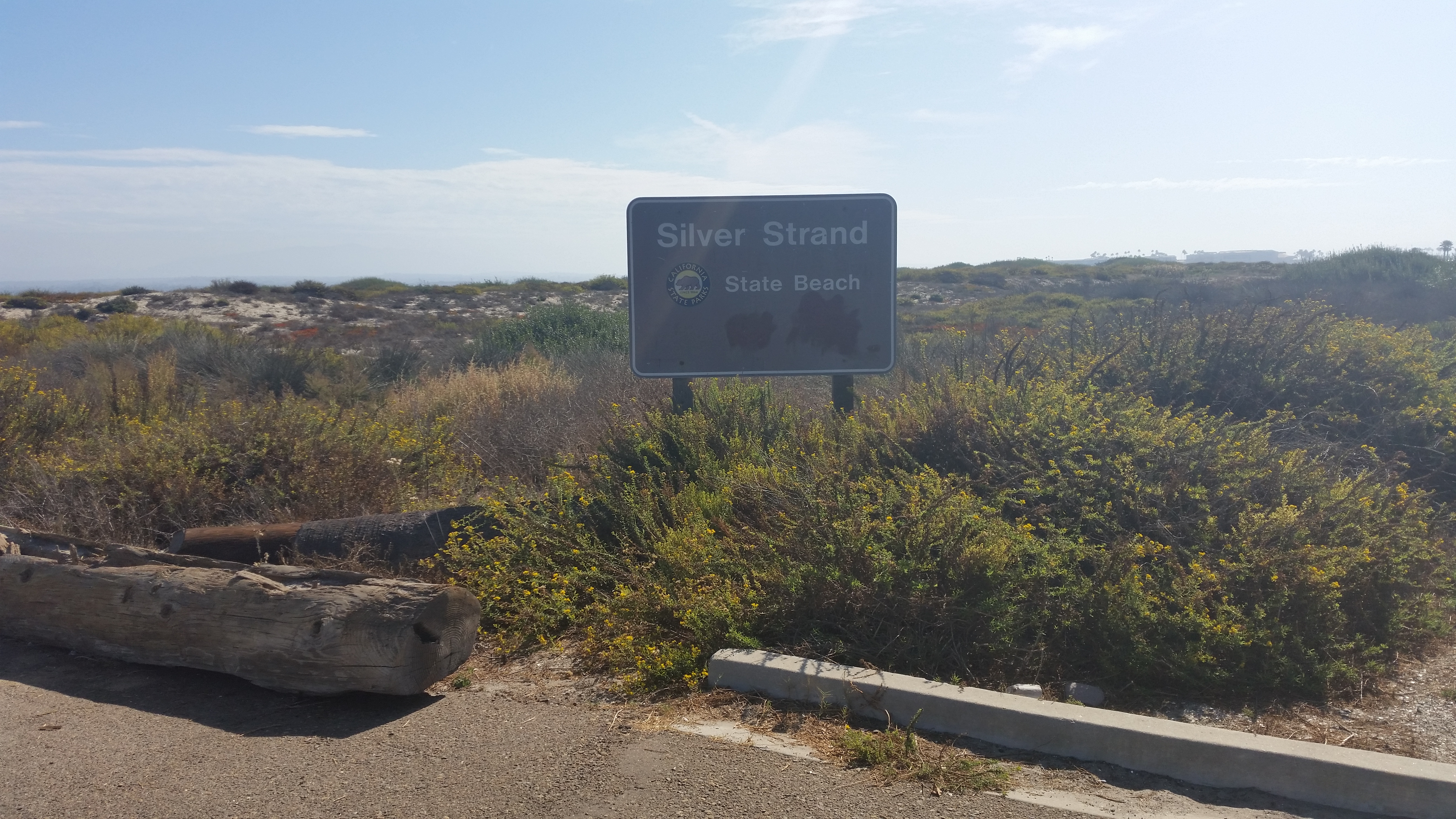
Northern extreme of the east side of Silver Strand State Beach

The Silver Strand State Beach is just 4.5 miles (7.2 km) south of Coronado on SR 75. The beach offers many activities including camping, surfing, swimming, body boarding, jet skiing, sailing, water skiing, beach volleyball and fishing. There are approximately 130 first come, first served campsites. Park facilities include four large parking lots, which can accommodate up to 1,000 vehicles. Popular activities at this recreational destination include camping, fishing, swimming, surfing, boating, water-skiing, volleyball, and picnicking. Anglers can fish for perch, corbina, grunion and yellow-fin croaker.

== Navy bases ==
The beaches north and south of the state beach are Department of Defense property. North of it is Naval Amphibious Base Coronado and south of it is Silver Strand Training Complex. Much of the SEALs' training takes place on the beaches.

== See also ==
- List of beaches in San Diego County
- List of California state parks
- SS Monte Carlo
