= Naval Amphibious Base Coronado =

US Navy installation near San Diego, California, United States

- Part of Naval Base Coronado
- Coronado, California in the United States
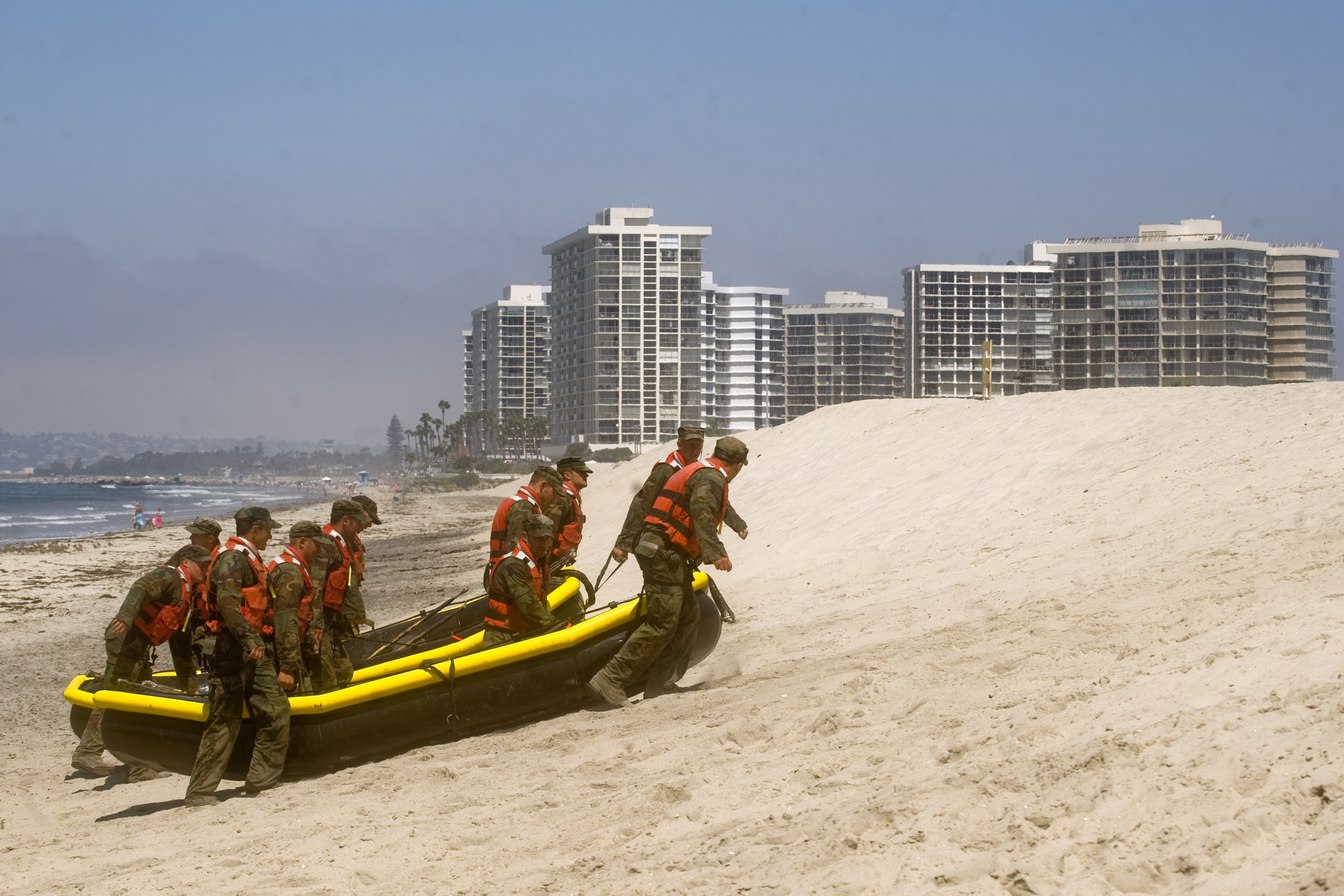
- Members of BUD/S Class 284 participate in Hell Week at the Naval Special Warfare Center, Naval Amphibious Base Coronado, Aug. 13, 2010.

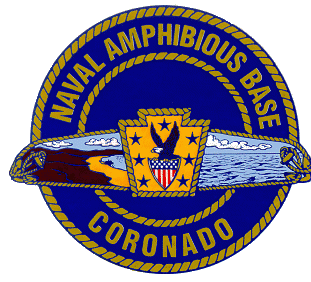

Site information
- Type: Naval base
- Owner: Department of Defense
- Operator: US Navy
- Controlled by: Navy Region Southwest
- Condition: Operational

Location
- Location within California Location within the United States
- Coordinates: 32°40′31.69″N 117°9′38.33″W

Site history
- Built: 1943–1944 (as Amphibious Training Base)
- In use: 1944 – present

Garrison information
- Current commander: Captain Newt McKissick
- Garrison: Naval Special Warfare Center

Naval Amphibious Base Coronado (NAB Coronado) is a US naval installation in Coronado, California. The base, situated on Silver Strand between San Diego Bay and the Pacific Ocean, is a major United States Navy shore command, supporting over 30 tenant commands, and is the West Coast focal point for special and expeditionary warfare training and operations. The on‑base population is 5,000 military personnel and 7,000 students and reservists. The base is one of the eight components of Naval Base Coronado (NBC).

== History ==
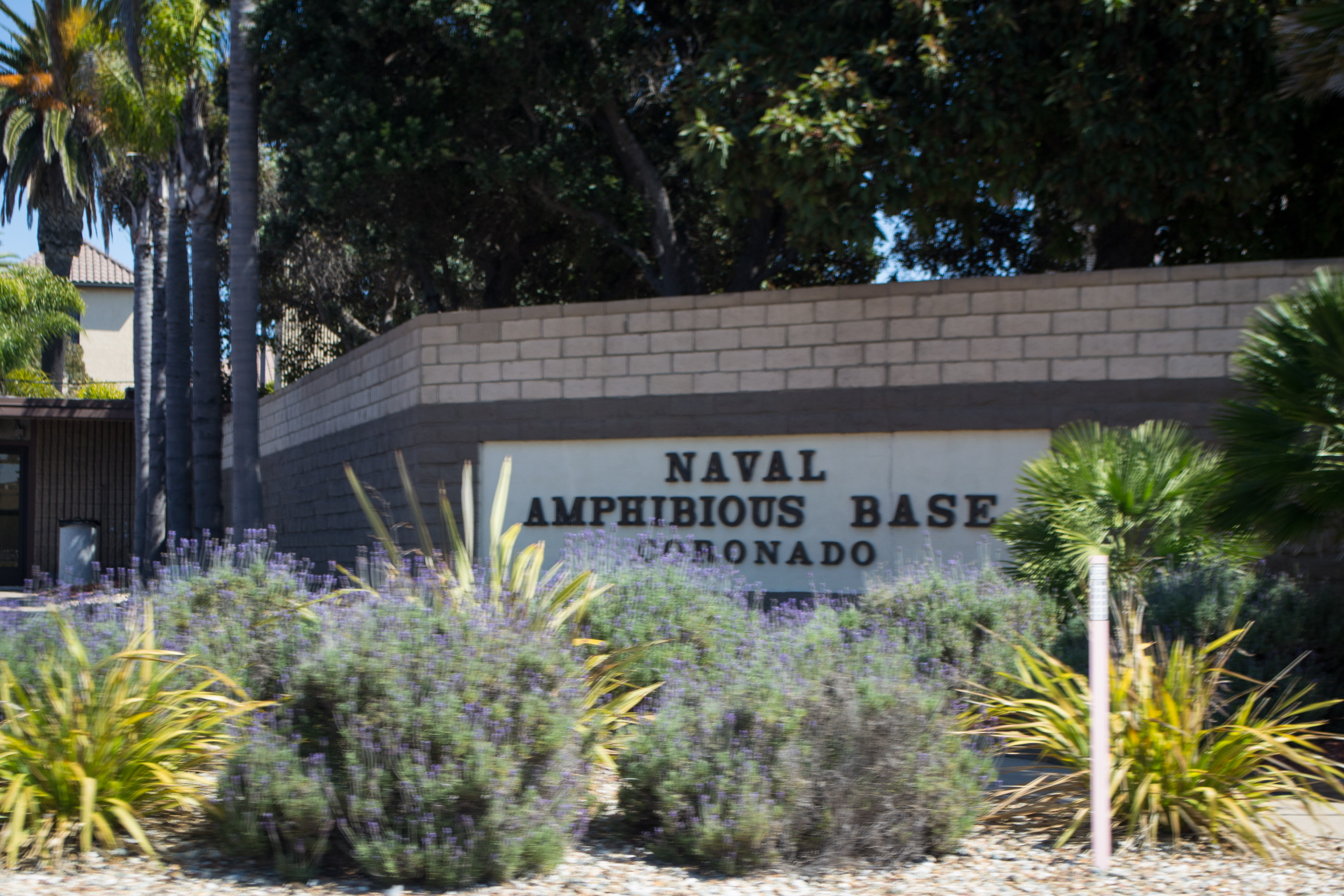
Naval Amphibious Base Coronado

Formally commissioned in January 1944, Naval Amphibious Base (NAB), Coronado provides a shore base for the operations, training, and support of naval amphibious units on the West Coast. It is one of only two Navy amphibious training bases in the United States. NAB is approximately 1,000 acres (4 km^{2}) in size and is composed of the Main Base, training beaches, California least tern preserve, recreational marina, enlisted family housing, and state park. State Route 75 separates NAB into surfside (ocean) and bayside sections. The majority of the bayside is composed of fill materials dredged from San Diego Bay in the early 1940s. Amphibious training is conducted on both surfside and bayside beaches. To the south of the Main Base, the majority of amphibious training activities takes place on about 257 acres (1.0 km^{2}) of ocean beachfront property, leased from the State of California. A least tern nesting preserve is located on North and South Delta Beach between the NAB Marina and Main Base. NAB is located within the city of Coronado, California, a community of approximately 30,000. The city of Coronado covers nearly 9 square miles (23 km^{2}) of land, and NAB lies south of the main residential and commercial portions of the city. Another naval facility, Naval Air Station (NAS) North Island, is located northwest of the city of Coronado. South of NAB is the Silver Strand.

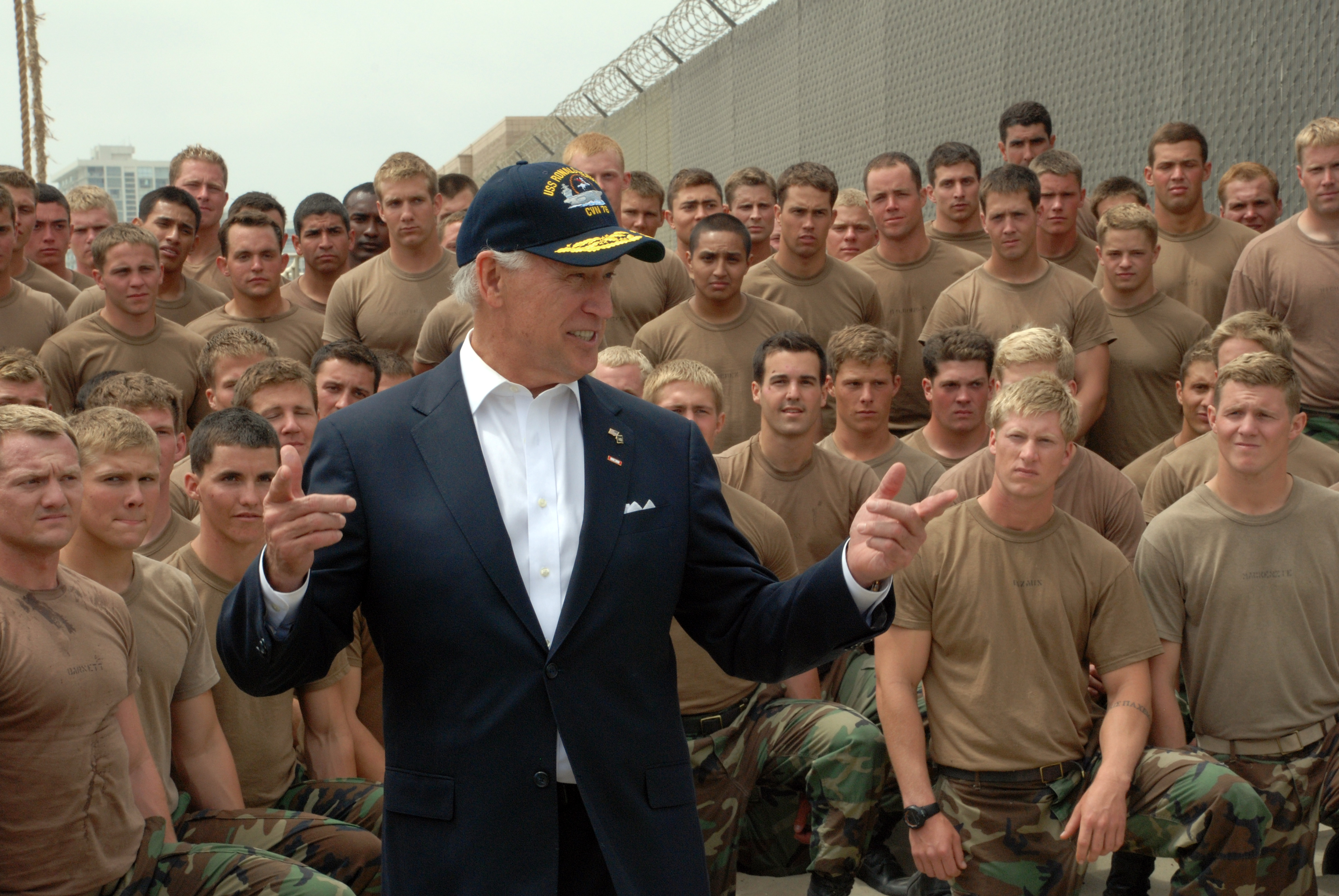
Vice President Joe Biden speaks to BUD/S candidates at NAB Coronado in May 2009

In June 1943, the Secretary of the Navy authorized the establishment of the Amphibious Training Base in the San Diego area to meet wartimes demands for trained landing craft crews. These crews were deployed to the South Pacific area of operations, where their successful and historical efforts were contributory to the conclusion of World War II. Training for infantry coordination with naval artillery and attack aircraft was provided at the Naval Gunfire Liaison School and Support Air Control School. The streets of the base bear the names of those famous battles which led to the Empire of Japan's defeat: Guadalcanal, Tarawa, Tulagi, and Bougainville, to name a few.

The base has also provided training for Underwater Demolition Teams, United States Navy SEALs, brown-water Navy personnel, and Naval Reserve Officers Training Corps midshipmen. In 1946, the base was renamed Naval Amphibious Base (NAB) Coronado and its primary mission was changed to that of providing major administrative and logistical support to the amphibious units which are located on the base. The base also conducts research and tests of newly developed amphibious equipment.

== Current operations ==
NAB Coronado is the home to over 30 tenant commands with a population of approximately 5,000 personnel, including major commands such as Commander, Naval Surface Forces Pacific (COMNAVSURFPAC), Commander Naval Special Warfare (SPECWAR) Command and the Commander Expeditionary Warfare Training Group (EWTG) Pacific.

== Major commands ==
- Amphibious Construction Battalion One
- Assault Craft Unit One
- Beachmaster Unit One
- Expeditionary Warfare Training Group Pacific
- Explosive Ordnance Disposal Group One
  - Explosive Ordnance Disposal Mobile Unit One
  - Explosive Ordnance Disposal Mobile Unit Three
  - Explosive Ordnance Disposal Operational Support Unit Seven (decommissioned)
- Naval Special Warfare Command
  - Naval Special Warfare Center
- Commander, Naval Special Warfare Group One
  - SEAL Team One
  - SEAL Team Three
  - SEAL Team Five
  - SEAL Team Seven
- Commander, Naval Special Warfare Group 11 (Navy Reserve)
  - SEAL Team 17 (Navy Reserve)
  - SEAL Team 18 (Navy Reserve)
- Naval Special Warfare Group Three
- Special Boat Team 12
- Commander, Tactical Air Control Group One
  - Tactical Air Control Squadron Eleven
  - Tactical Air Control Squadron 1194 (Navy Reserve)
  - Tactical Air Control Squadron Twelve
  - Tactical Air Control Squadron 1294 (Navy Reserve)
- Naval Special Warfare Leadership Education and Development (NLEAD)

== In the media ==
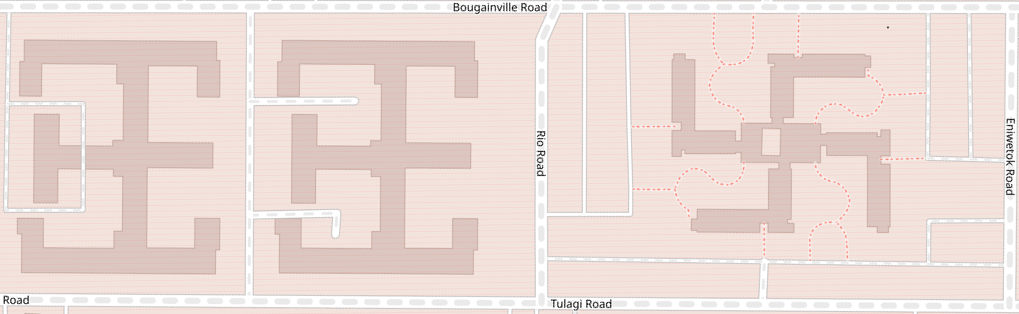
Pictogram-shaped buildings at the base (the upper right corner is true north)

Buildings 320, 321, 322, and 323, at 32.67657°N 117.15827°W, have a swastika-shaped plan view. This went unnoticed by the public from its construction in the 1960s until 2007 when it was spotted in aerial views on Google Earth. Although landscaping and architectural modifications were made to obscure the shape, 2025 imagery, the latest used by Google Earth, shows no substantive change.

== Education ==
The housing on-post is in the Coronado Unified School District, and the zones for Village Elementary School, Coronado Middle School, and Coronado High School.

== See also ==
- California during World War II
