= California State Route 283 =

Highway in California

U.S. Route 101 Business
- Wildwood Avenue
- SR 283/US 101 Bus./Wildwood Avenue highlighted in red

Route information
- Maintained by Caltrans

Major junctions
- South end: US 101 near Scotia
- North end: US 101 in Rio Dell

Location
- Country: United States
- State: California
- Counties: Humboldt

Highway system
- United States Numbered Highway System; List; Special; Divided; State highways in California; Interstate; US; State; Scenic; History; Pre‑1964; Unconstructed; Deleted; Freeways
← SR 282	SR 283	→ SR 284

State Route 283
- Location: Near Scotia–Rio Dell
- Length: 0.356 mi (573 m)
- Existed: 1970 (Note: From US 101)–present

U.S. Route 101 Business is a business loop of U.S. Route 101 that runs along Wildwood Avenue in Rio Dell in Humboldt County, California. Its southernmost section between US 101 near Scotia to the north end of the Eel River Bridge is legally defined as an unsigned state highway, State Route 283 (SR 283). The route was defined in 1970 as a transfer from a realigned US 101 after a freeway bypass was built.

== Route description ==
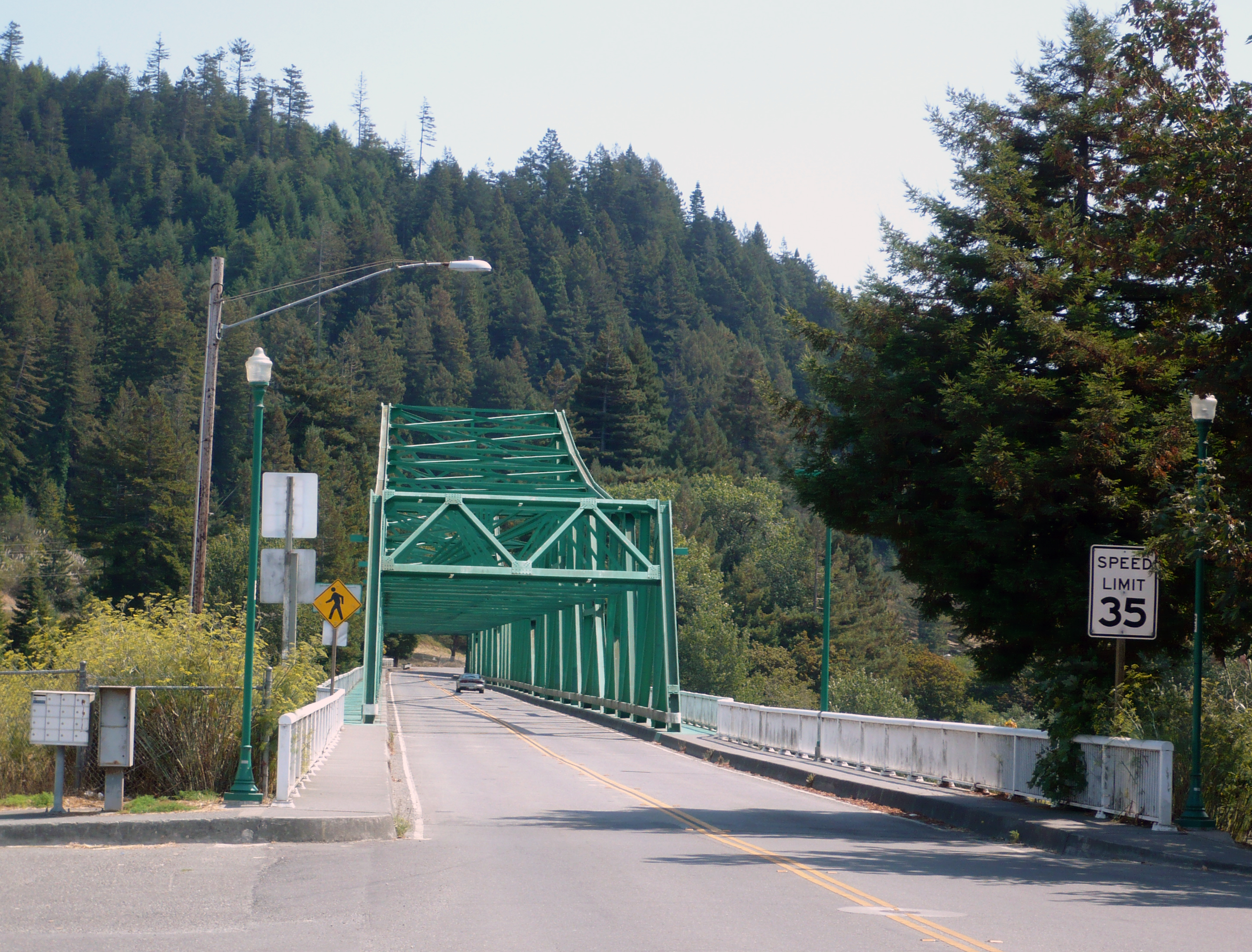
Eagle Prairie Bridge over the Eel River, looking south from Rio Dell towards Scotia

Route 283 is defined in section 583 of the California Streets and Highways Code, and that the highway is "from Route 101 south of Rio Dell to the north end of the Eel River Bridge and Overhead in Rio Dell".

State Route 283 spurs out of US 101 near Scotia, south of Rio Dell, while carrying US 101 Business from that intersection to the Eel River Bridge. After crossing the bridge, SR 283 ends and US 101 Business continues north through the center of Rio Dell to US 101 in the northern part of the city.

SR 283 includes the length of the Eel River Bridge, keeping its maintenance to Caltrans. The bridge itself was built in 1941, when U.S. Route 101 ran through what was then known as Eagle Prairie. In 1977, the bridge was renamed the Albert Stanwood Murphy Memorial Bridge, in honor of the Pacific Lumber Company president who assisted the Save the Redwoods League. In 1990, the bridge was given a second name, the Eagle Prairie Bridge, in honor of the 50th anniversary of the bridge's construction and the 25th anniversary of Rio Dell's incorporation.

SR 283 is not part of the National Highway System, a network of highways that are considered essential to the country's economy, defense, and mobility by the Federal Highway Administration.

== Major intersections ==
Except where prefixed with a letter, postmiles were measured on the road as it was when the route was established, based on the alignment that existed at the time, and do not necessarily reflect current mileage. Postmile prefixes include: R reflecting a realignment in the route since then, M indicating a second realignment, L referring to an overlap due to a correction or change, and T indicating postmiles classified as temporary. Segments that remain unconstructed or have been relinquished to local control may be omitted. The entire route is in Humboldt County.

Location	Postmile	Destinations	Notes
	0.00	US 101 – Eureka	Interchange; south end of US 101 Bus. overlap; south end of SR 283; US 101 exit 679
		Scotia (Main Street)	Former US 101 south
Rio Dell	0.12	Eel River Bridge over Eel River	
Rio Dell	0.36	North end of US 101 Bus. overlap; north end of SR 283	
Rio Dell		Davis Street to US 101	
Rio Dell		US 101	Interchange; north end of US 101 Bus.; US 101 exit 681
1.000 mi = 1.609 km; 1.000 km = 0.621 mi: Concurrency terminus
