= Chilcoot, California =

Unincorporated community in California, United States

Chilcoot
- Unincorporated community
- Location in California Chilcoot (the United States)
- Coordinates: 39°47′52″N 120°08′23″W
- Country: United States
- State: California
- County: Plumas
- Elevation: 5,013 ft (1,528 m)
- ZIP code: 96105

Chilcoot is an unincorporated community in Plumas County, California, United States. It lies at an elevation of 5,013 feet (1,528 m). Chilcoot is located 17 miles (27.4 km) east of Portola.

For census purposes, Chilcoot is included in the census-designated place (CDP) of Chilcoot-Vinton.

The Chilcoot post office opened in 1898, was moved into Lassen County in 1909, and moved back into Plumas County in 1910. Chilcoot may be a Shawnee language name.

== Climate ==
This region experiences warm (but not hot) and dry summers, with no average monthly temperatures above 71.6 °F. According to the Köppen Climate Classification system, Chilcoot has a warm-summer Mediterranean climate, abbreviated "Csb" on climate maps.

== Education ==
Chilcoot is served by the Sierra-Plumas Joint Unified School District.
