= Frenchman Lake (California) =

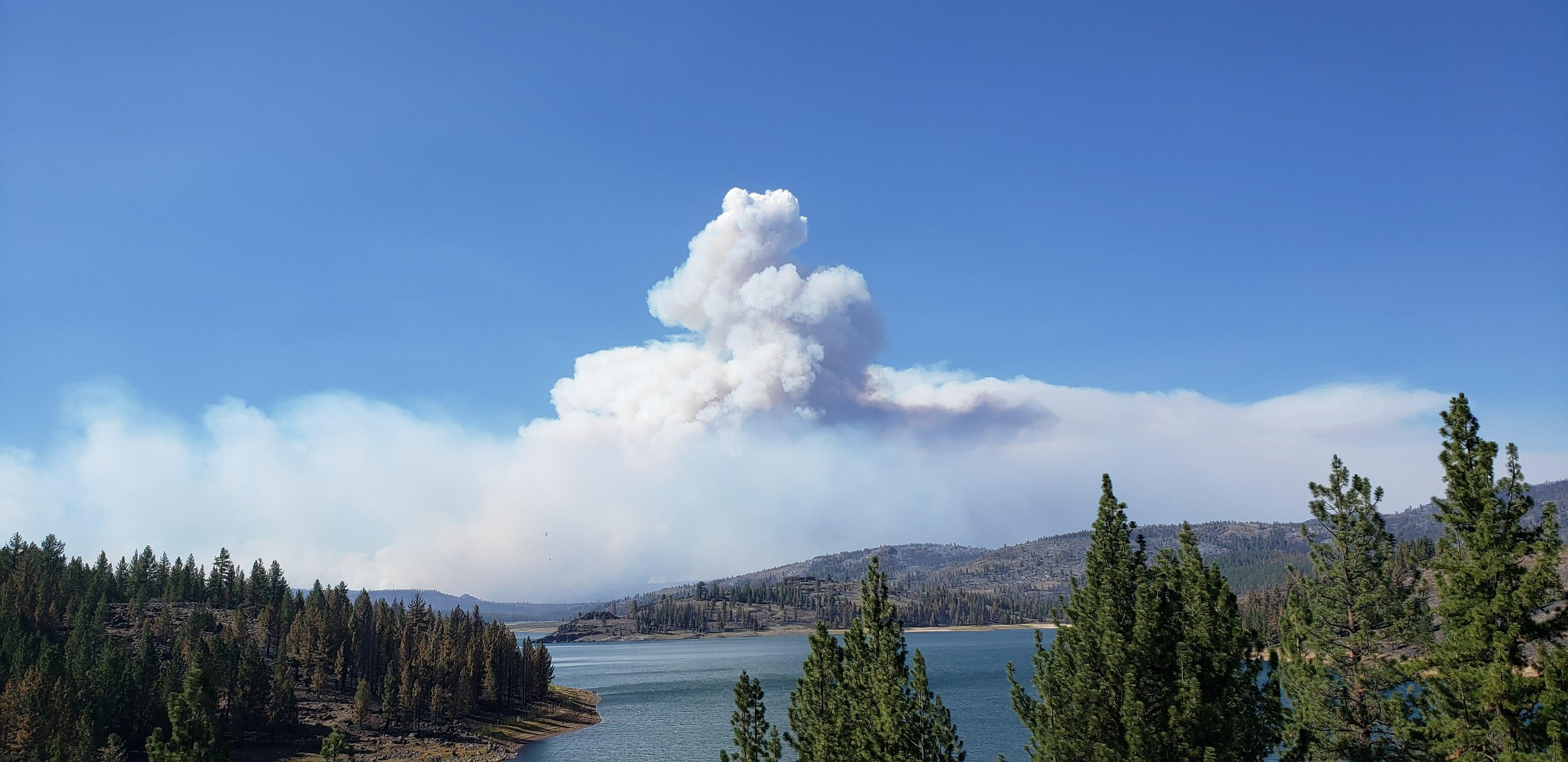
- Frenchman Lake with the Beckwourth Complex Fire in the background in 2021

- Location within California Location within the United States
- Location: Plumas County, California
- Coordinates: 39°53′38″N 120°11′24″W
- Type: Reservoir
- Primary inflows: Little Last Chance Creek
- Primary outflows: Little Last Chance Creek
- Basin countries: United States
- Managing agency: California Department of Water Resources
- Surface area: 1,580 acres (6 km^{2})
- Average depth: 35 ft (11 m)
- Max. depth: 101 ft (31 m)
- Surface elevation: 5,588 ft (1,703 m)
- Website: www.fs.usda.gov/r05/plumas/recreation

Frenchman Lake is a reservoir located in southeastern Plumas County, California. It was created by the damming of Little Last Chance Creek in 1961, as part of the California State Water Project. It was named after its tributary Frenchman Creek, which in turn was named after Claude Francois Seltier, a French immigrant who settled in the area in 1858.

== Frenchman Dam ==
Frenchman Dam was completed in 1961 as part of the California State Water Project, under the authority of the California Department of Water Resources. It is a rock-fill and earthen dam 129 feet (39 m) high, with a length of 720 feet (220 m) at its crest. Normal water storage in the reservoir is 55,477 acre-feet (68,430,000 m^{3}).

== Geography ==
The Frenchman Lake's elevation when full is 5,588 feet (1,703 m) above sea level. The surface area of Frenchman Lake is 1,580 acres (6 km^{2}). The shoreline length is 21 miles (34 km), the maximum depth reaches 101 feet (31 m), averaging 35 feet (11 m). The nearest community is Chilcoot-Vinton, California which is approximately 8 miles (13 km) south.

== National Forest Recreation Area ==
The United States Forest Service administers the Plumas National Forest land surrounding the lake as a National Forest Recreation Area, locally managed as part of the Beckwourth Ranger District. The Frenchman Lake Recreation Area offers a wide variety of summer outdoor experiences including: camping, picnicking, fishing, hunting, boating, jet skiing, mountain biking, swimming and water-skiing. In the winter, ice fishing, snowmobiling and cross-country skiing are favored activities.

Public campgrounds are located on the south shore at Cottonwood Springs, Frenchman, Spring Creek and Big Cove. Additionally there is another campground located below the dam along Little Last Chance Creek.

== See also ==
- List of dams and reservoirs in California
- List of lakes in California
