= Sierra-Plumas Joint Unified School District =

School district in California, United States

Address
- 109 Beckwith Road Loyalton, California, 96118; United States

District information
- Grades: K–12
- Established: 1954; 72 years ago
- Superintendent: Sean Snider
- Schools: 1 high school (7–12), 1 high school (9–12), 1 elementary school (K–6), 1 K–12 school
- NCES District ID: 0636780

Students and staff
- Students: 395 (2020–2021)
- Teachers: 27.95 (FTE)
- Staff: 36.67 (FTE)
- Student–teacher ratio: 14.13:1

Other information
- Website: www.sierracountyschools.org

Sierra-Plumas Joint Unified School District is a public school district based in Sierra County, California, United States. The Sierra-Plumas Joint Unified School District serves all of Sierra County, and the eastern quarter of Plumas County, with headquarters in Loyalton. The District is governed by a five-person Governing Board, each member of which represents a defined geographical area of the District. The District Governing Board also serves as the Sierra County Board of Education.

Within Plumas County, it includes Chilcoot-Vinton.

== History ==
The district was formed in 1954 by amalgamation of districts including the Sierra Valley Joint Union High School District, formed in 1908 out of ten school districts in the region and responsible for creating the first high school in Sierra County, at Loyalton; Butte School District, at Sierra City; and Alta School District, at Goodyears Bar.

== Schools ==
The district operates four schools: the all-grades Downieville School in Downieville and Loyalton Elementary School, Loyalton High School, and Sierra Pass Continuation School in Loyalton. Sean Snider became district superintendent in 2023, succeeding James Berardi.
