= List of Utah railroads =

The following railroads operate in the U.S. state of Utah.

== Common freight carriers ==
- BNSF Railway (BNSF): trackage rights over the UP
- Cando Tooele Railroad
- Salt Lake City Southern Railroad (SL)
- Salt Lake, Garfield and Western Railway (SLGW)
- Savage Bingham and Garfield Railroad (SBG)
- Union Pacific Railroad (UP): Cache Valley, Cane Creek, Cedar City, Comstock, Evanston, Green River, Lakeside, Lynndyl, Malad, Ogden, Pleasant Valley, Provo, Salt Lake, Shafter, Sharp, and Sunnyside Subdivisions
- Utah Railway (UTAH)
- Utah Central Railway (UCRY)

== Private freight carriers ==
- Deseret Power Railway
- Kennecott Utah Copper

== Passenger carriers ==
- Amtrak (AMTK): California Zephyr
- Heber Valley Railroad
- Utah Transit Authority FrontRunner & TRAX
- Wild Kingdom Train

== Defunct railroads ==
Name	Mark	System (Note: This is one or more of the Class I railroads that the railroad became part of, if any.)	From	To	Successor	Notes
American Fork Railroad			1872	1878	N/A	
Ballard and Thompson Railroad		DRGW	1911	1949	N/A	
Bingham Canon and Camp Floyd Railroad		DRGW	1872	1881	Denver and Rio Grande Western Railway	
Bingham Central Railway		Ohio Copper Company	1907	1924	Lost common carrier railroad status after 1924, continued as private mining railroad until Mascotte Tunnel closure.	Two foot gauge
Bingham and Garfield Railway	B&G, BG		1908	1948	Kennecott Utah Copper	
Cache Valley Railroad			1918	1927	N/A	
California Short Line Railway		DRGW	1882	1889	San Pete Valley Railway	
Carbon County Railway		DRGW	1899	1900	Rio Grande Western Railway	
Carbon County Railway	CBC		1922	1982	N/A	
Castle Valley Railroad		DRGW	1909	1914	Southern Utah Railroad	
Castle Valley Railway		DRGW	1901	1908	Denver and Rio Grande Railroad	
Central Pacific Railroad		SP	1862	1899	Central Pacific Railway	
Central Pacific Railway		SP	1899	1959	Southern Pacific Company	
Coalville and Echo Railroad		UP	1869	1874	Summit County Railroad	
Copper Belt Railroad		DRGW	1901	1908	Denver and Rio Grande Railroad	
Deep Creek Railroad		WP	1916	1939	N/A	
Denver and Rio Grande Railroad	D&RG	DRGW	1908	1921	Denver and Rio Grande Western Railroad	
Denver and Rio Grande Western Railroad	D&RGW, DRGW	DRGW	1920	1997	Union Pacific Railroad	
Denver and Rio Grande Western Railway		DRGW	1881	1889	Rio Grande Western Railway	
Echo and Park City Railway		UP	1881	1899	Union Pacific Railroad	
Eureka Hill Railway			1907	1928	N/A	
Goshen Valley Railroad		DRGW	1918	1947	Denver and Rio Grande Western Railroad	
Grass Creek Terminal Railway		UP	1894	1910	N/A	
Helper Western Railway			1909	1920	National Coal Railway	
Inland Railway			1916	1924	N/A	
Kenilworth and Helper Railroad		DRGW	1911	1926	N/A	
Little Cottonwood Transportation Company			1916	1925	N/A	
Los Angeles and Salt Lake Railroad	SLR	UP	1916	1987	Union Pacific Railroad	
Malad Valley Railroad		UP	1902	1910	Oregon Short Line Railroad	
National Coal Railway			1920	1954	N/A	
New East Tintic Railway		UP	1896	1903	San Pedro, Los Angeles and Salt Lake Railroad	
Newhouse, Copper Gulch and Sevier Lake Railroad			1904	1927	N/A	
Ogden and Syracuse Railway		UP	1887	1889	Oregon Short Line and Utah Northern Railway	
Ogden Union Railway and Depot Company	OURD	DRGW/ SP/ UP	1888			Still exists as a nonoperating subsidiary of the Union Pacific Railroad
Oregon Short Line Railroad		UP	1897	1987	Union Pacific Railroad	
Oregon Short Line Railway		UP	1882	1889	Oregon Short Line and Utah Northern Railway	
Oregon Short Line and Utah Northern Railway		UP	1889	1897	Oregon Short Line Railroad	
Rio Grande Western Railway		DRGW	1889	1908	Denver and Rio Grande Railroad	
St. John and Ophir Railroad			1912	1928	N/A	
Salt Lake and Alta Railroad			1913	1917	N/A	
Salt Lake City Union Depot and Railroad Company		DRGW/ WP	1907	1978	N/A	
Salt Lake and Eastern Railway		DRGW	1888	1897	Utah Central Railroad	
Salt Lake and Fort Douglas Railway		DRGW	1883	1897	Utah Central Railroad	
Salt Lake and Los Angeles Railway	SL&L		1892	1916	Salt Lake, Garfield and Western Railway	
Salt Lake and Mercur Railroad			1894	1913	N/A	
Salt Lake and Park City Railway		DRGW	1881	1881	Denver and Rio Grande Western Railway	
Salt Lake, Sevier Valley and Pioche Railroad		UP	1872	1874	Utah Western Railway	
Salt Lake and Western Railway		UP	1881	1889	Oregon Short Line and Utah Northern Railway	
Saltair Railway			1891	1892	Salt Lake and Los Angeles Railway	
San Pedro, Los Angeles and Salt Lake Railroad		UP	1901	1916	Los Angeles and Salt Lake Railroad	
San Pete Valley Railway		DRGW	1874	1908	Denver and Rio Grande Railroad	
Sevier Railway		DRGW	1891	1908	Denver and Rio Grande Railroad	
Sevier Valley Railway		DRGW	1880	1881	Denver and Rio Grande Western Railway	
Southern Pacific Company	SP	SP	1885	1969	Southern Pacific Transportation Company	
Southern Pacific Transportation Company	SP	SP	1969	1998	Union Pacific Railroad	
Southern Utah Railroad		DRGW	1907	1917	N/A	
Summit County Railroad		UP	1871	1880	Echo and Park City Railway	
Tintic Range Railway		DRGW	1891	1908	Denver and Rio Grande Railroad	
Tooele Valley Railway	TOV		1908	1981	N/A	
Uintah Railway			1903	1939	N/A	
Union Pacific Railroad		UP	1862	1880	Union Pacific Railway	
Union Pacific Railway		UP	1880	1898	Union Pacific Railroad	
Utah Central Railroad		DRGW	1897	1908	Denver and Rio Grande Railroad	
Utah Central Railroad		UP	1869	1881	Utah Central Railway	
Utah Central Railway		DRGW	1890	1897	Utah Central Railroad	
Utah Central Railway		UP	1881	1889	Oregon Short Line and Utah Northern Railway	
Utah Coal Railway			1912	1912	Utah Railway	
Utah Eastern Railroad		UP	1879	1887	Echo and Park City Railway	
Utah Eastern Railway		DRGW	1897	1900	Rio Grande Western Railway	
Utah and Nevada Railway		UP	1881	1889	Oregon Short Line and Utah Northern Railway	
Utah Northern Railroad		UP	1872	1878	Utah and Northern Railway	
Utah and Northern Railway		UP	1878	1889	Oregon Short Line and Utah Northern Railway	
Utah and Pacific Railroad		UP	1898	1903	San Pedro, Los Angeles and Salt Lake Railroad	
Utah and Pleasant Valley Railway		DRGW	1875	1882	Denver and Rio Grande Western Railway	
Utah Southern Railroad		UP	1871	1881	Utah Central Railway	
Utah Southern Railroad Extension Company		UP	1874	1881	Utah Central Railway	
Utah Terminal Railway			1920	1921	Utah Railway	
Utah Western Railway		DRGW	1889	1890	Utah Central Railway	
Utah Western Railway		UP	1874	1880	Utah and Nevada Railway	
Wasatch and Jordan Valley Railroad		DRGW	1872	1881	Denver and Rio Grande Western Railway	
Western Pacific Railroad	WP	WP	1916	1987	Union Pacific Railroad	
Western Pacific Railway		WP	1903	1916	Western Pacific Railroad	

Private freight carriers

- Boston Consolidated Mining Company
- Crescent Mining Company
- Independent Coal and Coke Company

Passenger carriers

- Alta Scenic Railway

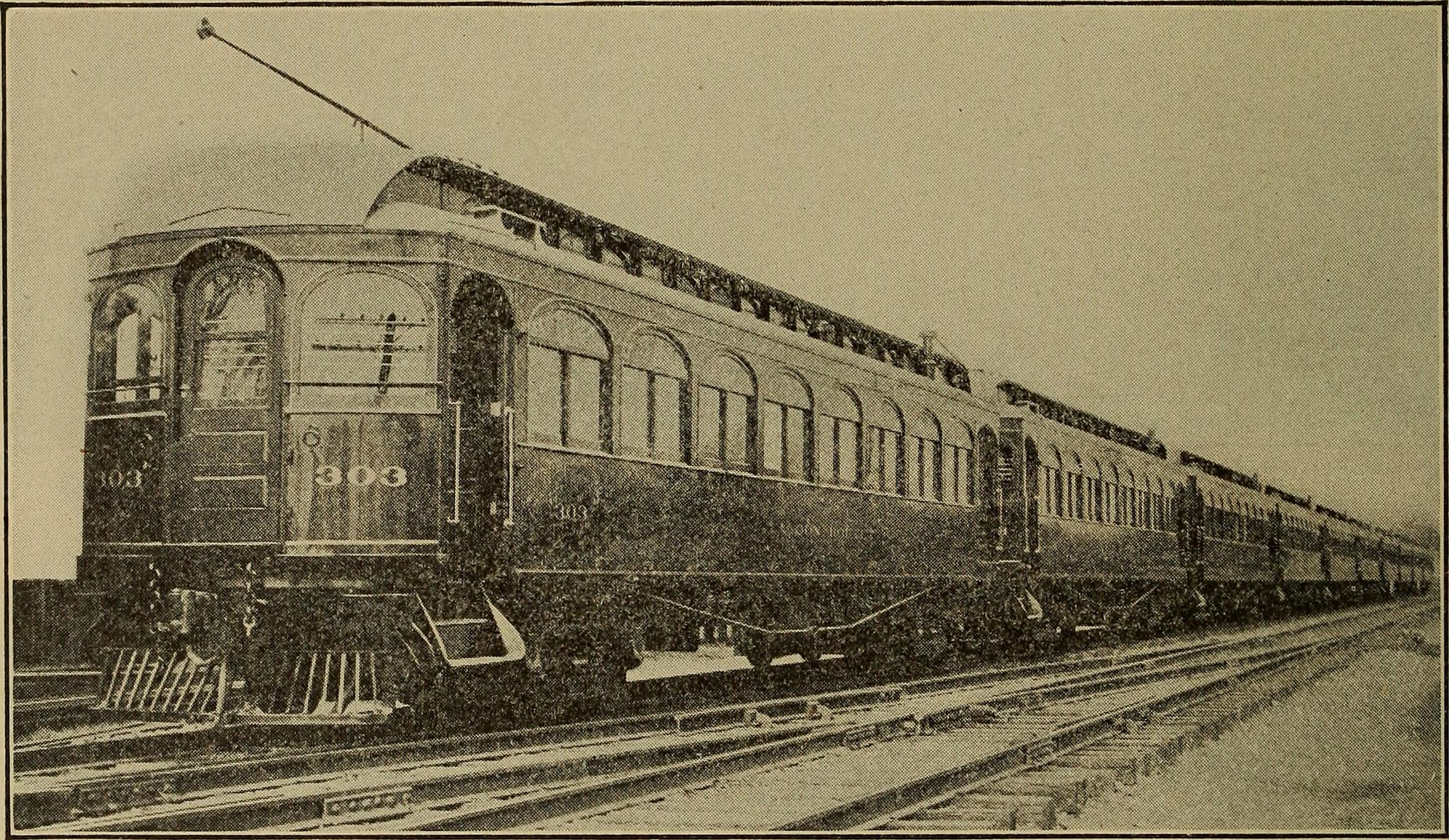
Electric trains of the Salt Lake and Ogden Railway, ca. 1910

Electric

- Bamberger Railroad (B)
- Bamberger Electric Railroad (BE)
- Bingham Central Railway
- Consolidated Railway and Power Company
- East Bench Street Railway
- Emigration Canyon Railroad
- Great Salt Lake and Hot Springs Railway
- Logan Rapid Transit Company
- Ogden City Railway
- Ogden Electric Railway
- Ogden and Hot Springs Railway
- Ogden, Logan and Idaho Railway (OL&I)
- Ogden and Northwestern Railroad
- Ogden Rapid Transit Company
- Popperton Place and Fort Douglas Rapid Transit Company
- Salt Lake City Railroad
- Salt Lake, Garfield and Western Railway (SLGW)
- Salt Lake Light and Traction Company
- Salt Lake and Ogden Railway
- Salt Lake Rapid Transit Company
- Salt Lake Terminal Company
- Salt Lake and Utah Railroad (SL&U, SLU)
- Salt Lake and Utah Valley Railway
- Utah Idaho Central Railroad (UIC)
- Utah Idaho Central Railway (UIC)
- Utah Light and Railway Company
- Utah Light and Traction Company
- Utah Rapid Transit Company
- West Side Railway
- West Side Rapid Transit Company
