= Bingham Canyon Reclamation Project =

Proposed work of art by Robert Smithson

Coordinates: 40°31′21″N 112°09′07″W

The Bingham Canyon Reclamation Project, in Utah, was a 1973 site-specific mine reclamation design that artist Robert Smithson submitted to the mine's management company, Kennecott Copper Corporation. The design re-imagined Bingham Canyon Mine, the world's largest open pit mine, as a monumental work of land art.

== The mine's beginnings ==
Sixty million years ago, a gigantic explosion from within the earth blasted through the area's sedimentary layers to the surface. The incoming flow of magma filled the cracks and fissures in the stone and formed into a plug of molten rock. Beginning in 1848, the resultant metallic veins were mined for gold, silver, copper, and molybdenite.

Investments in the mine by the Guggenheim family contributed to the early growth of the mine. The town of Bingham, Utah, was eventually swallowed by the expanding man-made chasm, which would come to be known as "The Richest Hole on Earth" and the largest man-made excavation in the world. The mine was active when Smithson submitted his reclamation design and it remains so today.

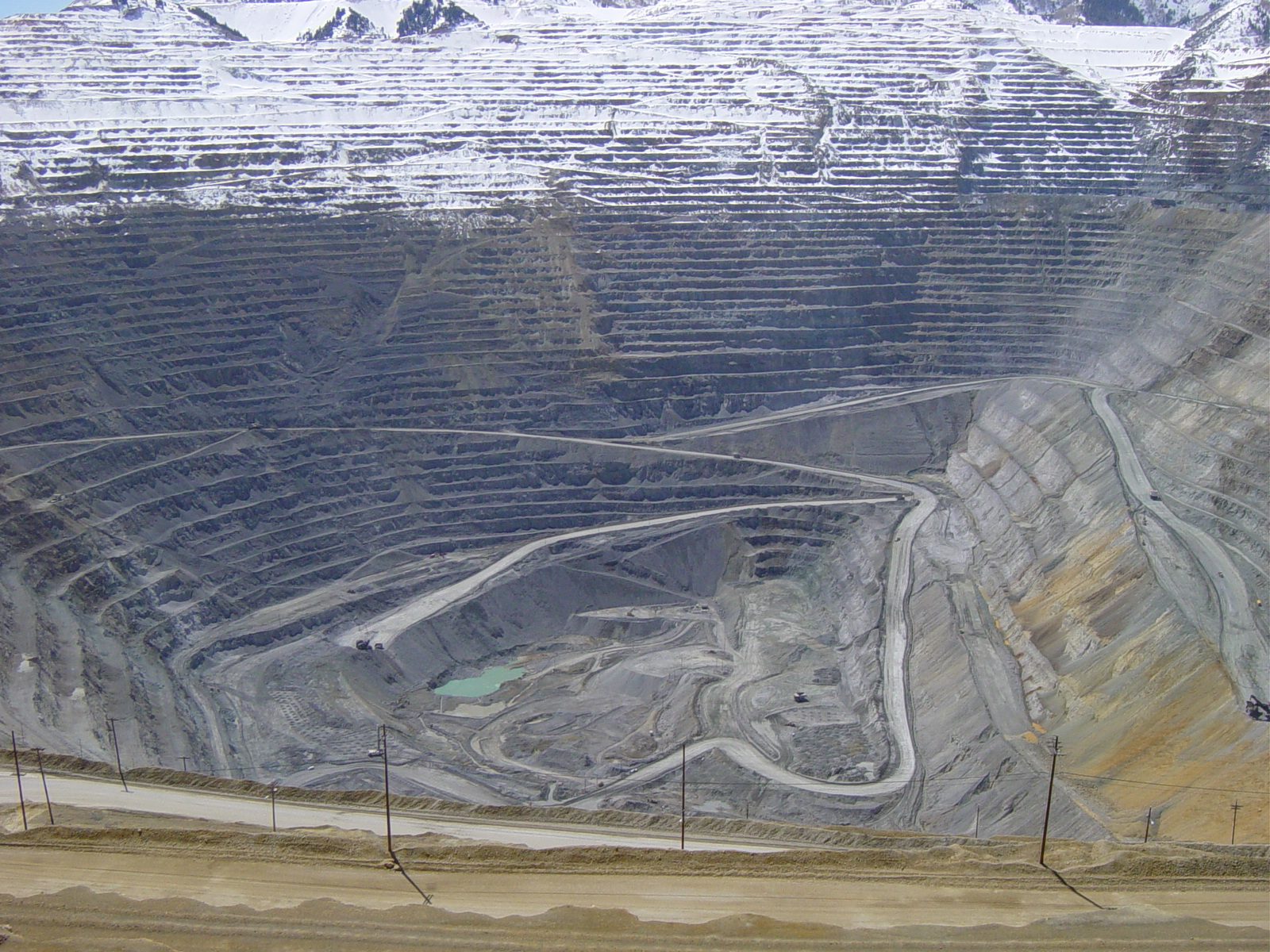
Bingham Canyon Mine as it appeared in 2005.

== The Clean Air Act Extension of 1970 and push for remediation ==
In 1970, cultural changes following the civil rights movement and federal policies such as the Clean Air Act Extension led to a growing environmental consciousness in the United States and placed pressure on mining companies to devise methods of controlling the toxic by-products of extraction. At the time of Smithson's unsolicited proposal in 1973, Kennecott Copper Corporation was contemplating different remediation projects in anticipation of federally imposed regulations.

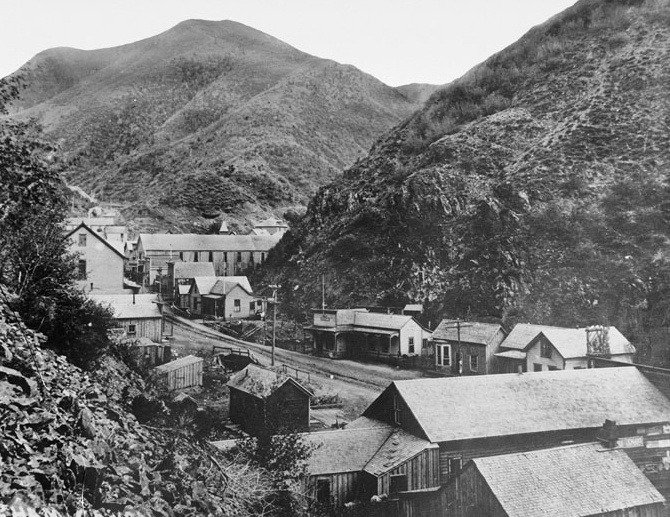
The town of Bingham, Utah in 1914.

== Proposal ==
The proposal to Kennecott Copper Corporation was one of a portfolio that Smithson submitted to mining companies in the early 1970s. He hoped to capitalize on the mining companies' growing receptiveness to reclamation and remediation projects that dealt with waste land in new, innovative ways. Also, the companies possessed the sort of earth-moving equipment necessary for Smithson's increasingly ambitious land art projects since the late 1960s, such as 1970's Spiral Jetty.

For the proposal, Smithson submitted a design in the form of a photostat with plastic overlay on which he marked with wax pencil. The mine's massive spiraling cavity was already sympathetic to Smithson's aesthetics and he did not plan to alter it. At the circular bottom of the open pit, the proposal called for four dividing crescent rises. During heavy rains, these would turn into jetties rising from the collected pool of water.

Smithson designed the collected pool of water at the bottom as the most striking color element in the pit because it would be bright yellow due to the toxic runoff, or acid rock drainage (also known as yellow boy). Smithson further suggested that the circular base of the pit rotate, invoking a 19th-century cyclorama, so that the visiting pilgrim would be able to observe a 360 degree view of the man-made spiraling canyon while standing in one position.

== Response from Kennecott ==
Kennecott did not immediately respond to the proposal, and the artist's untimely death on July 20, 1973 effectively brought an end to any potential negotiations between mining corporation and artist.

The project, had it been realized, would have been by far the largest of Smithson's land works.

== The mine today ==
The Bingham Canyon Open Pit Copper Mine is on the List of National Historic Landmarks. The mine claims success in ongoing reclamation efforts. It is open to visitors from April to October, weather permitting.

== See also ==
- Roden Crater
- City (artwork)
- Rio Tinto Group, owners of Bingham Copper Mine
