= Lark, Utah =

Lark
- Ghost town
- Location within Utah Location within the United States
- Coordinates: 40°31′30″N 112°05′47″W
- Country: United States
- State: Utah
- County: Salt Lake
- Founded: 1866
- Abandoned: 1978
- Named for: A prospector named Lark
- Elevation: 5,541 ft (1,689 m)
- GNIS feature ID: 1437617

Lark is a ghost town located 4 miles (6.4 km) west of Herriman in the Oquirrh Mountains of southwest Salt Lake County, Utah in the United States. Lark was founded and settled by miners due to its location nearby several, now defunct, copper mines.

== History ==
The discovery of gold in Bingham Canyon in 1863 brought a rush of prospectors, two of whom were named Dalton and Lark. Settlements with these names grew up around the mining claims. Eventually the settlement of Dalton was merged into Lark. The town of Lark was officially established January 3, 1866.

The town had enough Latter-day Saint residents by 1918 to be made a ward, but by 1923, the ward was reduced to a branch. It had 234 members in 1930.

By 1929, Lark was a company town of the United States Smelting and Refining Company, which expanded the town through the 1940s and 1950s. At its peak, the population exceeded 800. Then the nearby non-copper mines began to close, and the town went into decline. The last silver, zinc, and lead mine closed about 1971. In 1972, Kennecott Copper bought the land, and on December 14, 1977, the company announced the termination of the 51 families' leases on the land where homes had been built, and gave them notices of eviction. The company wanted the land to dump large quantities of overburden from nearby Bingham Canyon Mine. The population was 591, and Kennecott helped move people and some homes, even preparing a subdivision in nearby Copperton. By 1978, Lark was dismantled.

Lark's most famous citizen was Vina Fay Wray, who portrayed Ann Darrow in the 1933 movie King Kong. As a child Wray lived in two locations in Salt Lake City, and also in Lark, before her family moved to Los Angeles.

== See also ==
- List of ghost towns in Utah
