= Bingham Canyon, Utah =

Bingham Canyon
- Ghost town
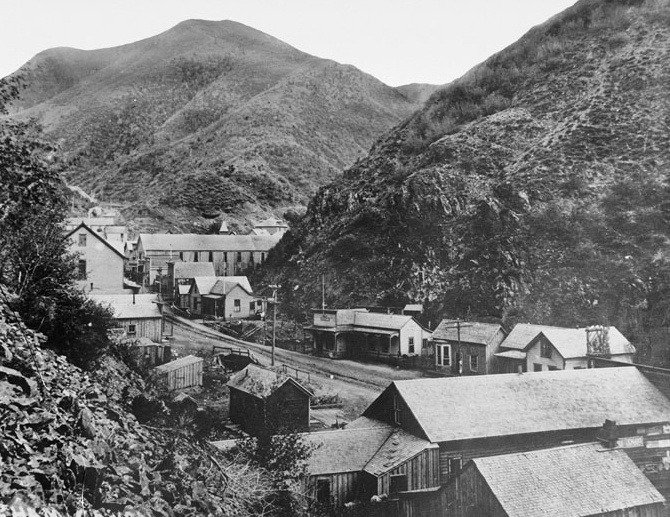
- Bingham Canyon in 1914

- Location within Utah Location within the United States
- Coordinates: 40°33′30″N 112°07′50″W
- Country: United States
- State: Utah
- County: Salt Lake
- Founded: 1863
- Incorporated: February 29, 1904
- Became a city: May 23, 1938
- Abandoned: 1972
- Named for: Thomas and Sanford Bingham
- Elevation: 5,940 ft (1,810 m)
- GNIS feature ID: 1425580

Bingham Canyon was a city formerly located in southwestern Salt Lake County, Utah, United States, in a narrow canyon on the eastern face of the Oquirrh Mountains. The Bingham Canyon area boomed during the first years of the twentieth century, as rich copper deposits in the canyon began to be developed, and at its peak the city had approximately 15,000 residents. The success of the local mines eventually proved to be the town's undoing, however: by the mid-twentieth century, the huge open-pit Bingham Canyon Mine began encroaching on the land of the community, causing residents to relocate. By the 1970s, almost the entirety of the town had been devoured by the mine, and the few remaining residents voted to disincorporate and abandon the community. No trace of Bingham Canyon remains today.

== History ==
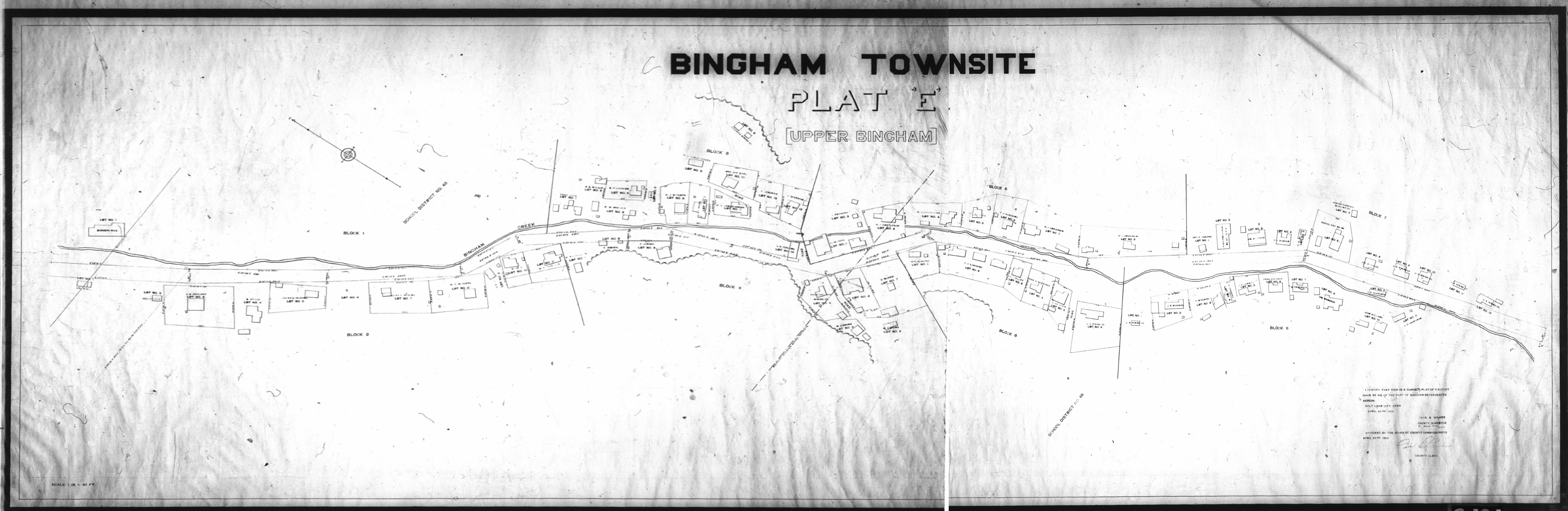
Plat E, Bingham Townsite Map, 1900 from the Salt Lake County Recorder's Bingham Canyon Maps

The geographic feature known as Bingham Canyon received its name from the location's two first settlers, the brothers Thomas and Sanford Bingham, who arrived in the canyon in 1848. Initially, the area was utilized for livestock grazing and logging, but the region's economic focus changed with the 1863 discovery of rich gold and silver ore bodies in the canyon. Mining activity in Bingham Canyon boomed after the Bingham Canyon and Camp Floyd Rail Road completed a line to the canyon in 1873, and as the region grew the focus shifted to the high-quality copper ores in the district. As the mines grew, the town of Bingham also expanded, spreading along the narrow and steep canyon floor below the mines.

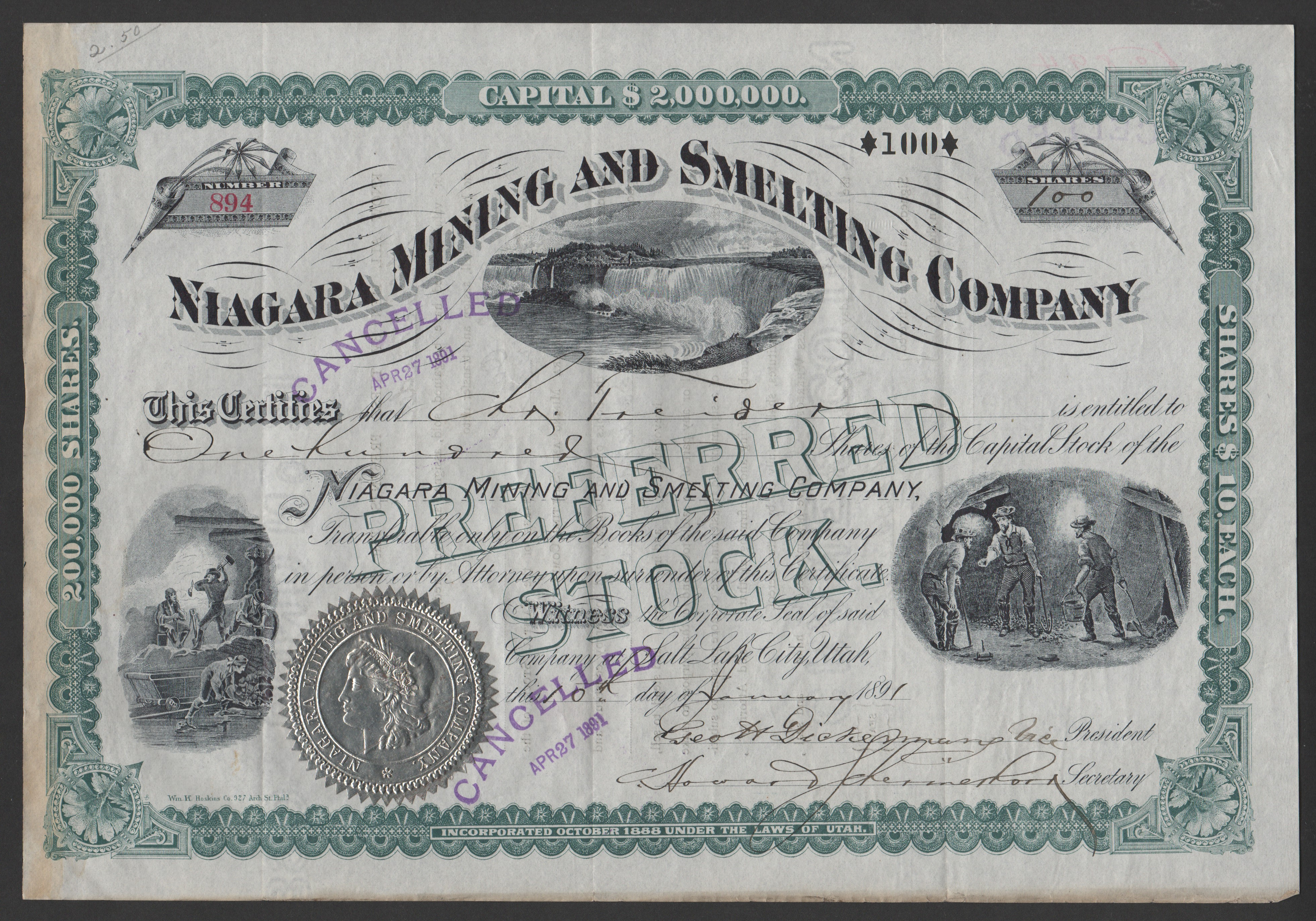
Share of the Niagara Mining and Smelting Company, issued 10 January 1891. This company had mines at Bingham.

The Bingham Canyon mines experienced their greatest boom during the first years of the twentieth century, as the district's smaller mines were consolidated under large corporate ownership. The most significant development occurred in 1903, when Daniel C. Jackling organized the Utah Copper Company to begin surface mining at Bingham Canyon. The Utah Copper Company's mine prospered, and this brought a tremendous influx of new residents into the canyon. The town of Bingham Canyon was officially incorporated on February 29, 1904.

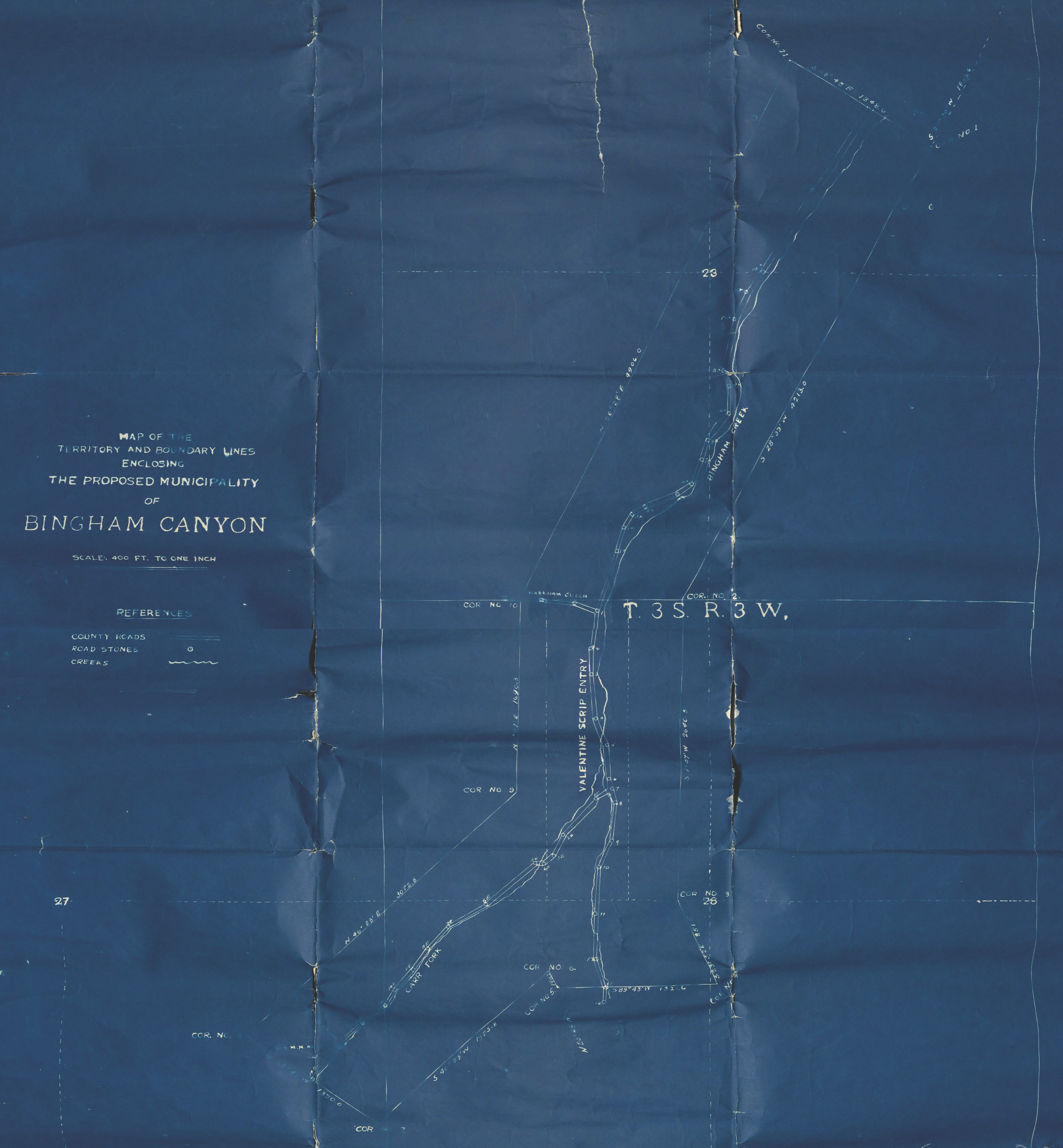
Plat Map of the proposed Bingham Canyon town when the town filed for incorporation with Salt Lake County,1904.

Petition of the Electors of Bingham for Incorporation for the Town of Bingham Canyon, submitted to the Salt Lake County Commission, January 2, 1904.

By the 1920s, the city of Bingham Canyon was at its peak, with perhaps 15,000 inhabitants. Urban development spread for some seven miles along the single, narrow road winding up the steep canyon floor.

As with many western mining towns, the Bingham Canyon area evolved into a collection of diverse neighborhoods, many with pronounced ethnic affiliations. Many Scandinavians lived in the Carr Fork area, while southern and eastern Europeans congregated in Highland Boy, which was in another branch canyon toward the top of the main city. As the mainstreet in the bottom of the canyon grew, Copperfield became the name of the upper section of the main town. Bingham itself attracted British, French, Irish, Puerto Rican, Mexican, and other immigrants and ethnicities. Numerous other small neighborhoods and communities also existed. Most took the name of the mine where they were located. Commercial, Boston Con, and "the Niagara" were the first three communities to be mined away or covered, as the last one was by Galena Gulch waste dumps. Others were the Galena, Old Jordan, and Silver Shield (these three found in Galena Gulch), along with Niagara. Telegraph was in the upper part of the canyon, along with Copperfield, which was threatened when the mining excavating was expanded and a long one-way tunnel was built before 1940 to allow traffic to reach the upper communities. Many names were colorful: Terrace Heights, Dinkeyville, Jap Camp, and Greek camp were sections of Copperfield. The Frisco, Yampa, Phoenix, and Apex were in Carr Fork along with Highland Boy. Further down the canyon were Markham, Freeman, and Frog Town (lower Bingham).

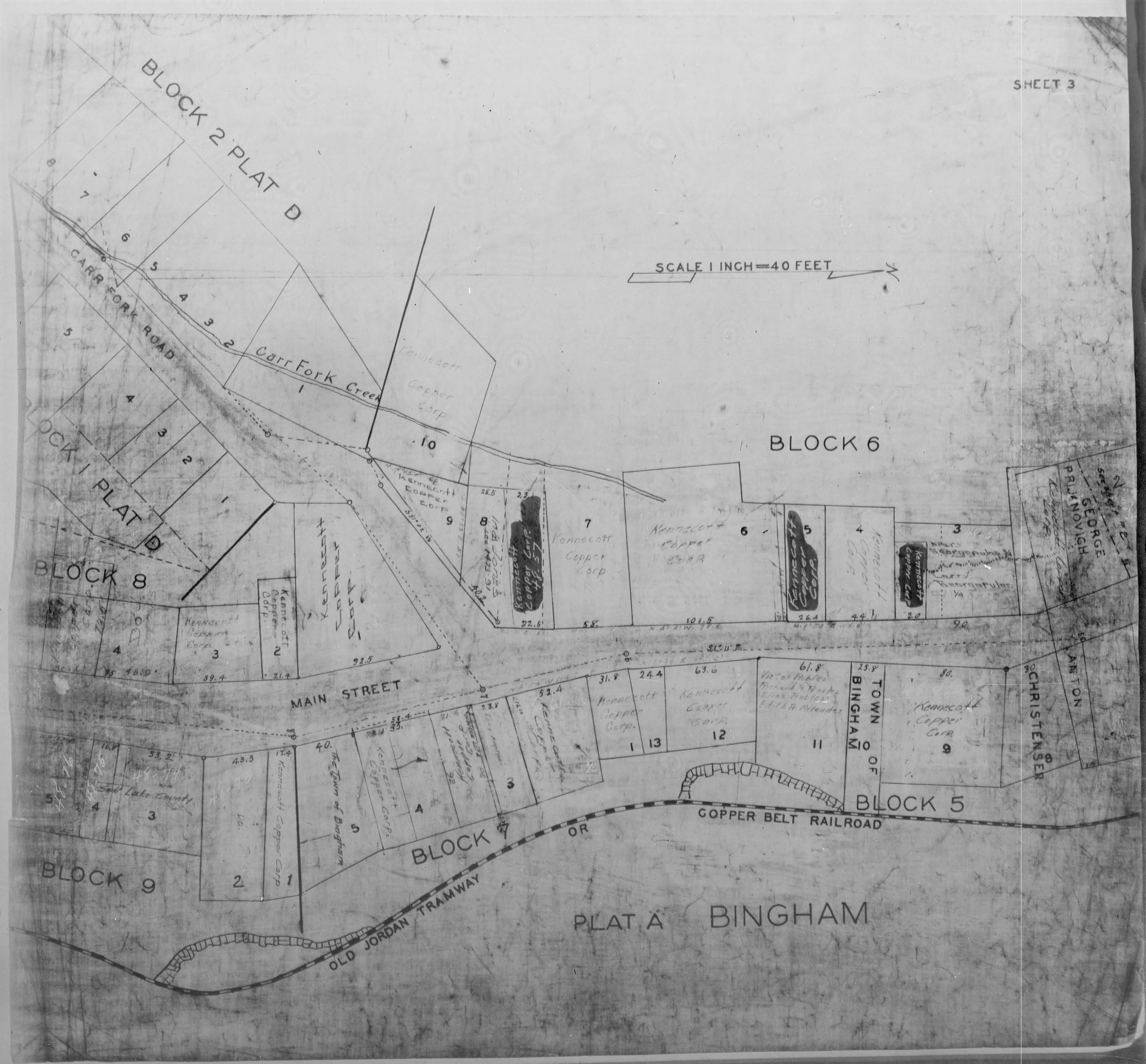
A plat of Bingham Canyon showing Main St. circa 1962.

The size and importance of the Bingham community began to fade as early as the 1920s. The canyon's difficult geography made urban development difficult, while exposing the town to the hazards of fire and avalanche. The first effort to reduce settlement in the canyon came in 1926, when Utah Copper established the town of Copperton on the flats east of the canyon mouth. This was a lovely community with many copper products used in the building of the houses, and the low rent encouraged company employees to live there. In 1956, Kennecott sold the homes to employees for $4,800 to $6,000. Increasing mechanization at the mine also reduced local employment—and hence, Bingham Canyon's population.

On 17 February 1926, seventy-nine people were killed when a snow avalanche destroyed a mining camp in the area.

By the 1930s it was becoming apparent that the most significant threat to the town of Bingham was the mine itself, whose ever-expanding open pit began encroaching on lands formerly occupied by miners' neighborhoods. The mine continued to eat away at Bingham throughout the middle years of the twentieth century, and by 1971 little of the town remained. That November, Bingham Canyon's 31 remaining residents voted 11–2 to disincorporate the town, and the last buildings at Bingham were razed in 1972. Today, most of the land once occupied by Bingham has been consumed by the Bingham Canyon Mine.

Panorama of Bingham Canyon, 1925. Photo courtesy of Utah State Historical Society. Full-size image

== Notable people ==
- Keith Conners, psychologist, best known for establishing the first standards for the diagnosis of attention deficit hyperactivity disorder (ADHD)
- David Daniel Marriott, former U.S. Representative
- John Saltas, founder of alternative weekly Salt Lake City newspaper Salt Lake City Weekly

== See also ==
- List of ghost towns in Utah

== Bibliography ==
- Carr, Stephen L. The Historical Guide to Utah Ghost Towns. Salt Lake City: Western Epics, 1972. ISBN 978-0-914740-30-8.
- Sillitoe, Linda. A History of Salt Lake County. Salt Lake City: Utah State Historical Society, 1996. ISBN 0-913738-04-2.
