= Artificial structures visible from space =

Human-made things that can be seen from space

Artificial structures visible from space without magnification include highways, dams, and cities.

Whether an object is visible depends significantly on the height above sea level from where it is observed. The Kármán line, at 100 kilometres (62 mi), is accepted by the World Air Sports Federation, an international standard-setting and record-keeping body for aeronautics and astronautics, as the boundary between the Earth's atmosphere and outer space. However, astronauts typically orbit the Earth at several hundreds of kilometres; the ISS, for example, orbits at about 420 km (260 mi) above the Earth, and the Moon orbits at about 380,000 km (240,000 mi) away.

== Examples ==
From US Space Shuttles, which typically orbited at around 135 mi (217 km), cities were easily distinguishable from surrounding countryside. Using binoculars, astronauts could even see roads, dams, harbors, even large vehicles such as ships and planes. At night, cities are also easily visible from the higher orbit of the ISS.

Metropolitan areas are clearly visible at night, particularly in industrialized countries, due to a multitude of street lights and other light sources in urban areas (see light pollution).

=== Cooling pond of Chernobyl ===
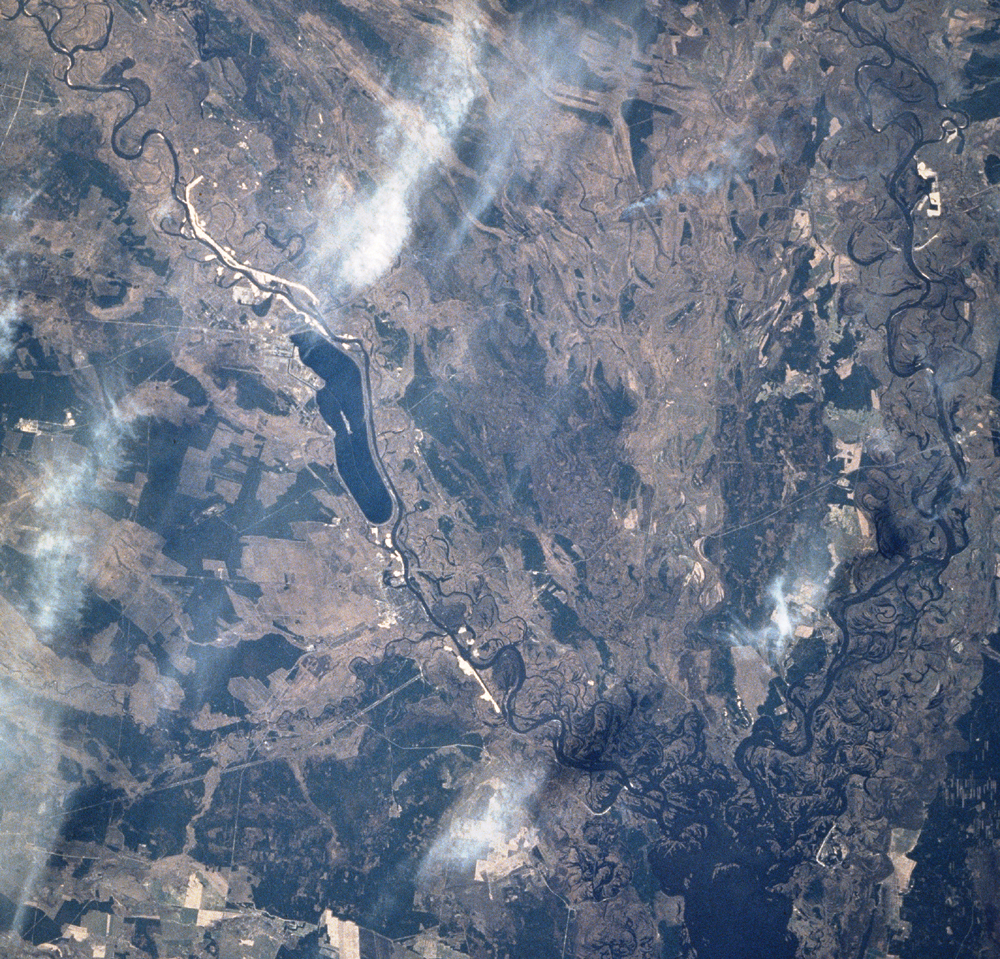
The region around the Chernobyl nuclear power plant, as seen from the Russian space station Mir in 1997

The 10-kilometre (6.2 mi) long cooling pond of the Chernobyl Nuclear Power Plant is visible from space. In April 1997 it was photographed from the Mir space station, which was in orbit somewhere between 296 km (184 mi) and 421 km (262 mi).

=== The greenhouses of Almería ===
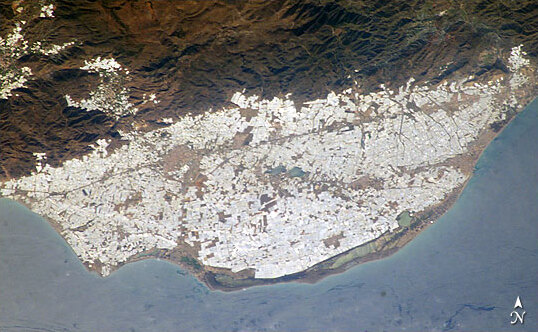
Greenhouses in the province of Almería, Andalucía, Spain

The greenhouse complex that covers about 26 thousand hectares (64 thousand acres; 100 square miles) in the province of Almería, Andalucía, Spain, is visible from space. It is sometimes referred to as the "Plastic sea" ("Mar de plástico" in Spanish) due to the high concentration of these greenhouse structures.

This area produces much of the fruit and vegetables that are sold in the rest of Spain and Europe. Apart from the area depicted in the photo, other zones of the province of Almería (and also the south of Spain) have large concentrations of white-plastic greenhouses too.

=== Bingham Canyon Mine ===
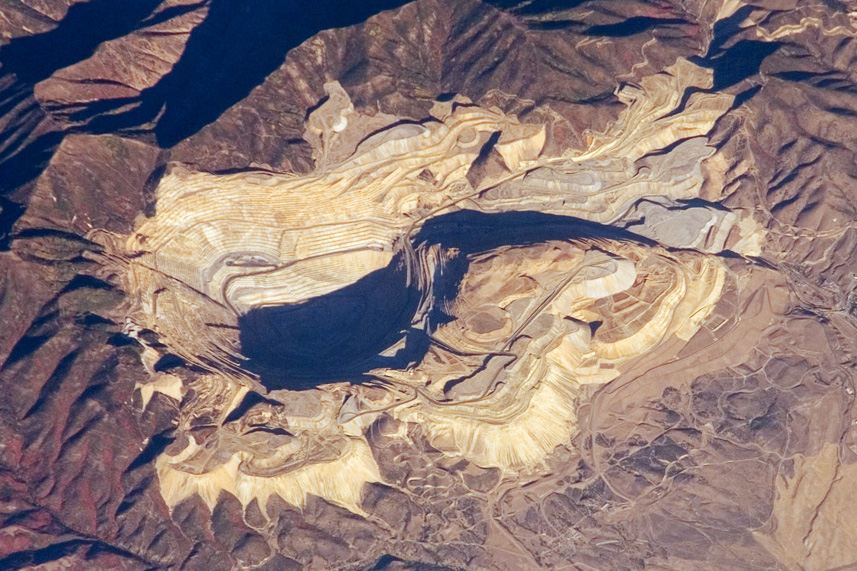
Bingham Canyon Mine near Salt Lake City, Utah, from the International Space Station in 2007

The Bingham Canyon Mine, more commonly known as Kennecott Copper Mine, is an open-pit mining operation extracting a large porphyry copper deposit southwest of Salt Lake City, Utah, in the Oquirrh Mountains. The mine is the largest human-made excavation in the world.

== Misconceptions ==
=== The Great Wall of China ===
The claim that the Great Wall of China is the only man-made object visible from the Moon or outer space has been debunked many times, but remains a common misconception in popular culture. According to astronauts Eugene Cernan and Ed Lu, the Great Wall is visible from the lower part of low Earth orbit, but only under very favorable conditions.

Different claims were historically made for the factoid that the Great Wall is visible from the Moon. William Stukeley mentioned this claim in his letter dated 1754, and Henry Norman made the same claim in 1895. The issue of "canals" on Mars was prominent in the late 19th century and may have led to the belief that long, thin objects were visible from space. A viewer would need visual acuity 17 000 times better than the norm to see the Great Wall from the Moon.

The centimetre-band Spaceborne Imaging Radar of STS-59 and STS-68 was able to detect not only the Great Wall but also invisible buried segments of it.

== Theoretical calculation of visibility from the ISS ==
The human naked eye has an angular resolution of approximately 280 microradians (μrad) (approx 0.016° or 1 minute of arc), and the ISS targets an altitude of 400 km. Using basic trigonometric relations, this means that an astronaut on the ISS with 20/20 vision could potentially detect objects that are 112 m or greater in all dimensions. However, since this would be at the absolute limit of the resolution, objects on the order of 100 m would appear as unidentifiable specks, if not rendered invisible due to other factors, such as atmospheric conditions or poor contrast. For readability of text from the ISS, using the same trigonometric principles and a recommended character size of about 18 arcminutes, or about 5,000 μrad, each letter would need to be about 2 km (1.3 mi) in size for clear legibility in good conditions.

== See also ==
- First images of Earth from space
- Naked-eye planets
- Deck the Halls, a 2006 film that features a man who attempts to get his Christmas lights display visible from space
