= Factoid =

Invented claim or trivial fact

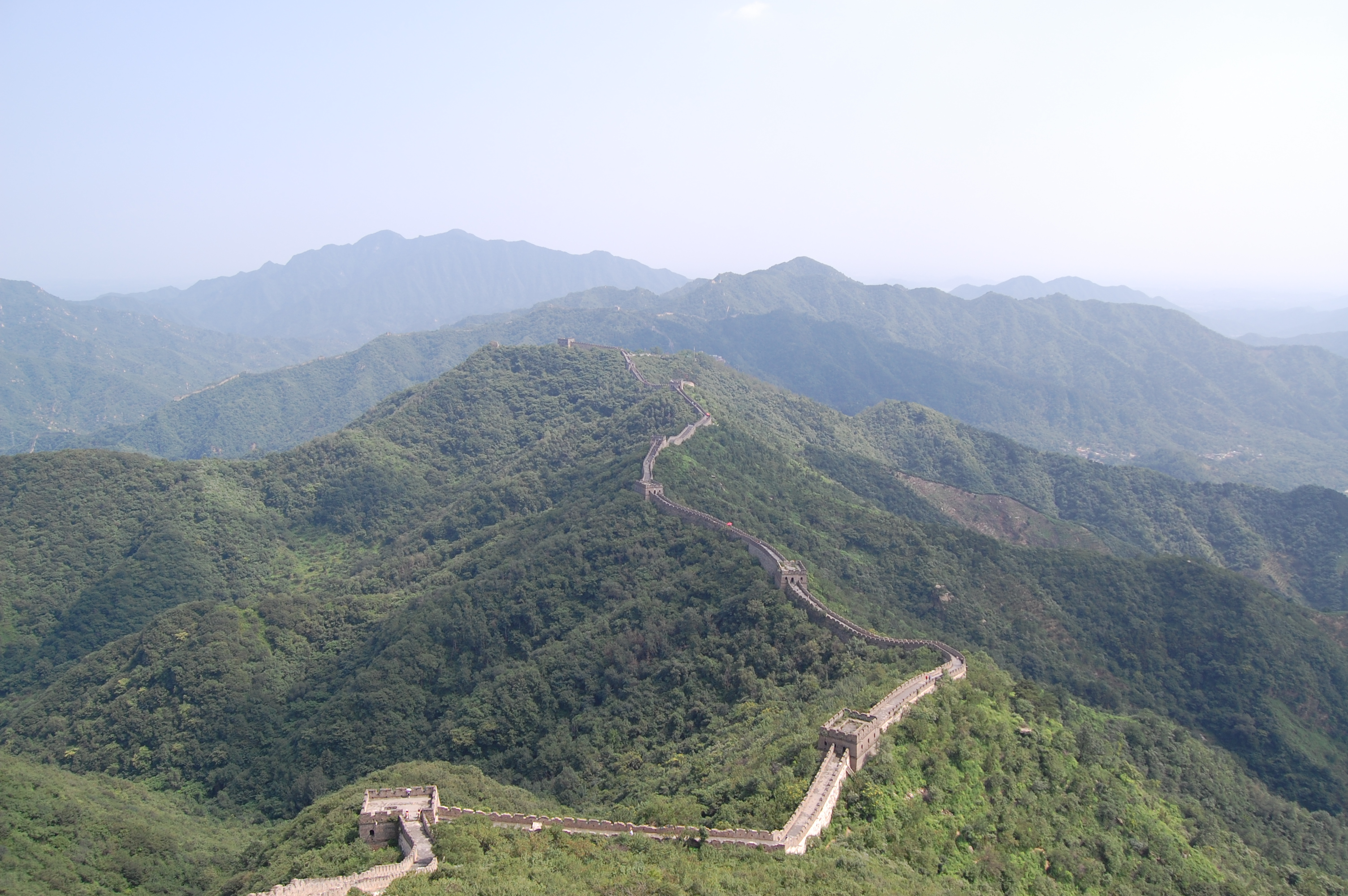
A common factoid is the incorrect claim that the Great Wall of China is visible from space with the naked eye.

A factoid was originally defined to mean a false statement presented as a fact. In colloquial speech, it is often used to mean a true but brief or trivial item of news or information (which can be less ambiguously described as a "factlet").

The term was coined in 1973 by American writer Norman Mailer to mean a piece of information that becomes accepted as a fact even though it is not actually true, or an invented fact believed to be true because it appears in print. Since the term's invention in 1973, it has become used to describe a brief or trivial item of news or information.

== Usage ==
The term was coined by American writer Norman Mailer in his 1973 biography of Marilyn Monroe. Mailer described factoids as "facts which have no existence before appearing in a magazine or newspaper", and formed the word by combining the word fact and the ending -oid to mean "similar but not the same". The Washington Times described Mailer's new word as referring to "something that looks like a fact, could be a fact, but in fact is not a fact".

Accordingly, factoids may give rise to, or arise from, common misconceptions and urban legends. Several decades after the term was coined by Mailer, it came to have several meanings, some of which are quite distinct from each other. In 1993, William Safire identified several contrasting senses of factoid:

- "factoid: accusatory: misinformation purporting to be factual; or, a phony statistic."
- "factoid: neutral: seemingly though not necessarily factual"
- "factoid: (the CNN version): a little-known bit of information; trivial but interesting data."

This new sense of a factoid as a trivial but interesting fact was popularized by the CNN Headline News TV channel, which, during the 1980s and 1990s, often included such a fact under the heading "factoid" during newscasts. BBC Radio 2 presenter Steve Wright used factoids extensively on his show.

== Versus factlet ==
As a result of confusion over the meaning of factoid, some English-language style and usage guides discourage its use. William Safire in his "On Language" column advocated the use of the word factlet instead of factoid to express a brief interesting fact as well as a "little bit of arcana" but did not explain how adopting this new term would alleviate the ongoing confusion over the existing contradictory common use meanings of factoid.

Safire suggested that factlet be used to designate a small or trivial bit of information that is nonetheless true or accurate. A report in The Guardian identified Safire as the writer who coined the term factlet, although Safire's 1993 column suggested factlet was already in use at that time. The Atlantic magazine agreed with Safire and recommended factlet to signify a "small probably unimportant but interesting fact", as factoid still connoted a spurious fact. The term factlet has been used in publications such as Mother Jones, the San Jose Mercury News, and in the Reno Gazette Journal.

== See also ==
- Chuck Norris facts
- Communal reinforcement
- Fake news
- Just-so story
- Meme
- Pseudoscience
- Talking point
- Truthiness
- Woozle effect
