= Copperton Low Line =

Electric railway in Utah, United States

Coordinates: 40.7214°N 112.1982°W

Overview
- Owner: Kennecott Copper Corporation
- Termini: Bingham Canyon Mine; Kennecott Garfield Smelter Stack

Service
- Operator(s): Kennecott Copper Corporation

The Copperton Low Line was an electric railroad in Salt Lake County, Utah. It was managed by the Kennecott Utah Copper Corporation and connected the Bingham Canyon Mine with its smelter at Garfield.

In 1948 the electric rail line replaced the Bingham and Garfield Railway (reporting mark B&G). That earlier line, opened in 1911, had been built to replace the Bingham Branch and Garfield Beach Extension of the Denver and Rio Grande Railroad, which was not providing adequate service.

The rail line has been replaced by a system of conveyors and a 17-mile-long (27 km) slurry pipeline. Current rail operations by Kennecott Utah Copper LLC only occur in the area of the smelter, on a remnant of what was a vast rail network.
