= Copperton, Utah =

- Town
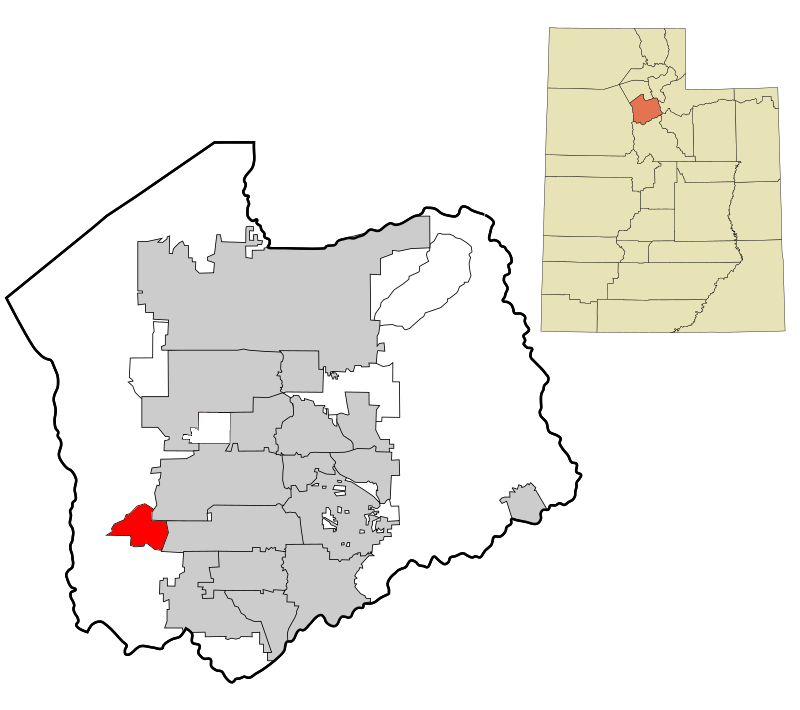
- Coordinates: 40°33′25″N 112°06′38″W
- Country: United States
- State: Utah
- County: Salt Lake
- Founded: 1926
- Incorporated as a Town: May 2024

Area
  - Total: 0.31 sq mi (0.81 km^{2})
  - Land: 0.31 sq mi (0.81 km^{2})
  - Water: 0 sq mi (0.00 km^{2})

Population (2020)
  - Total: 829
  - Density: 2,679.5/sq mi (1,034.58/km^{2})
- Time zone: Mountain (MST)
  - Summer (DST): MDT
- FIPS code: 49-15720
- GNIS feature ID: 2584760
- Website: copperton.utah.gov

Copperton is a town in Salt Lake County, Utah, United States, located at the mouth of Bingham Canyon, approximately 17 miles (27 km) southwest of Salt Lake City. Much of the town is included in the Copperton Historic District, which is listed on the National Register of Historic Places.

== History ==
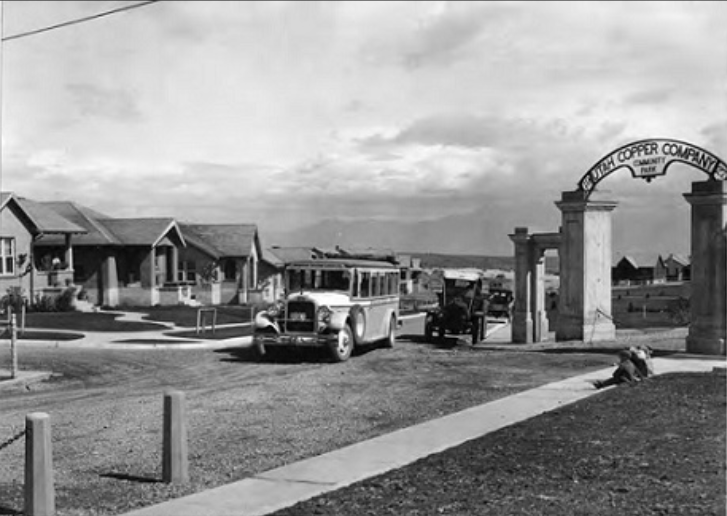
Historic image of Copperton, unknown date

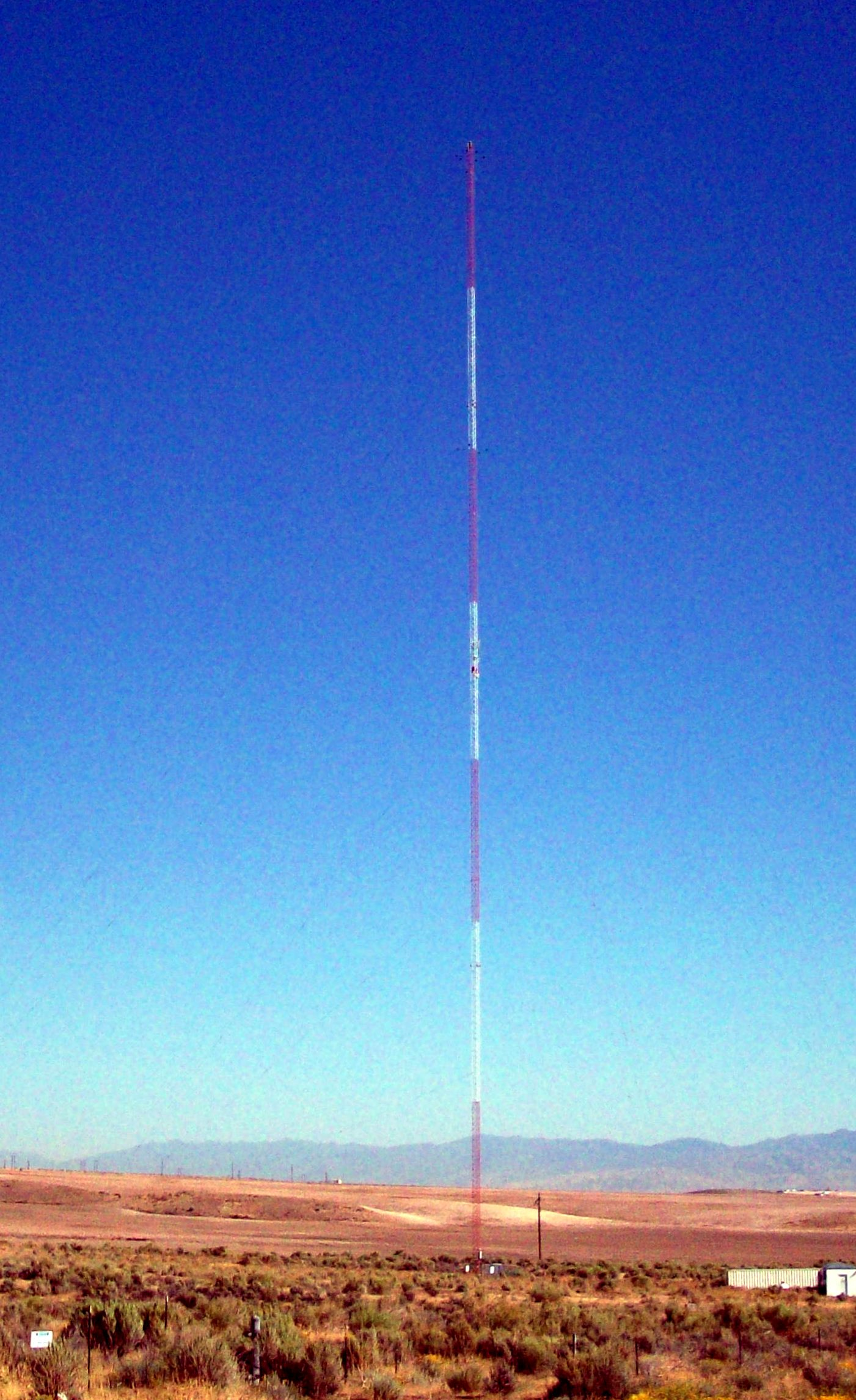
The tower for KDYL 1060 AM located near Copperton, September 2008

Copperton was established in 1926, by the Utah Copper Company as a residential area and "model city" for its employees. It emerged as a "showplace for company-subsidized family life." Housing construction ended in the 1930s, and company-furnished housing ended in 1955. After that, a private real estate developer managed the homes for employees. A rather large park was also built in the small town.

As of the 2010 Census, Copperton has a population of 826. Copperton is the only mining town remaining for the Bingham Canyon Mine after Lark was torn down in 1980. Currently, only a handful of residents work for the mine. The town's history is directly linked to the mine.

The 2017 American Community Survey reported the population at 579.

In 2015, the township's residents voted to incorporate and become a metro township.

As of May 2024, Copperton has reverted to town status.

== Climate ==
Climate is characterized by relatively high temperatures and evenly distributed precipitation throughout the year. The Köppen Climate Classification subtype for this climate is "Cfa" (Humid Subtropical Climate).

== Demographics ==
Historical population
Census	Pop.	Note	%±
2010	826		—
2020	829		0.4%
U.S. Decennial Census

== See also ==
- List of municipalities in Utah
