= Bingham Canyon Mine =

World's largest open-pit copper mine, located in Utah, US

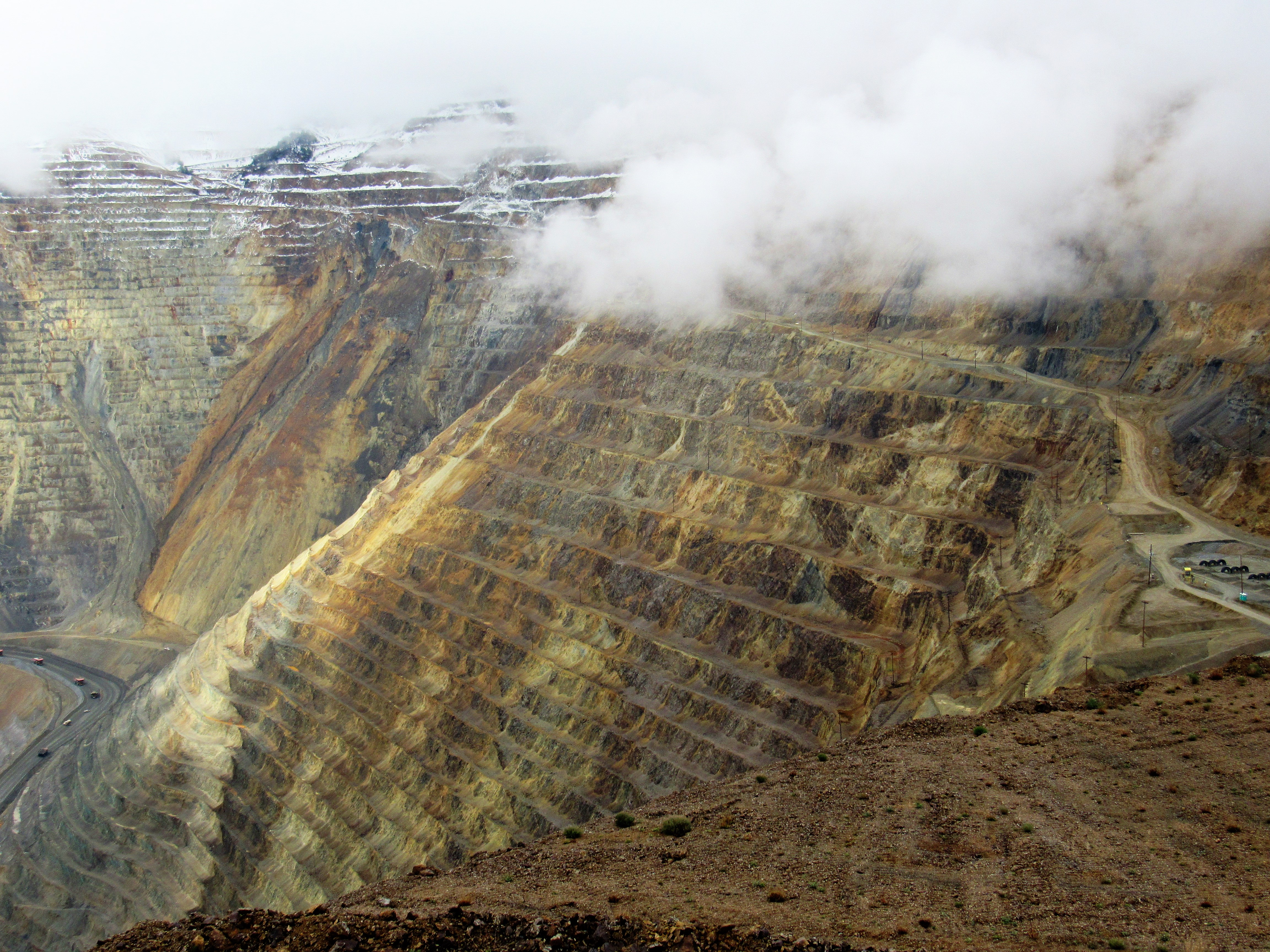
- Mine in 2003

- Location within Utah
- Location: Salt Lake County; 40°31′23″N 112°09′04″W
- Products: Copper
- Type: Open-pit
- Discovered: 1848
- Opened: 1906
- Company: Rio Tinto Group
- Bingham Canyon Open Pit Copper Mine
- U.S. National Register of Historic Places
- U.S. National Historic Landmark
- Location within Utah
- Area: 900 ha (2,200 acres)
- NRHP reference No.: 66000736

Significant dates
- Added to NRHP: November 13, 1966
- Designated NHL: November 13, 1966

The Bingham Canyon Mine, more commonly known as Kennecott Copper Mine among locals, is an open-pit mining operation extracting a large porphyry copper deposit southwest of Salt Lake City, Utah, in the Oquirrh Mountains. The mine is the largest human-made excavation, and deepest open-pit mine in the world, which is considered to have produced more copper than any other mine in history – more than 19,000,000 short tons (17,000,000 long tons; 17,000,000 t). The mine is owned by Rio Tinto Group, a British-Australian multinational corporation. The copper operations at Bingham Canyon Mine are managed through Kennecott Utah Copper Corporation which operates the mine, a concentrator plant, a smelter, and a refinery. The mine has been in production since 1906, and has resulted in the creation of a pit over 0.75 miles (1,210 m) deep, 2.5 miles (4 km) wide, and covering 1,900 acres (3.0 sq mi; 770 ha; 7.7 km^{2}). It was designated a National Historic Landmark in 1966 under the name Bingham Canyon Open Pit Copper Mine. The mine experienced a massive landslide in April 2013 and a smaller slide in September 2013.

== History ==
Minerals, in the form of copper ore, were first discovered in Bingham Canyon in 1848 by two brothers, Sanford and Thomas Bingham, sons of Erastus Bingham, Latter-Day Saint pioneers of September 1847, who grazed their cattle there. They reported their find to their leader, Brigham Young, who advised against pursuing mining operations because the survival and establishment of settlements were of paramount importance at that time. The brothers applied to that purpose as directed and did not stake a claim. In 1850, the Bingham family went to settle what is now Weber County, leaving the canyon still today known by their name.

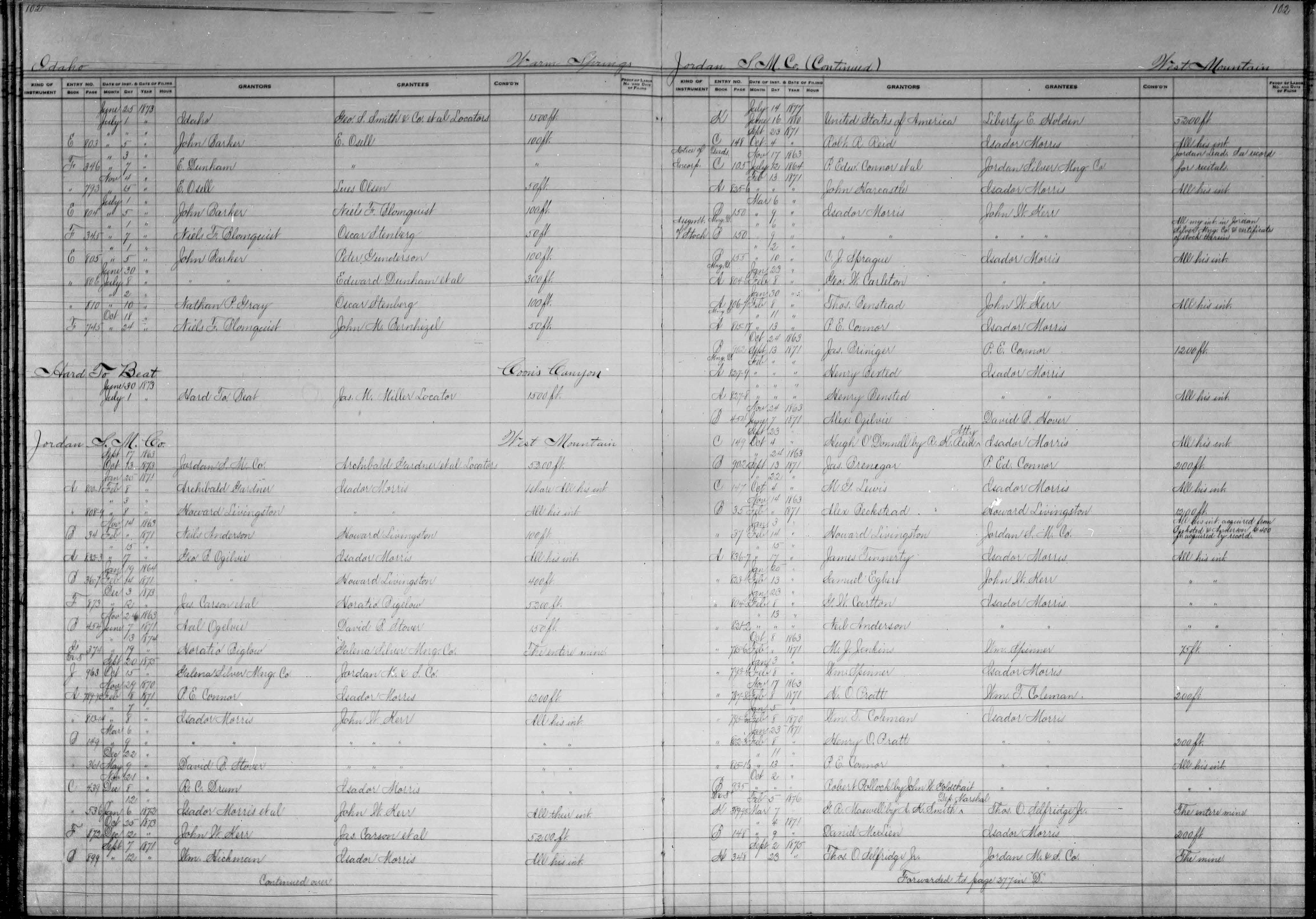
Page 102 from the Salt Lake County Recorder Mining Abstracts, Book A, showing the Jordan S.M.Co mining claim in 1863.

Bingham mine was part of the historical West Mountain Mining District. It was not until September 17, 1863, with the organization of mining districts in the state of Utah, that extraction of ore began, and the potential of the canyon's mineral resources began to be widely recognized. The first claim located was "Jordan S.M.Co" (Silver Mining Company) on September 17, 1863, the day the district was organized. Soon followed were other mining claims, including Galina and Independence in 1864, and Buckeye and Spanish in 1865. George B. Ogilvie and 23 others located the West Jordan claim in 1870. At first, mining was confined to placer gold, lead-silver, and copper-gold. Porphyry copper required processing and a railroad, which reached the canyon in 1873.

Enos Andrew Wall started working claims in 1887. His extensive tunnels and test pits, on his 200-acre (81 ha), indicated ore containing 2% copper.

The canyon's 19th Century mines were relatively small, and it wasn't until the end of the century that very large-scale exploitation of the canyon's ore bodies began to develop with open-pit mining. In 1896, Samuel Newhouse and Thomas Weir acquired the Highland Boy Mine, which was rich in copper, silver, and gold. Together they formed the Utah Consolidated Gold Mines, Ltd. with English investors. They then formed the Boston Consolidated Gold and Copper Co., Ltd., for the development of low-grade copper ore adjacent to the Utah Copper Company site.

Another significant development took place in 1903, when Daniel C. Jackling and Enos A. Wall organized the Utah Copper Company. Utah Copper immediately began construction of a pilot mill at Copperton, just beyond the mouth of the canyon, and the company actually started mining in 1906.

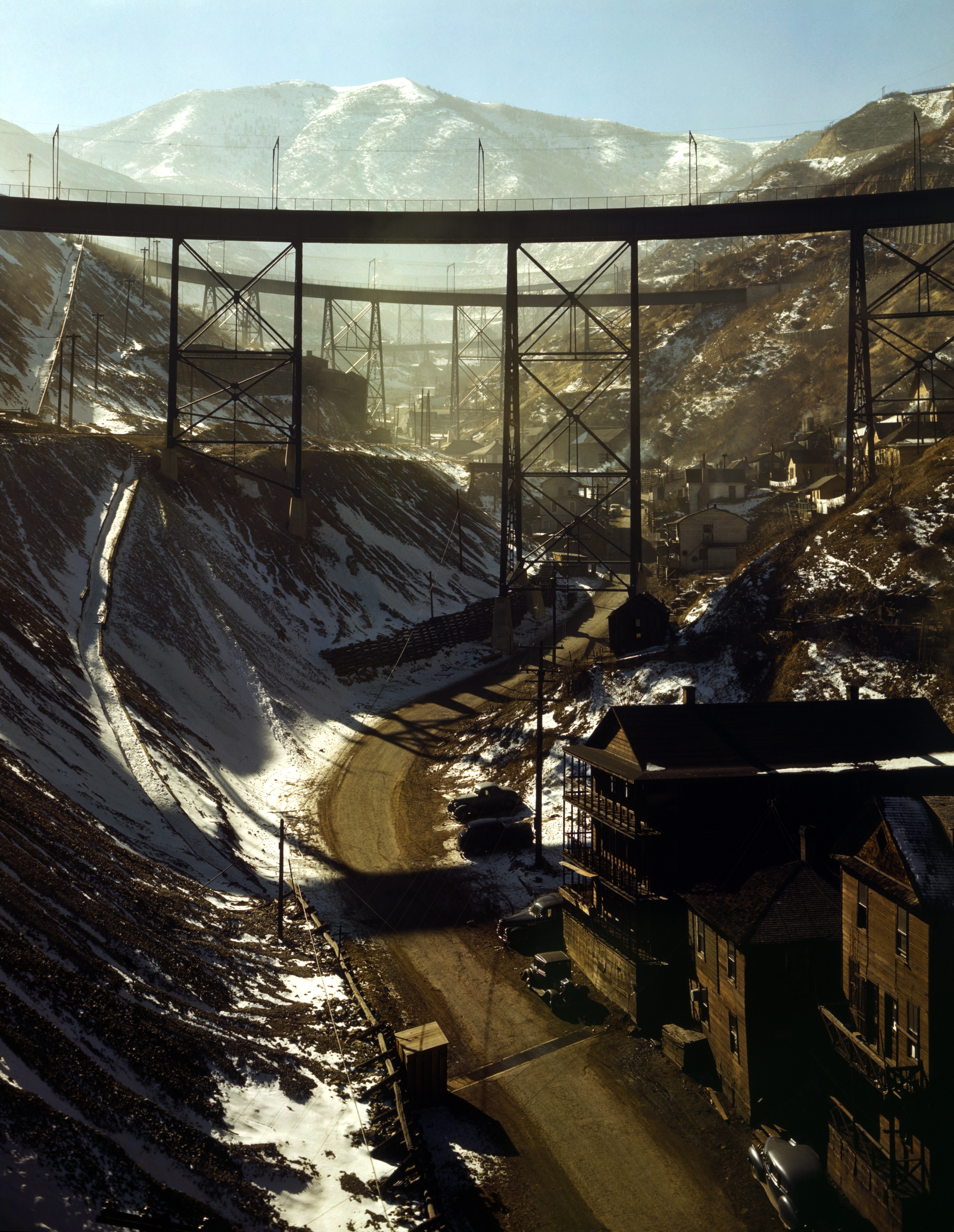
Bingham Canyon Mine, November 1942. Carr Fork Canyon as seen from "G" bridge.

The success of Utah Copper in mining the huge but low-grade porphyry copper type ore body at Bingham Canyon was based on Jacklin's 1904 decision to use open-pit mining, steam shovels, and the railroad. The mine became a showplace for "railroad-pit operations," and the industrial complex defined by the mine and the ASARCO smelting operation made it the "largest industrial mining complex in the world" by 1912.

Utah Copper and Boston Consolidated merged after their separate surface operations approached each other in 1906. The Kennecott Copper Corporation, established to operate mines in Kennecott, Alaska, purchased a 25 percent financial interest in Utah Copper in 1915, which increased to 75 percent in 1923.

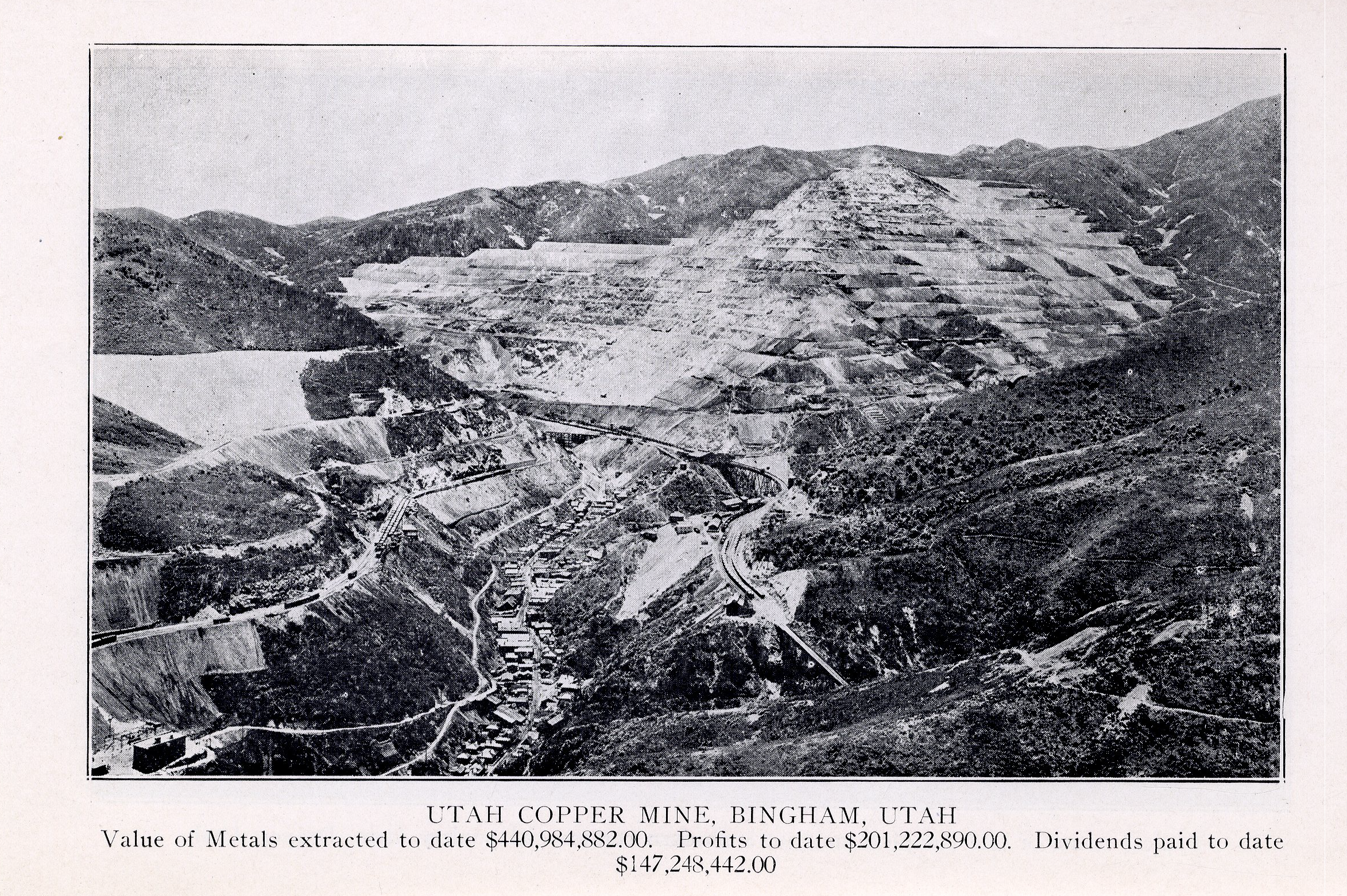
Utah Copper Mine, c. 1925, with a view of Main St. in Bingham Canyon. The Auditor lists the total earnings for the mine. Image from the Salt Lake County Auditor Annual Report, 1928.

Bingham's Canyon mine expanded rapidly, and by the 1920s, the region was a beehive of activity. Some 15,000 people of widely varying ethnicity lived in the canyon in large residential communities constructed on the steep canyon walls. The population declined rapidly as mining techniques improved, and several of the mining camps were swallowed up by the ever-expanding mine. By 1980, when Lark was dismantled, only Copperton, at the mouth of Bingham Canyon and with a population of 800, remained.

The 21 separate mining operations in existence by 1911 were consolidated into two in 1970: Kennecott and The Anaconda Minerals Company. In 1985 open-pit mining operations were halted by Kennecott's Utah Copper. In 1986, Kennecott discovered gold in nearby Barney's Canyon.

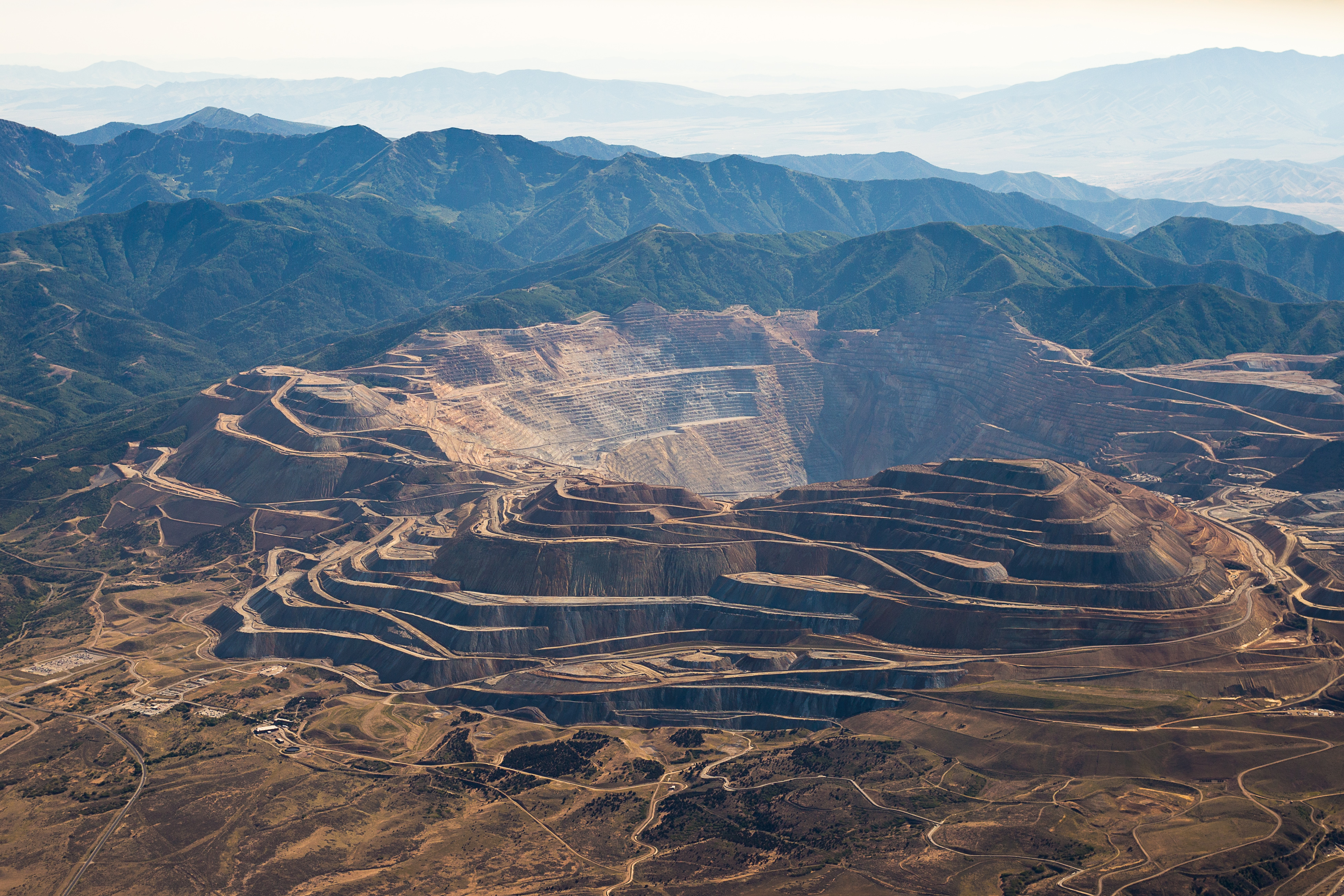
The Bingham Canyon Mine, an aerial photograph taken June 2018

KCC was purchased by Sohio in 1981, and the mine reopened in 1987 after BP Minerals purchased the assets. In 1989 the Rio Tinto Group acquired the asset, which modernized the mine, mill, and smelter.

The open-pit owners replaced an antiquated 1000-car railroad with conveyor belts and pipelines for transporting the ore and waste, which reduced costs by nearly 30% and returned the operation to profitability.

=== Landslides ===
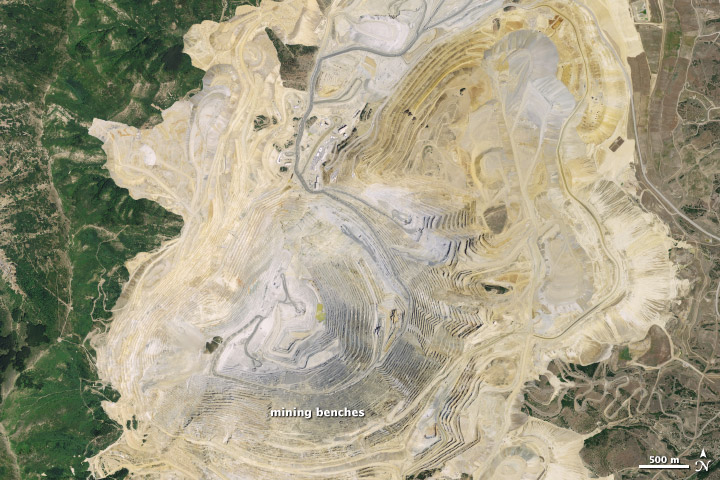
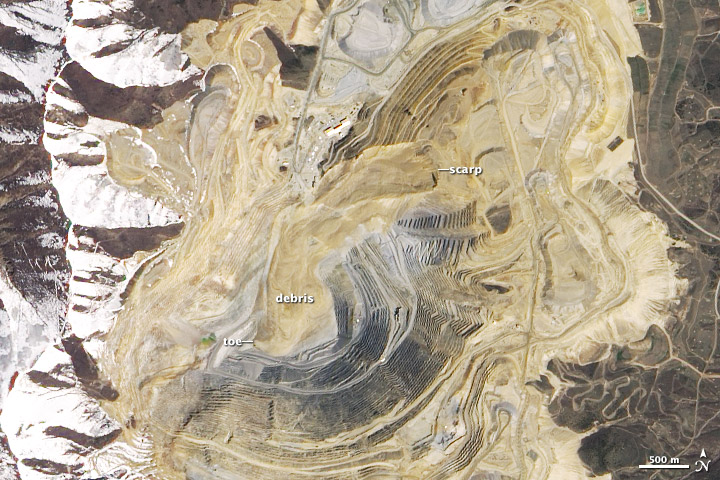
Bingham Canyon Mine satellite images before (left, July 20, 2011) and after (right, May 2, 2013) a landslide on April 20, 2013

At 9:30 pm on April 10, 2013, a landslide occurred at the mine. Around 2.3–2.5 billion cubic feet (65×10^{6}–70×10^{6} m^{3}) of dirt and rock thundered down the side of the pit. It is possibly the largest historic non-volcanic landslide in North America. On the basis that the mine's steep walls made it a high risk for landslides, an interferometric radar system had been previously installed to monitor the ground's stability. As a result of warnings produced by this system, mining operations had been shut down the previous day in anticipation of the slide and there were no injuries. The massive slide was expected to cut production of mined copper by 100,000 tonnes (98,000 long tons; 110,000 short tons). A second slide caused an evacuation of 100 workers on September 11, 2013. Another, less severe slide occurred on May 31, 2021.

=== Environmental history ===
Similar to other industrial age mining operations, the mine historically had adverse environmental effects on the habitats of fish and wild animals as well as air and water pollution, creating health hazards to the surrounding public. Different federal agencies concerned with environmental conservation have used strict legal rules to pressure the subsidiary of Kennecott copper mine to comply with environmental regulations. Since the early 1990s, Kennecott has spent more than $400 million on clean-up efforts on the affected areas to avoid regulatory laws that would have placed them on the Superfund National Priorities List (NPL).

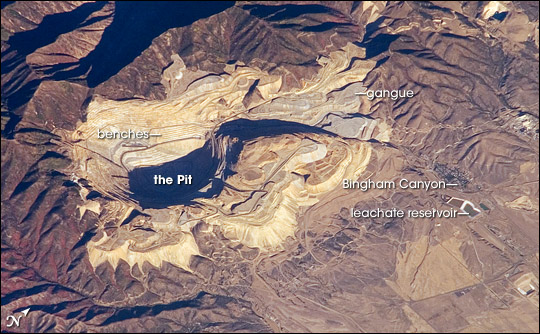
Annotated aerial photo

The figure above shows a comparison of two satellite images used to identify the changes in the Bingham Canyon Mine between 1985 and 2016 JuxtaposeJS Embed

== Geology ==
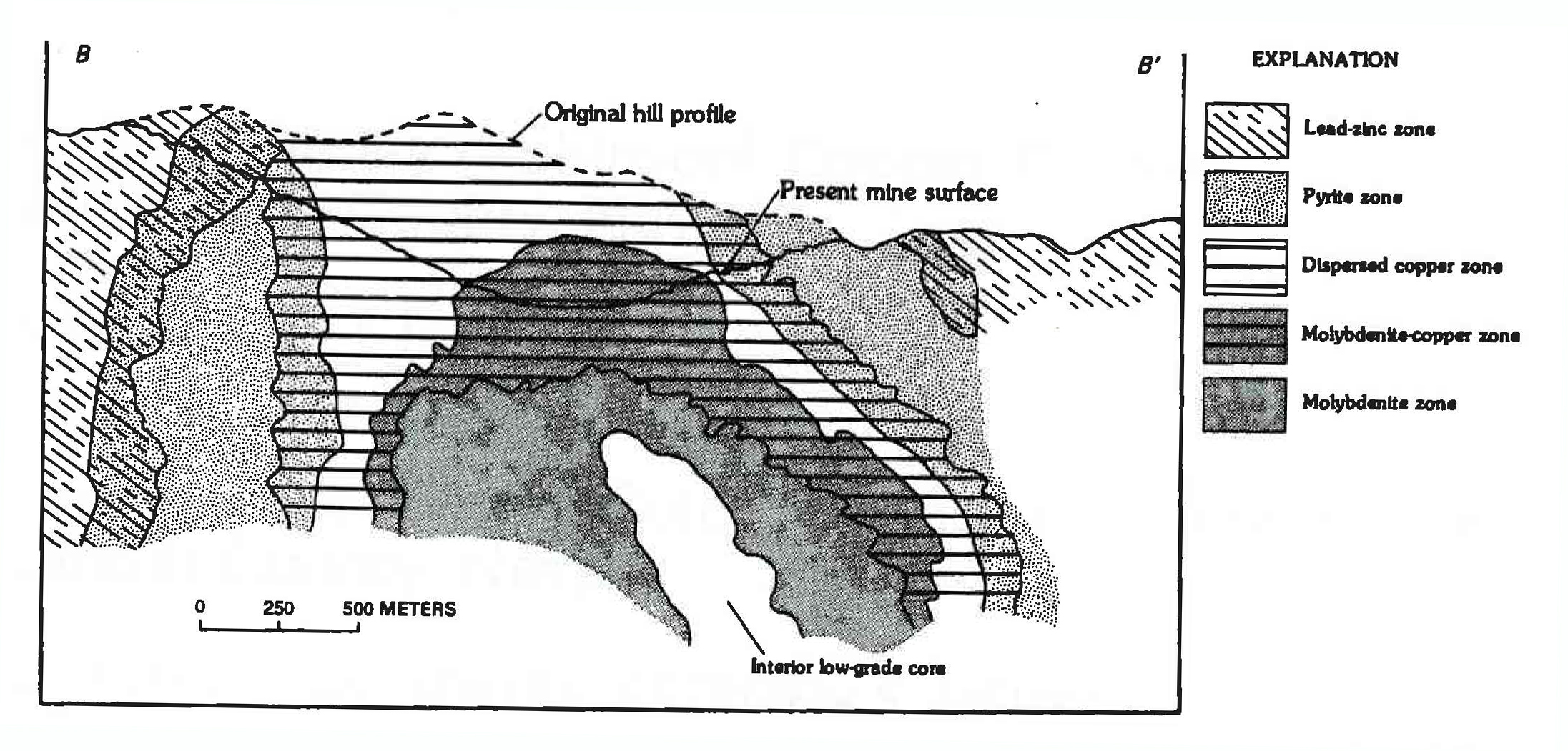
Cross-section through open pit, showing ore zonation

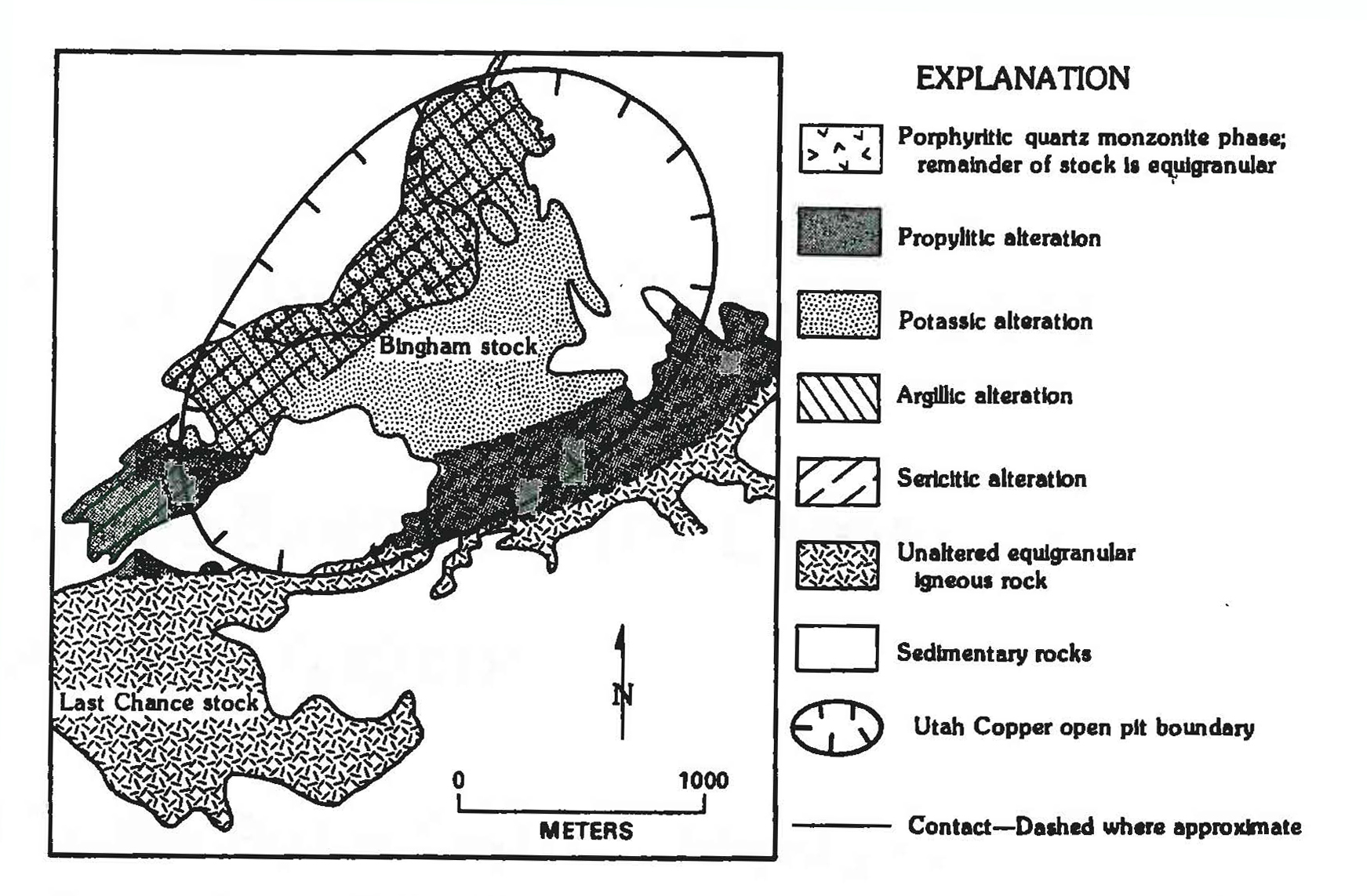
Geologic map showing bedrock geology and alteration zones, USGS.

The Bingham Canyon ore deposits occur in the Bingham nappe. They are a porphyry copper deposit, formed by a quartz monzonite porphyry intruded into sedimentary rocks. They exhibit a concentric alteration pattern and mineralogic zonation around the Bingham stock. These zones include a central core containing magnetite, followed by "a molybdenite zone low in copper, a bornite-chalcopyrite-gold higher grade copper zone, a pyrite-chalcopyrite zone, a pyrite zone, and an outermost lead-zinc zone."

Structurally, Late Paleozoic rocks were thrust faulted over the Precambrian craton during the Cretaceous Sevier orogeny. These rocks were later intruded and altered in the Tertiary by granitoid rocks. This igneous event was the source of deposition of gold, silver and other base metals.

Copper and molybdenum sulfide minerals are dispersed in the intruded stock and in the adjoining carbonate sedimentary skarns. The main stratigraphic rocks in Bingham Canyon are Upper Pennsylvanian sandstones, quartzites, and limestones known as the Bingham Mine Formation in the Oquirrh Group. The central porphyry ores formed from mantle hydrothermal circulation while the outer vein and deposits in the sedimentary rocks formed at lower temperature when magmatic and meteoric waters mixed.

== Recovery process ==
The extracted ore is treated at the Kennecott smelter at nearby Magna, Utah. The ore is run through a concentrator, where grinding mills reduce it to the consistency of face powder. Flotation then separates the gangue from the metalliferous particles, which float off as a 28-percent concentrate of copper along with lesser amounts of silver, gold, lead, molybdenum, platinum and palladium. A selective flotation step separates the molybdenite (molybdenum disulfide) from the chalcopyrite.

The filtered concentrate slurry is piped 17 miles (27 km) to the smelter, where it is dried, and then injected along with oxygen into a flash smelting furnace to oxidize the iron and sulfur. The oxidized iron is skimmed off, while the sulfur dioxide gas is captured and sent to an on-site acid plant for conversion to valuable sulfuric acid – a million tons of it each year.

Left behind is a molten copper sulfide called matte. The 70-percent-copper matte is water-quenched to form a sand-like solid, then injected, with oxygen, into a flash-converting furnace that produces molten, 98.6-percent-pure copper. This copper is then cast into 700-pound (320 kg) anode plates and shipped by rail to the refinery.

At the refinery, the anode plates are pressed flat and interleaved with stainless steel cathode blanks. Automated robotic vehicles place the prepared anodes in cells containing an acidic electrolyte. When the cells are electrified, the anodes slowly dissolve, freeing copper ions that are deposited on the cathode as 99.99-percent-pure copper.

Impurities and precious metals settle to the bottom of the electrolytic cells as anode slimes. A chlorination leaching process recovers the gold and silver, which is melted in induction furnaces.

== Operations ==
Utah Copper Co. Mill, Bingham Canyon, c. 1910

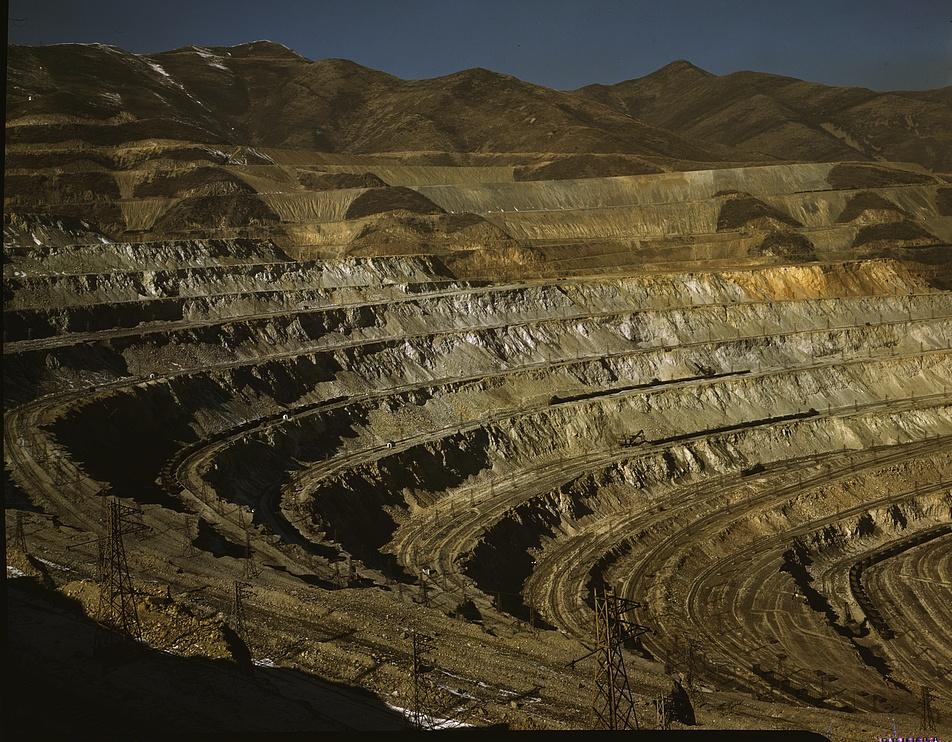
Utah Copper Company open-pit mine workings at Carr Fork, 1942. Photo by Andreas Feininger.

Kennecott's Bingham Canyon Mine is the largest artificially made excavation in the world, and is visible to the naked eye from an orbiting space shuttle. Employing some 2,000 workers, 450,000 short tons (400,000 long tons; 410,000 t) of material are removed from the mine daily. Electric shovels can carry up to 56 cubic yards (43 m^{3}) or 98 short tons (88 long tons; 89 t) of ore in a single scoop. Ore is loaded into a fleet of 64 large dump trucks which each carry 255 short tons (228 long tons; 231 t) of ore at a time; the trucks themselves cost about $3 million each. There is a five-mile (8 km) series of conveyors that take ore to the Copperton concentrator and flotation plant. The longest conveyor is 3 miles (4.8 km) long.

As of 2010, Kennecott Utah Copper was the second largest copper producer in the US, and provided about 13-18% percent of the U.S.'s copper needs. It is one of the top producing copper mines in the world, with production at more than 18.7 million short tons (16.7 million long tons; 17.0 Mt). Every year, Kennecott produces approximately 300 thousand short tons (272 kt or 268 thousand long tons) of copper, along with 400 thousand troy ounces (13.7 short tons 12.4 tonnes, or 12.2 long tons) of gold, 4 million troy ounces (124 tonnes, 137 short tons or 122 long tons) of silver, about 10 thousand short tons (9,100 tonnes or 8,900 long tons) of molybdenum, and about a million short tons (910 kt or 890 thousand long tons) of sulfuric acid, a by-product of the smelting process. Rio Tinto purchased Kennecott Utah Copper in 1989 and has invested about $2 billion in the modernization of KUC's operations.

=== Production ===
Bingham Canyon has proven to be one of the world's most productive mines. As of 2004, its ore had yielded more than 17 million tons of copper, 715 tons of gold, 5,900 tons of silver, and 425,000 tons of molybdenum. The value of the resources extracted from the Bingham Canyon Mine is greater than the Comstock Lode, Klondike, and California gold rush mining regions combined. Mines in Chile, Indonesia, Arizona, Peru, Democratic Republic of the Congo, and Zambia exceeded Bingham Canyon's annual production rate in 2023. High molybdenum prices in 2005 made the molybdenum produced at Bingham Canyon in that year worth more than the copper. The value of metals produced in 2006 at Bingham Canyon was US $1.8 billion. As of 2023, this location produced approximately 150,000 short tons (140,000 t) of copper ore per year.

== Environmental impact ==
In 1990, homes that had been built on former flood plains were discovered to be contaminated with high levels of lead and arsenic. Activities to clean up 100 years of accumulated impacts began in the 1990s, under Utah Department of Environmental Quality and federal oversight, and are ongoing.

The EPA lists "Kennecott South Zone/Bingham" on its superfund webpage, after it was proposed to be listed as a superfund site in 1994. The South Zone includes the Bingham Mining District in the Oquirrh Mountains, about 25 mi (40 km) southwest of Salt Lake City, the open pit, waste rock dumps, Copperton Mill, and other historic sites. The company avoided regulatory issues of being on the NPL by voluntarily cleaning up the contaminated lands, the Superfund Alternative Approach. The listing proposal was withdrawn in 2008.

=== 1900–1909 ===
By 1904, there were three large copper smelters and one lead smelter in the Salt Lake valley. The sulfur dioxide gas emissions from the smokestacks caused significant crop damage to neighboring crops. During the 1904–1905 winter, the farmers gathered together and decided to file suit against the smelters in the United States District Court of Utah. In 1906, Federal Court Judge Marshall ruled that the smelters could not smelt ores containing more than 10% sulfur, effectively closing all of the aforementioned smelters.

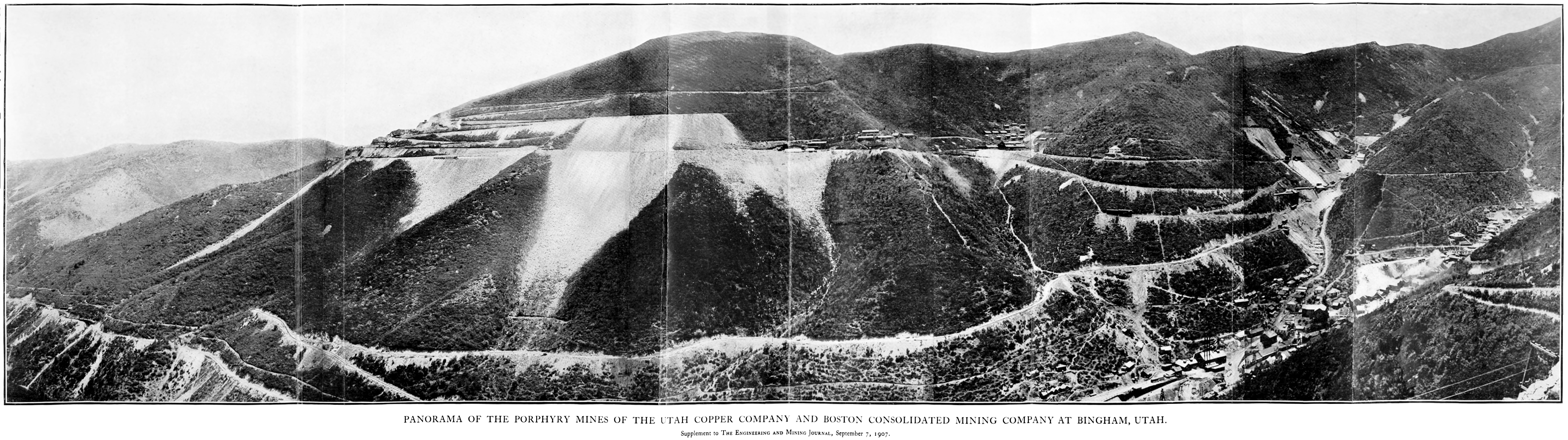
Panorama of the mines of the Utah Copper Company and the Boston Consolidated Mining Company in 1907.

=== 1910–1979 ===
Kennecott Copper Mines was formed in 1910 after a merger of Utah Copper and Kennecott copper mining companies. By 1912, environmental protection organizations were complaining about high levels of asbestos being used in the organization. Kennecott Corporation was using asbestos for preventing fires since copper processing requires very high temperatures. Copper has a very high boiling point of 4,644 °F (2,562 °C) and also requires use of other chemicals to separate it from other metals and impurities present in the ore. Asbestos has microscopic particles that dispersed into the atmosphere and contributed to illnesses among workers and individuals living near the mines. Asbestos is responsible for illnesses such as pleural fibrosis, skin warts and lung cancer.

Kennecott Corporation was also cited as contributing to emissions of heavy metals such as arsenic and mercury. By 1940, arsenic and mercury were also some of the concerns that were raised by environmental protection agencies against Kennecott Corporation. Both mercury and arsenic are dangerous to health in even small quantities.

=== 1980–1989 ===
Chemical spills, 1980-1989
Year	Amount	Substance Released	Cause
1989	100,000,000 US gallons (380,000,000 L) (est)	Process water containing arsenic	Unknown

Investigations in the 1980s revealed contamination of groundwater caused by the release of hazardous materials from mining operations. The State of Utah proceeded with legal action against Kennecott and filed a damage claim against the mine in October 1986, for the loss and destruction of the natural resources, specifically the groundwater.

There was also a threat due to the tailings dam. An engineering report in March 1988, gave information that the tailings dam overshadowing the town of Magna had threat of collapse due to an earthquake and that the billion-ton tailings pond would bury the homes nearby if the tailing pond's embankment failed. The mine responded by proposing various potential strategies including buying up entire subdivisions near the tailings pond, calculating the company's liability if the embankment failed, investing $500 million (or $1.4 billion today) to reinforce the embankment, and colluding with state regulators to keep the engineering report out of the public eye.

=== 1990–1999 ===
Chemical spills, 1990-1999
Year	Amount	Substance Released	Cause
1999	100,000,000 US gallons (380,000,000 L) (est)	Process water containing arsenic	Unknown
1998	unknown	Acid rock drainage	Clogged pipe
1997	unknown	Copper sulphate	Clogged outlet valve
1997	unknown	Process water with pH 2.5-4.0	Ruptured pipeline
1993	45,000 US gallons (170,000 L)	Wastewater	Transfer line rupture
1991	30,000 US gallons (110,000 L)	Industrial wastewater	Line break

Starting in the beginning of 1990s, dust emissions from mining began polluting surrounding areas, caused by an area near the mine where PM10 levels (particulate matter 10 μm or smaller) began to rise from 28μg/ m^{3} to 50 μg/m^{3}, posing severe health concerns for residents. The first report of PM10 rising was proposed by Schwartz and Dockery in 1992. Then, in 1997, Carter (a professor at Brigham Young University) put forward that the mine discharge of PM10 has caused lung damage to neighboring residents.

In 1995, due to scientific research showing that mining had caused the pollution of groundwater, Utah passed laws to make Kennecott companies pay $37 million (or $78 million today) to control water pollution.

As a result of mine discharge sewage containing large amounts of arsenic and selenium – selenium being particularly toxic to birds, fish and amphibians – about 30% of the fish population were killed in the early 1990s. In 1995 Kennecott, the EPA, and the State of Utah signed an agreement saying that Kennecott will continue to clean up the discharge sewage.

=== 2000–2014 ===
From 2000 through 2011 the Bingham Canyon copper mine has had numerous chemical spills.

Chemical spills, 2000-2014
Year	Amount	Substance Released	Cause
2011	145,424 US gallons (550,490 L)	Copper tailings	Equipment malfunction
2011	100,000–290,000 US gallons (380,000–1,100,000 L)	Copper tailings	Unknown
2011	160,000 US gallons (610,000 L)	Tailings	Unknown
2010	4,000–5,000 US gallons (15,000–19,000 L)	Sulfuric acid	Unknown
2007	1,240,000 US gallons (4,700,000 L)	Process water containing arsenic	Cold temperatures
2006	270,000 US gallons (1,000,000 L)	Process water	Pump failure
2006	660,000 US gallons (2,500,000 L)	Process water containing arsenic	Cracked pipe
2006	1,000,000 US gallons (3,800,000 L)	Process water	Failed indicator
2004	4,000,000 US gallons (15,000,000 L)	Process water containing arsenic	Cracked pipe
2004	2,000,000 US gallons (7,600,000 L)	Process water containing arsenic	Ruptured process water line
2004	202,000 US gallons (760,000 L)	Process water	Pipeline failure
2003	70 short tons (64 t)	Copper concentrate	Unknown
2003	10.27 short tons (9.32 t)	Copper concentrate containing arsenic, copper, and lead	Pipeline rupture
2003	240,681 short tons (218,342 t)	Copper, arsenic, and lead	Copper concentrate pipeline rupture
2002	5,800 US gallons (22,000 L)	Process water from slag pot	Plugged drain line
2001	19 pounds (8.6 kg)	Arsenic, chromium, and lead	Tailings pipeline failure
2000	110 short tons (100 t)	Ore slurry	Leak in ore line
2000	18,000 short tons (16,000 t)	Sulfuric acid	Flange failure

The EPA has estimated a 72-square-mile (190 km^{2}) plume of contaminated groundwater has been created over the course of the mine due to multiple spills and runoff. Long-term effects of the underground water supply contamination may include an increased demand for surface water solutions as the population of the Salt Lake valley grows since the county will not be able to tap into the groundwater supply.

In 2007, Kennecott Utah Copper LLC was considering expanding its land holdings to Rose Canyon Ranch in the southern Oquirrh mountains and Yellow Fork Canyon land in Salt Lake County. Kennecott claims rights to file a mining claim in accordance with the Stock-Raising Homestead Act of 1916.

In 2008, the United States Department of Interior Fish and Wildlife Service sued Kennecott after the release of hazardous substances including selenium, copper, arsenic, zinc, lead, and cadmium. A federal biologist claimed that these chemicals have caused great damage to the ecosystems and resources that support the migrant bird populations, as well as other fish and wildlife habitats.

In the northern zone near Magna, Utah, the extensive southern tailings pond has been collecting the tailings since the mine first started mining production. Kennecott Utah Copper LLC has requested permission for a Tailings Expansion Project (TEP) to expand the tailings pond impoundment in Magna, which is already at 1.8-billion-short-ton (1.6-billion-tonne) capacity, and to expand on 721 acres (1.1 sq mi; 2.9 km^{2}) of wetlands south of the Great Salt Lake. The company has come under scrutiny for the instability of the structure. The Salt Lake Tribune published a report in 2007 revealing that the company failed to disclose information on possible damages that could occur if the tailings pond collapsed in the event of a major earthquake. From 2001 through 2009 there have been six earthquakes ranging from 2.3 to 3.4 in magnitude with an average epicenter only three miles (4.8 km) away from Magna.

== In popular culture ==
Bingham Canyon Mine was featured in the 1973 made-for-TV movie Birds of Prey, with protagonist helicopter pilot Harry Walker (played by David Janssen) piloting his Hughes 500 into the open pit to track down three bank robbers and their hostage in an Aérospatiale SA 315B Lama, which was hidden behind heavy mining machinery. It was also featured prominently in The Fundamentals of Caring. In the PC video game American Truck Simulator, players can simulate hauling cargo at the mine.

== See also ==
- Bingham Canyon Reclamation Project
- Chuquicamata, a similarly sized copper mine in Chile.
