= Historic Union Pacific Rail Trail State Park =

Recreational trail in Summit County, Utah

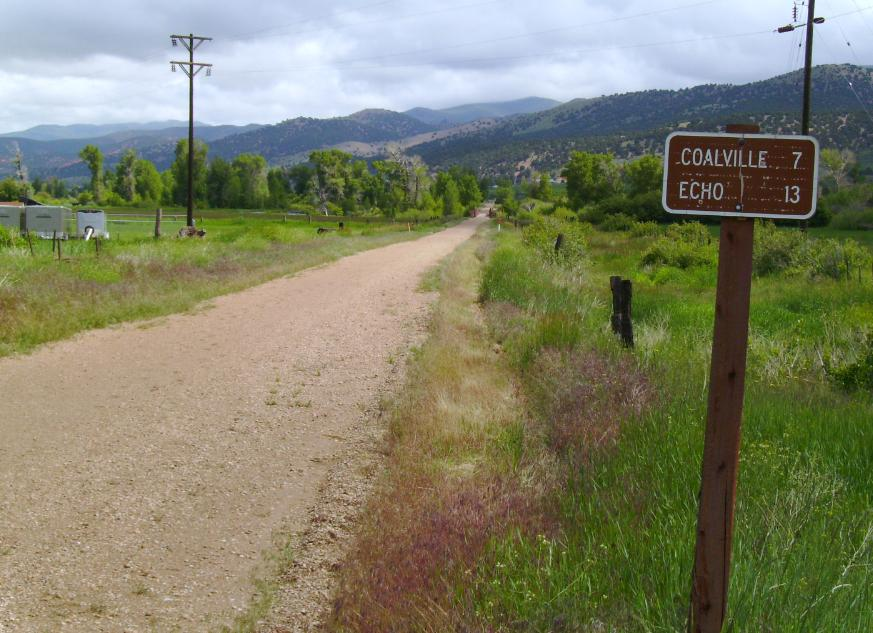
- Trail just north of Wanship

- Location within Utah Location within the United States
- Interactive map of Historic Union Pacific Rail Trail; State Park
- Location: Summit County, Utah, United States
- Coordinates: 40°39′36″N 111°30′05″W
- Area: 450 acres (180 ha)
- Elevation: 6,900–5,280 ft (2,100–1,610 m)
- Opened: 1992
- Operator: Utah State Parks
- Website: Official website
- Utah State Parks

The Historic Union Pacific Rail Trail State Park is a recreational trail that follows abandoned railroad lines in Summit County, Utah, United States.

The Historic Union Pacific Rail Trail is 28 miles (45 km) long, and averages 125 feet (38 m) wide. The trail stretches between Park City (beginning at 40.66°N/111.5013889°W) and Echo Reservoir (ending at 40.972041°N/111.437895°W), following Interstate 80 across Silver Creek Canyon, then going along the Weber River through the towns of Wanship and Coalville. Elevation along the trail varies from 5,280 feet (1,610 m) to 6,900 feet (2,100 m), and total acreage is 450 acres (1.8 km^{2}). The trail is designated to be used for only non-motorized activities, including biking, hiking, horseback riding, jogging, and Nordic skiing. The trail is managed by the Mountain Trails Foundation.

== History ==
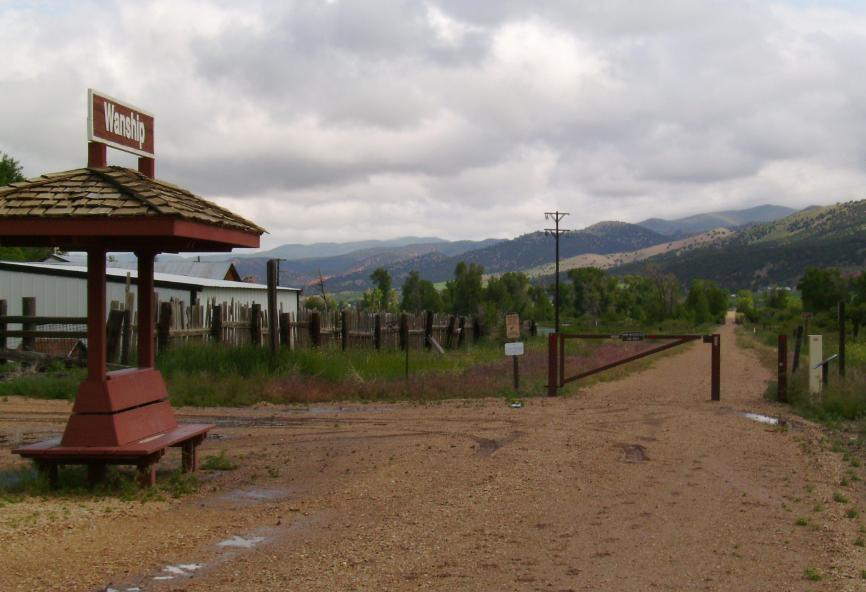
The Wanship stop

In 1871 the Summit County Railroad Company was organized. It constructed a five-mile (8 km) narrow gauge railway to transport coal from mines in Coalville to the Union Pacific line in Echo. In 1880, the Utah Eastern Railroad built a narrow-gauge line between Coalville and Park City to transport coal to fuel the pumps that removed underground water from Park City’s silver mines. At the same time, the Union Pacific Railroad constructed the Echo-Park City Railway, a broad-gauge spur line, alongside it.

The narrow-gauge lines were eventually abandoned, and in 1989, Union Pacific abandoned its line. Union Pacific, along with the Division of Parks and Recreation, and A&K Railroad Materials, turned the property into the first non-motorized recreational trail in Utah. The state park opened to the public in 1992.
