= Kennecott Utah Copper =

Major copper mining and refining company

Coordinates: 40°32′50″N 112°00′13″W

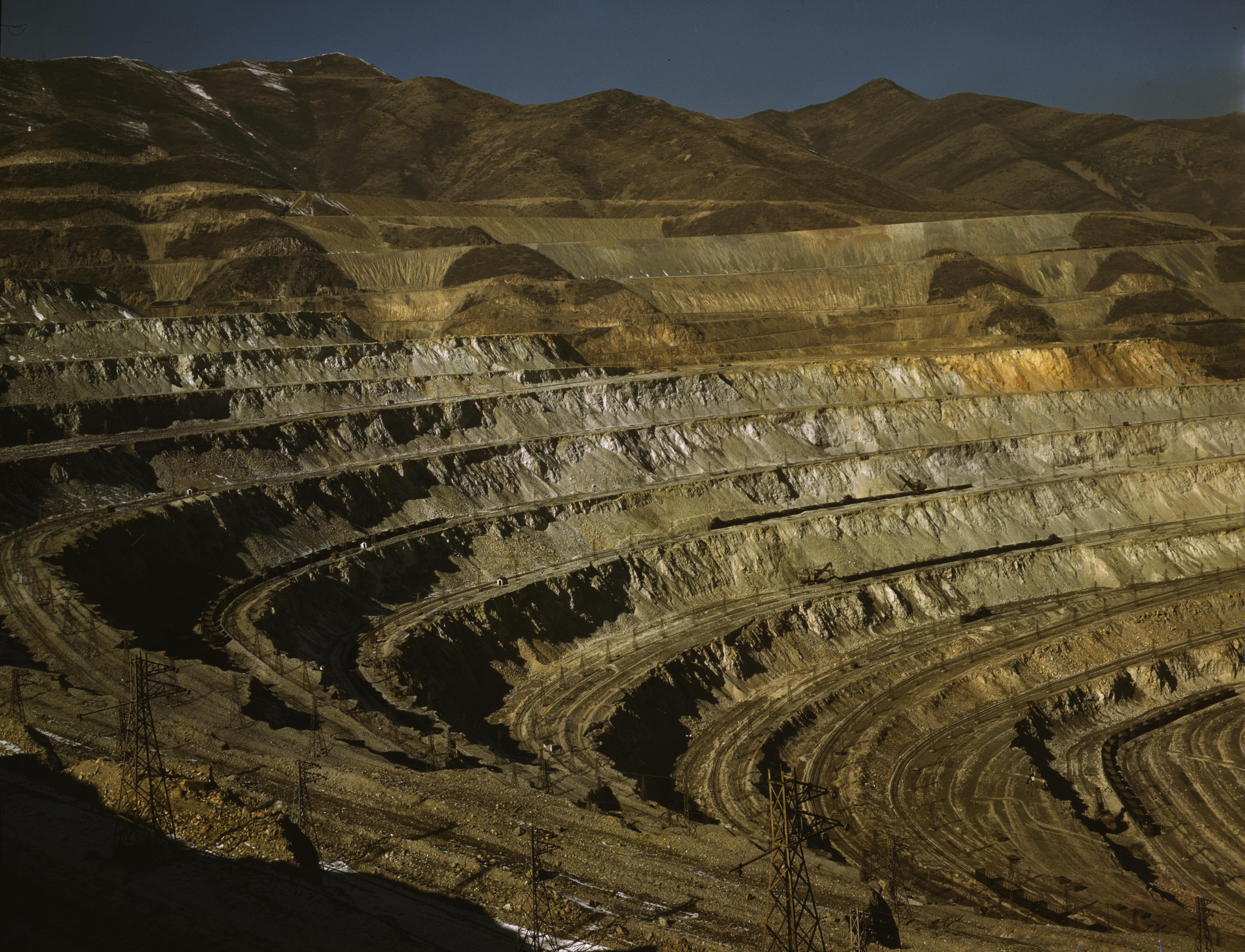
Bingham Canyon in 1942

Kennecott Utah Copper LLC (KUC), a division of Rio Tinto Group, is a mining, smelting, and refining company. Its corporate headquarters are located in South Jordan, Utah. Kennecott operates the Bingham Canyon Mine, one of the largest open-pit copper mines in the world in Bingham Canyon, Salt Lake County, Utah. The company was first formed in 1898 as the Boston Consolidated Mining Company. The modern corporation was formed in 1989. The mine and associated smelter produce 1% of the world's copper.

== History ==
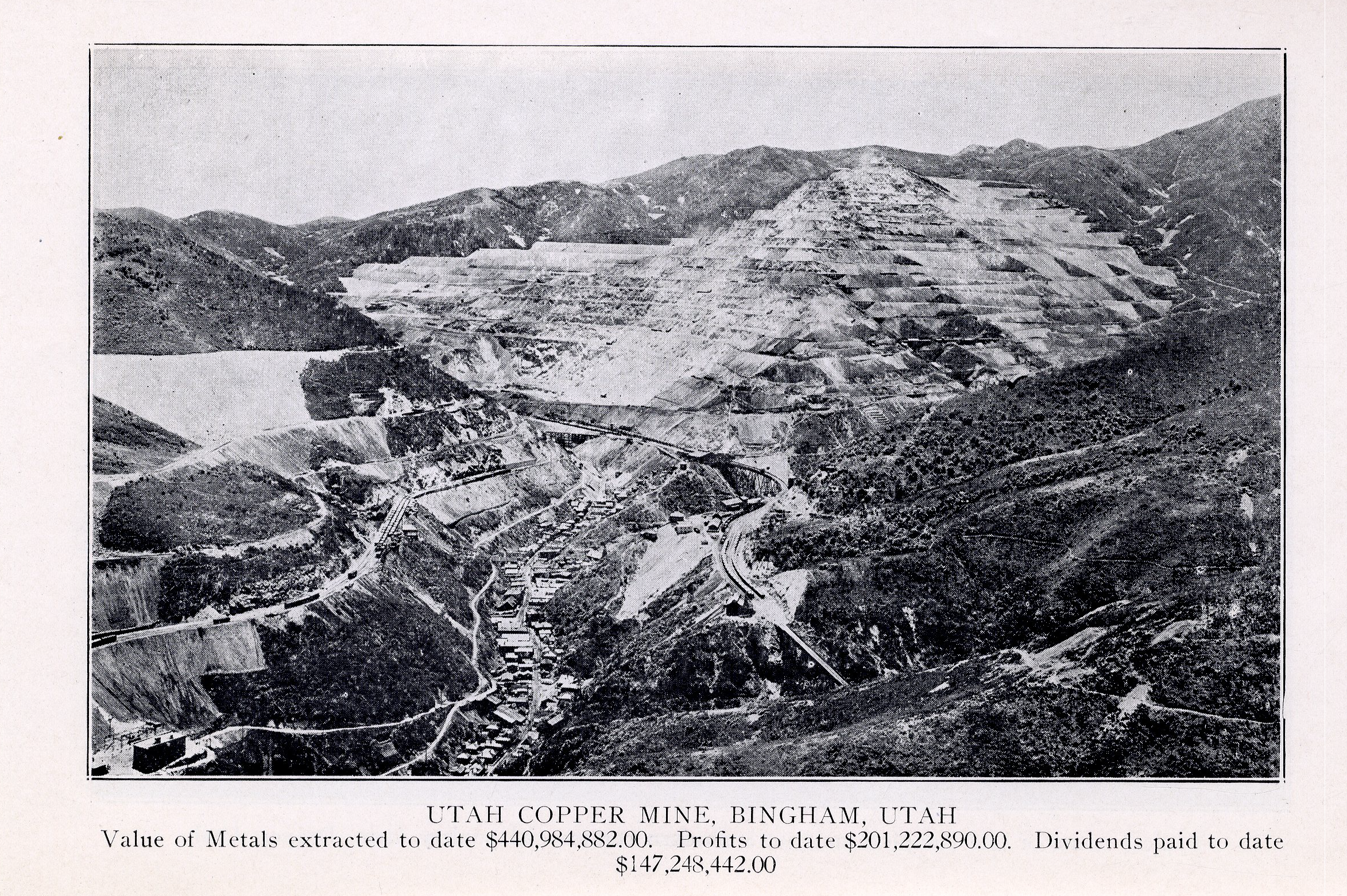
Utah Copper Mine, circa 1925, with a view of Main St. in Bingham Canyon. The Auditor lists the total earnings for the mine. Image from the Salt Lake County Auditor Annual Report, 1928.

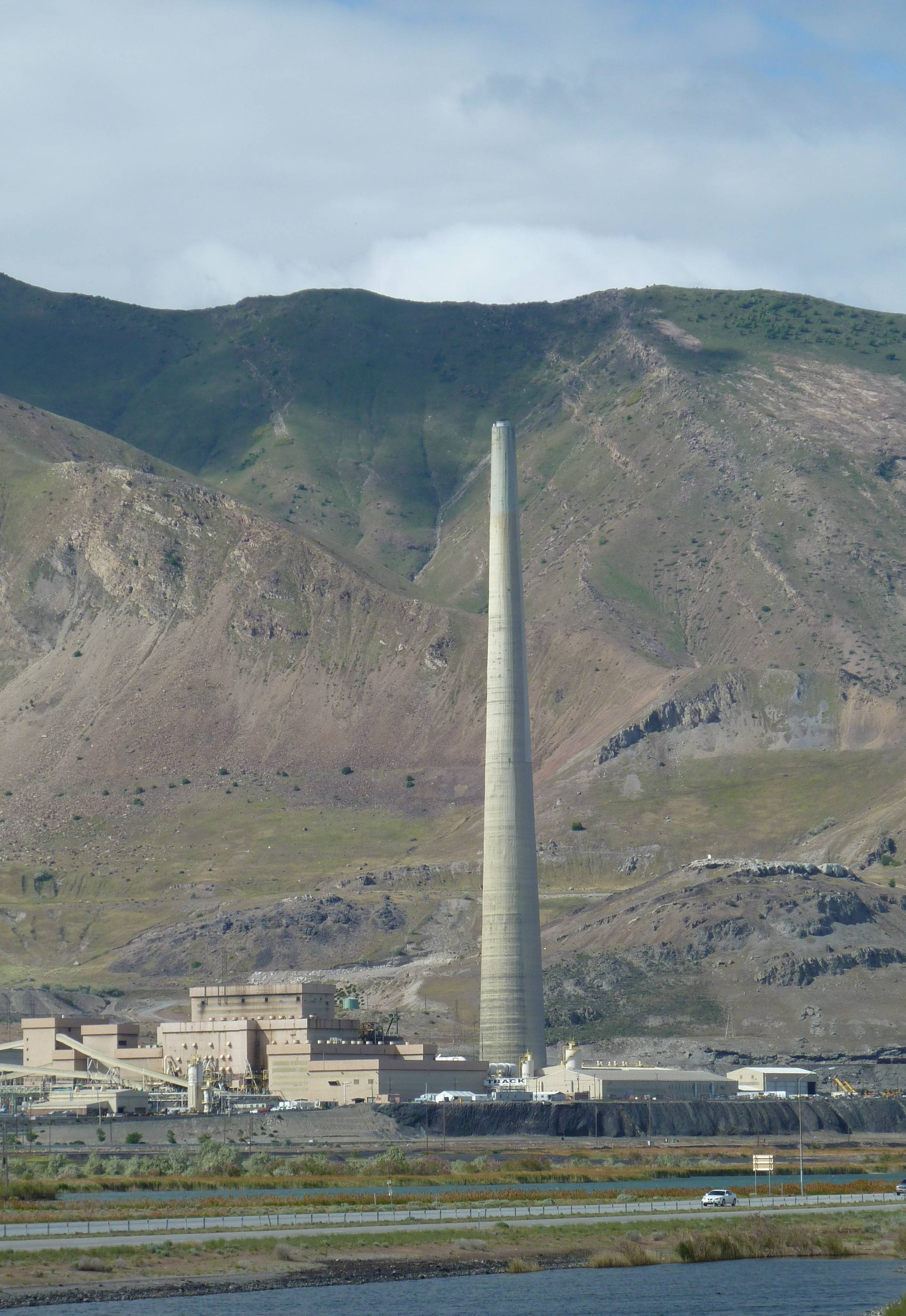
Kennecott Utah Copper's Garfield Smelter, with Interstate 80 in the foreground

Utah Copper Company had its start when Enos Andrew Wall realized the potential of copper deposits in Bingham Canyon, 15 miles (24 km) southwest of Salt Lake City, Utah in 1887. He acquired claims to the land and started underground mining. In the mid-1890s, metallurgist Daniel C. Jackling and mining engineer Robert C. Gemmell inspected the property and liked the prospects. Both men examined Wall's properties and recommended open-pit mining. In 1898, Samuel Newhouse and Thomas Weir formed the Boston Consolidated Mining Company.

Jackling and Wall formed the Utah Copper Company on 4 June 1903, with Charles L. Tutt Sr., Charles MacNeill, Spencer Penrose, Boies Penrose, Tal Penrose, and Dr. R.A.F. Penrose as investors. MacNeill was named president, Spencer "Speck" Penrose was named secretary-treasurer, and Jackling was named general manager. The company immediately started a pilot mill at Copperton.

With financing from Guggenheim Exploration, the first digging began in 1906. The same year, the Kennecott Mines Company was formed in Alaska, named after explorer and naturalist Robert Kennicott. A smelter was also started at Garfield, Utah by the American Smelting and Refining Company (ASARCO) to refine the Bingham Canyon ore.

In 1907, the Utah Copper mill in Magna started operation. Utah Copper and Boston Consolidated merged in 1910. Five years later, in 1915, Kennecott acquired a 25% interest in the company. In 1915, to dilute the cost of railroad construction to support the mines, and to find new ventures for the capital produced by the Alaskan mine, Kennecott Copper Corporation was incorporated from the various financial interests involved. By this time, the Guggenheim Exploration was already actively working copper mines in Chile and Utah. Upon Kennecott's creation, they merged their Braden Copper Company property in Chile, as well as 25 percent of the Utah Copper Company, into Kennecott.

These actions resulted in Kennecott taking possession of Braden's El Teniente, the world's largest underground copper mine, located in the Chilean Andes. Founded by William Braden and E.W. Nash of New York City, the Braden Copper Company had started mining there in 1906.

In Utah, the Bingham and Garfield Railway opened in 1911 to transport local ore, replacing the Denver and Rio Grande Railroad's line. In 1936, Kennecott acquired all the assets of the Utah Copper Company.

During World War II, Bingham set new world records for copper mining and produced about 30% of the copper used by the Allies. During the war, many women worked for the first time in the mines, mills, and smelters, replacing the men who had gone to war.

On September 9, 1949 three Kennecott company officers were killed in an airplane bombing in Quebec. They were the retiring president E.T. Stannard; his designated successor, Arthur D. Storke; and R.J. Parker, a vice-president. They were incidental to what became known as the Albert Guay Affair, innocent bystanders killed in a private revenge. Guay had shipped a timed-explosive device in the luggage of his wife on this flight. When it exploded, she and all the other passengers and crew on the plane were killed. Charles Cox, formerly head of Carnegie-Illinois Steel, was hired shortly after to fill the executive vacuum at Kennecott. Guay and his two accomplices, Marguerite Pitre and Généreux Ruest, were all convicted of murder and executed for the bombing.

By 1961, Kennecott's copper mines in the United States included four large open pits in Arizona, New Mexico, and Nevada. As the mine in Utah expanded, it subsumed the land on which the City of Bingham Canyon was built, and the city was disincorporated in 1971.

In 1981, after a worldwide fall in copper prices, Standard Oil of Ohio (SOHIO) acquired Kennecott. Production was interrupted from 1985 to 1987. In 1986, Asarco purchased the Ray mine in Arizona from Kennecott. In 1987, British Petroleum acquired SOHIO, and Kennecott became part of BP Minerals America.

In 1989, Rio Tinto Zinc (RTZ) purchased mining assets from BP. Kennecott Utah Copper Corporation was formed by Rio Tinto in 1989 as a new mining company under the laws of the State of Utah.

== Operations ==
Today, the second-largest copper producer in the US, Kennecott Utah Copper provides about 8% of the US annual copper consumption of 1,700,000 tonnes. Kennecott’s Bingham Canyon Mine is the largest man-made excavation in the world. It is one of the top producing copper mines in the world with cumulative production over 17,000,000 tonnes (19,000,000 short tons) of copper. In 2020, Bingham Canyon produced 140,000 tonnes (310,000,000 lb) of copper, along with 171,200 troy ounces (5,320 kg) of gold, 2,205,000 troy ounces (68,600 kg) of silver, and 20,400 tonnes (45,000,000 lb) of molybdenum. Since Rio Tinto purchased Kennecott Utah Copper in 1989, it has invested about $2 billion in the modernization of KUC’s operations. In 2020, Kennecott Utah Copper directly employed 2,171 people and contributed to more than 14,000 indirect Utah jobs.

Rio Tinto Group, one of the world's largest mining operations, comprises dual-listed companies Rio Tinto Limited (based in Melbourne) and Rio Tinto PLC (based in London). Although each company trades separately, the two Rio Tintos operate as one business.

== Sustainability ==
KUC is considering alternatives that will keep the Bingham Canyon Mine open for additional decades. A massive rock slide at the mine in 2014 did not stop Rio’s plans to extend the mine’s life by another decade to 2029. The company says there’s still as much ore in the ground as miners have taken out of Bingham Canyon since it began production in 1906. The company proposes to expand the mine and reach an additional 700 million tons of ore resource by pushing back the south wall of the Bingham Canyon Mine 1,000 feet and deepening it 300 feet.

== Environmental impact ==
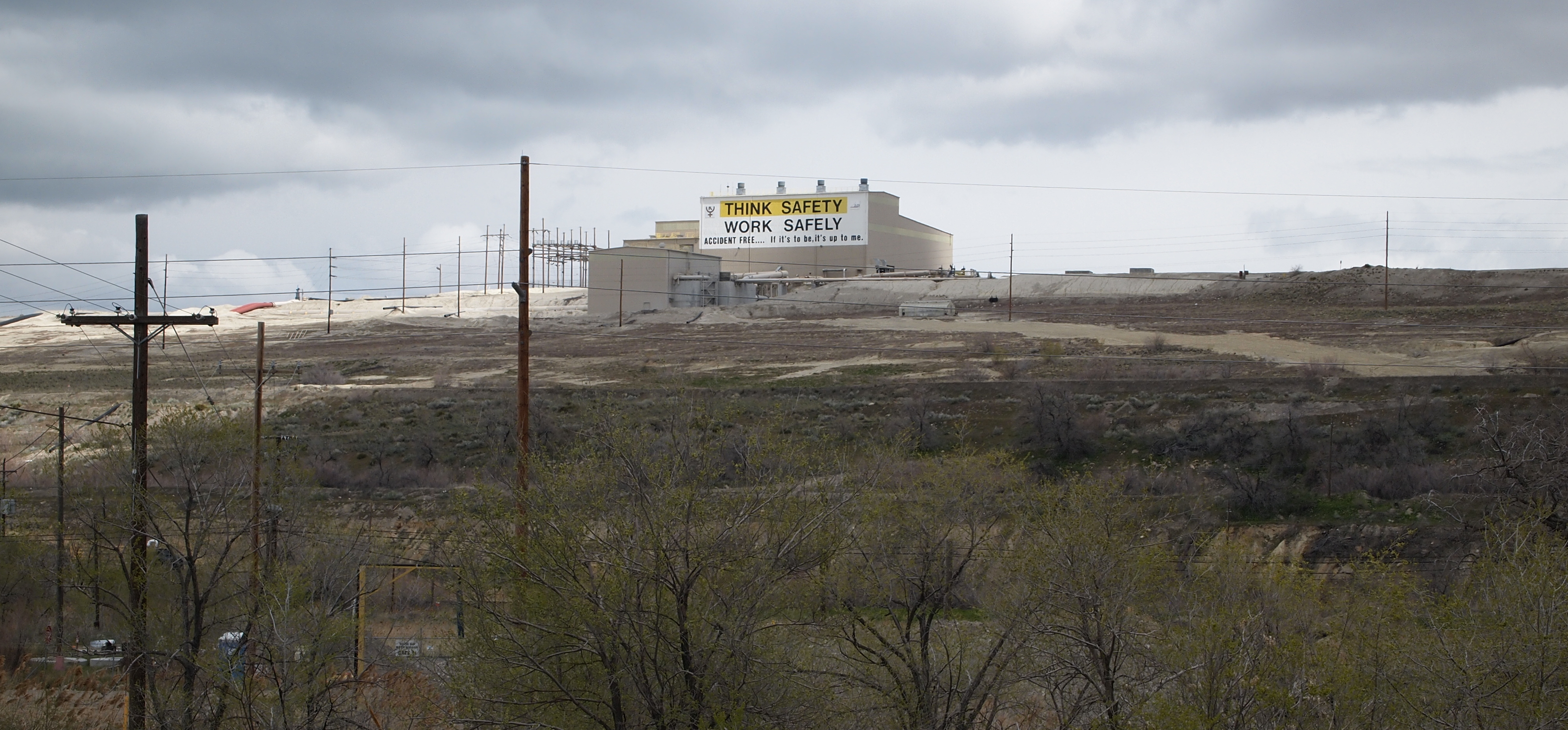
Kennecott tailings dam near the Great Salt Lake

Significant groundwater contamination exists in the aquifer downgradient of the Bingham Canyon mining operations. Starting in the late 1980s, the State of Utah Natural Resource Damage Trustee has overseen the investigation of mining-influenced groundwater and the implementation of cleanup actions performed by Kennecott and the Jordan Valley Water Conservancy District to address two groundwater plumes located in southwest Salt Lake County. The plumes were caused by historical mining practices in the Kennecott South Zone. Approximately 80 square miles (210 km^{2}) are impacted in the southwest portion of Salt Lake County. Because of the remediation efforts, which include more than a $100 million investment in a reverse osmosis facility, Kennecott's South End, (location of the contaminated aquifer) was removed from the United States Environmental Protection Agency (EPA) National Priorities List (NPL). This investment represents one of many remediation projects along the Oquirrh Mountains to clean up historic mining sites. To date, Kennecott Utah Copper has remediated more than 10,000 acres (4,000 ha; 40 km^{2}) of the total 40,000 acres (16,000 ha; 160 km^{2}) impacted by mining at a cost of more than $450 million. KUC has spent more than $350 million on the cleanup of historic mining waste and $100 million on groundwater cleanup.

Kennecott's copper mine concentrators, power plant and smelter is the leading facility for toxic releases in the state of Utah, according to a 2017 report by the US Environmental Protection Agency. The company's combined operations are believed to account for 3.5 percent of Salt Lake Valley's air pollution, according to Utah Department of Air Quality statistics. Editorialists continue to criticize Kennecott for the amount of lead the smelter puts into the air each year: 6,250 pounds (2,830 kg).

Environmental groups have lauded Rio Tinto’s decision to drop its requested permit for a new rock crushing plant at the copper mine. Kennecott originally wanted the crusher to shore up a mine-waste pond. Kennecott now says it can keep mining without expanding its tailings impoundment.

In January 2012, the Utah Department of Health's Environmental Epidemiology Program (EEP) received a report from a concerned citizen stating that berm dust from the mine's tailing evaporation ponds was blowing onto Interstate 80, causing them malaise and sore throat each time they drove through it. The EEP recommended further studies to identify and quantify the levels of materials blown from the tailings ponds.

== Land development ==
Another Rio Tinto-owned company manages the non-mining land and water assets previously owned by KUC, Kennecott Land Company. Kennecott Land was established by Rio Tinto in April 2001 to develop surplus mining land. Daybreak Community, the first part of the process, is situated on 4,126 acres (1,670 ha; 16.70 km^{2}) in the city of South Jordan where 20,000 homes and up to 14,000,000 square feet (1,300,000 m^{2}) of commercial space are planned. Opened in 2009, Daybreak's first commercial center, SoDa Row, contains a boutique, restaurants, hair salon and more.

== Labor relations ==
During the copper strike of 1912, Utah Copper Company brought many Mexican and Mexican American strikebreakers to the Bingham mine. Most of them did not remain after the settlement of the strike. Company records reveal that, by 1918-19, large numbers of Spanish-surnamed individuals began to be employed at the mine, and additional Latinos were recruited during the labor shortages of WWII. For many of these men, it marked the beginning of long careers as copper workers. Issues of the company magazine 'Kennescope' in the 1950s emphasized the diversity of the work force. In 1953, there were 20 ethnic backgrounds, from Native American to Japanese.

Kennecott laid off 200 workers in March 2016 due to a fall in global commodity prices.

== See also ==
- Bingham Canyon Mine
- Harkers Canyon
