= Feather River Route =

Railway section in Northern California, Nevada and Utah

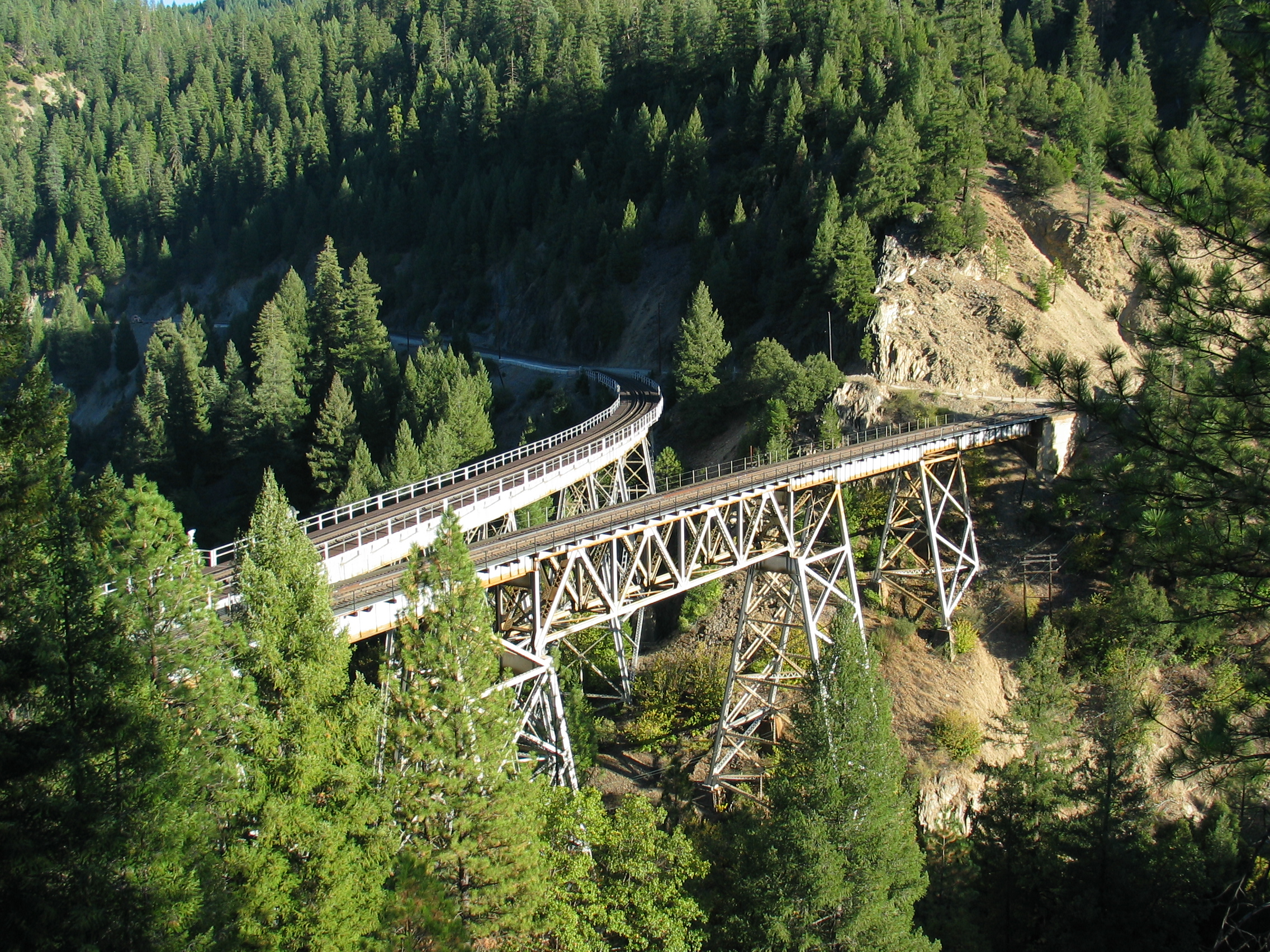
- Keddie Wye, 2013

Overview
- Owner: Union Pacific Railroad
- Locale: California; Nevada; Utah
- Termini: Salt Lake City; Oakland
- Connecting lines: Oakland Subdivision; Sacramento Subdivision; Winnemucca Subdivision; Elko Subdivision; Shafter Subdivision; Lynndyl Subdivision

Service
- Type: Freight rail; Commuter rail
- Operator(s): Union Pacific Railroad; Altamont Corridor Express

History
- Commenced: 1906; 120 years ago
- Completed: 1909; 117 years ago

Technical
- Line length: 927 mi (1,492 km)
- Number of tracks: 1
- Track gauge: 1,435 mm (4 ft 8 1/2 in) standard gauge
- Old gauge: 1,000 mm (3 ft 3 3/8 in) metre gauge
- Train protection system: PTC

The Feather River Route is a rail line that was built and operated by the Western Pacific Railroad. It was constructed between 1906 and 1909, and connects the cities of Oakland, California, and Salt Lake City, Utah. The line was built to compete with the Southern Pacific Railroad, which at the time held a nearly complete monopoly on Northern California rail service. The route derives its name from its crossing of the Sierra Nevada, where it follows both the North and Middle Forks of the Feather River. The route is famous for its impressive engineering qualities and its considerable scenic value. All of the route is now owned and operated by the Union Pacific Railroad; however, the Union Pacific has transferred significant portions of the route to other lines. The portion still called the Feather River Route by the Union Pacific runs from the California Central Valley to Winnemucca, Nevada and has been divided into three subdivisions named the Sacramento, Canyon and Winnemucca subdivisions.

== History ==
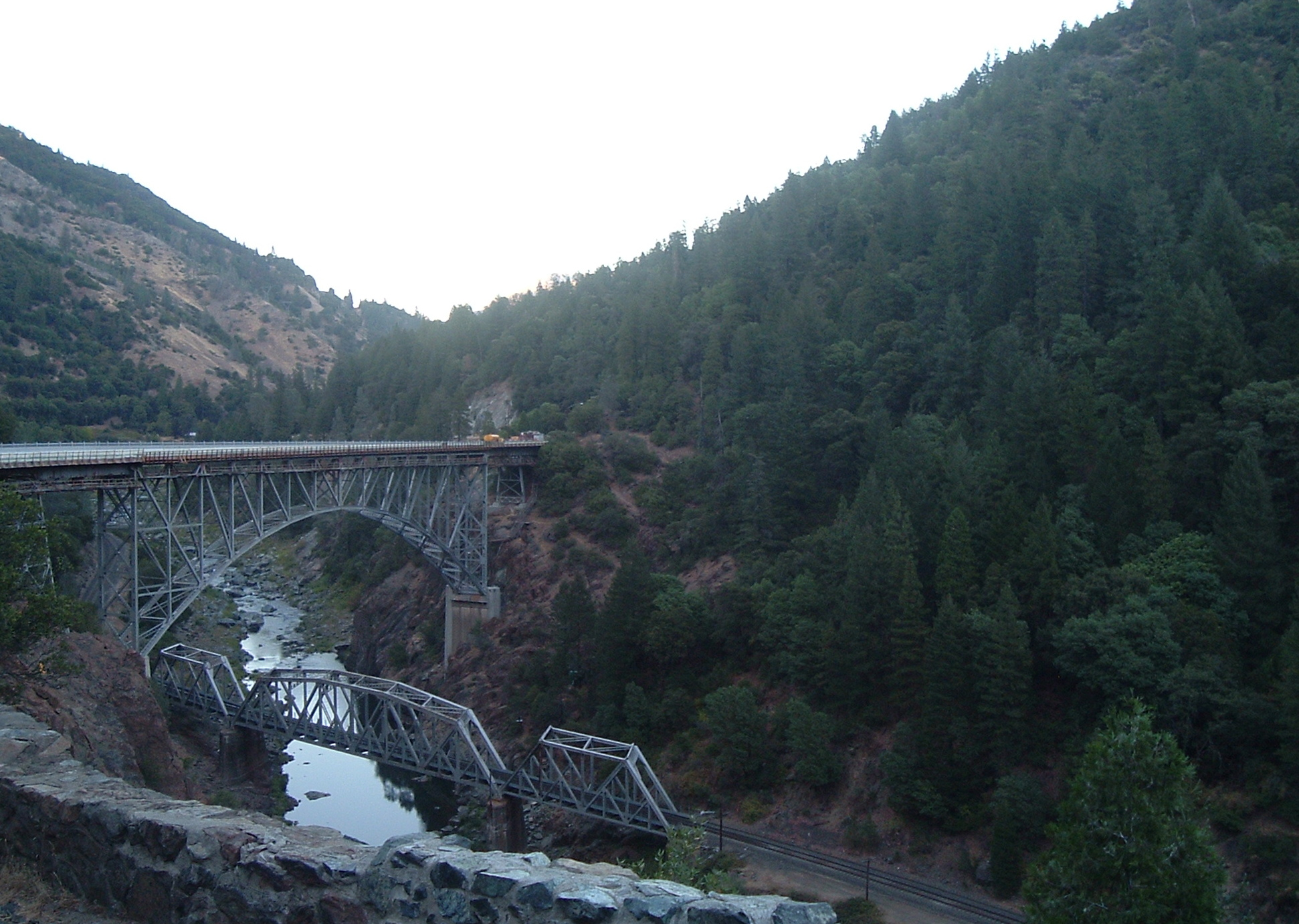
A rare example of a bridge crossing over another bridge: State Route 70 crosses over the railroad bridge, which crosses over the Feather River near Pulga.

=== Early history ===
Interest in building a transportation artery through the Feather River Canyon and across the deserts of Nevada and Utah began with the discovery of Beckwourth Pass, in the Sierra Nevada, in 1850. The pass, at 5,221 feet (1,591 m) in elevation, is the lowest pass through the Sierra Nevada. In the 1860s, Arthur W. Keddie began surveying in the Feather River Canyon, in order to find a suitable route for such an artery. He eventually found such a route, and helped to found the Oroville and Virginia City Railroad Company in 1867 to build a railroad along it. Political pressure from the Central Pacific Railroad, among other factors, led to the end of all construction efforts by 1869.

Throughout the 1870s and 1880s, little progress was made in forming a company to construct the railroad line. Some interest remained, because the proposed route was much less steep and passed through the Sierra Nevada at a point 2,000 feet (610 m) lower than that of the recently finished First transcontinental railroad, owned by the Central Pacific Railroad between Sacramento and Ogden, Utah. The Union Pacific Railroad, which terminated in Ogden at the time, considered building the line multiple times throughout this era to bypass the Central Pacific and access the Pacific Coast on its own. None of these proposals resulted in any level of action, and the idea was widely considered dead by the 1890s.

Interest in a line through the Feather River Canyon was renewed in 1900, when the Union Pacific Railroad, then led by E. H. Harriman, took control of the Southern Pacific Railroad. Subsequently, Harriman decided to close off access to the Southern Pacific to all railroads other than the Union Pacific, leaving all other railroads unable to access the Pacific Coast from Salt Lake City. Foremost among these railroads was the Denver and Rio Grande Western Railroad, the westernmost part of an 11,000-mile (18,000 km) transcontinental rail network organized by Jay Gould. Jay's son and successor, George Gould, decided to obtain access to the Pacific Coast. Hence, on April 3, 1903, the Western Pacific Railroad, backed heavily by Gould, was founded in San Francisco.

=== Construction ===
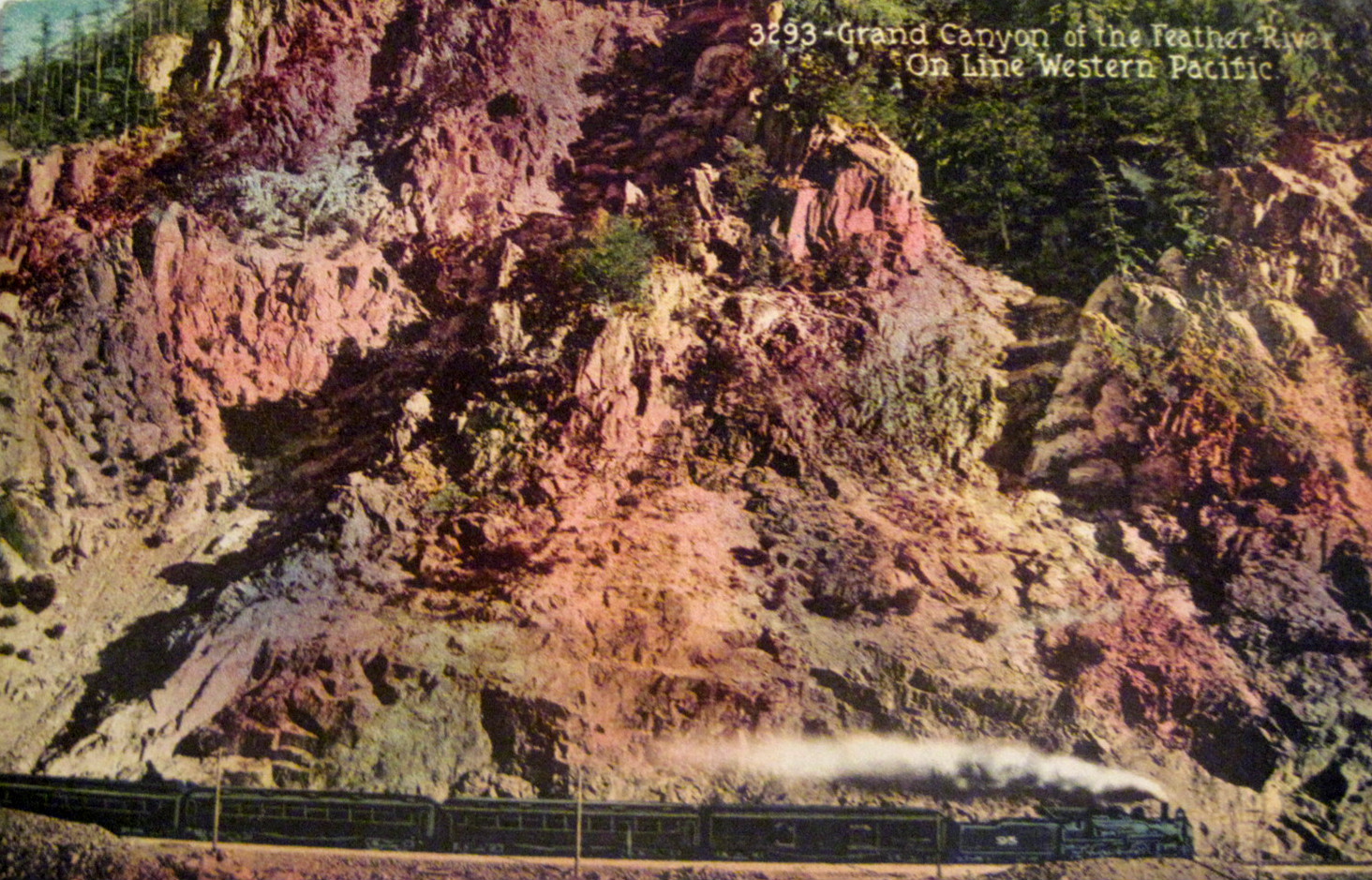
A Western Pacific passenger train in the Feather River canyon, c. 1910s

Construction of the line began in 1906 and continued under harsh conditions. In the Sierra, a total absence of roads, along with rockslides in the Feather River Canyon and extreme temperature fluctuation, made working conditions uncomfortable and dangerous. In the deserts of Nevada and Utah high temperature and lack of water made conditions similarly difficult. Construction costs skyrocketed, nearly bankrupting the contractors building the line. Labor turnover was extremely high, due to the miserable working conditions. Nonetheless, progress inched further, although slower than anticipated, due to the challenges caused by the need for many long tunnels on the Sierra portion of the route.

When the line was finished in 1909 it spanned a total of 927 miles (1,492 km), and had been built at the then ferociously expensive cost of $75 million (equivalent to $2.69 billion in 2025). It featured a ruling grade of 1%, making it only half as steep as Southern Pacific's Donner Pass line, its primary competitor.

=== History under the Western Pacific ===
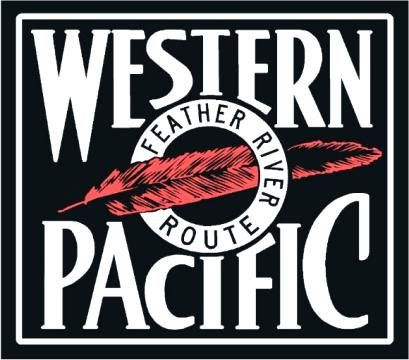
A Western Pacific Railroad logo, with the name of the Feather River Route.

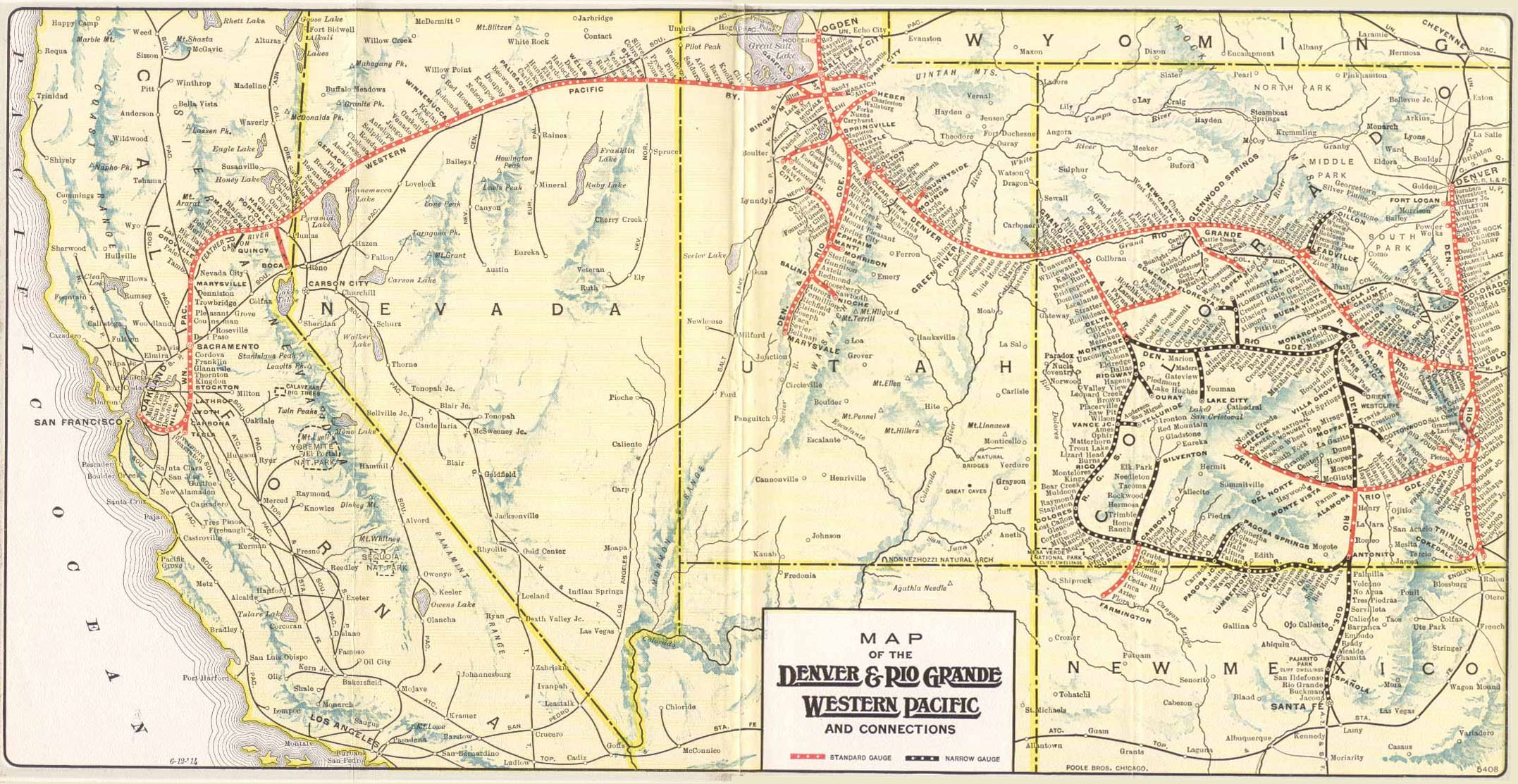
Combined Western Pacific/Denver & Rio Grande Western route map (c. 1914)

The traffic levels of the Feather River Route fluctuated considerably between its completion in 1909 and the purchase of the Western Pacific Railroad by the Union Pacific Railroad in 1983. Between 1909 and 1918, traffic rose with the onset of World War I, although such gains vanished in the 1920s and 1930s. The construction of the Inside Gateway line, completed in 1931 between Keddie and Bieber, California, failed to alleviate the problem. Yet in 1936, in spite of falling traffic, the Western Pacific rehabilitated the Feather River Route using RFC funds. As a result, the line was in optimal condition at the onset of World War II in 1939.

Traffic levels on the route exploded during the first year of the war. Freight traffic doubled, and passenger traffic increased sixfold. Traffic increased steadily in both categories over the next few years of the war. In response to this, the Western Pacific installed Centralized Traffic Control between Oroville and Portola, California, in the Sierra Nevada, during 1944 and 1945.

From the late 1940s through to the early 1970s, freight traffic on the line grew slowly, while passenger traffic fell substantially. This did not stop the Western Pacific from introducing the California Zephyr in 1949. The Zephyr, which operated over three railroads on its route between Oakland and Chicago, gained immense recognition but failed to last past the year 1970, when lack of riders and unprofitability forced the Western Pacific to abandon the service.

In 1957, a portion of the route between Oroville and Intake had to be relocated to make way for the Oroville Dam. The new line features the North Fork Bridge, which is 1,000 feet (300 m) long and 200 feet (61 m) high. The line began operation in 1962. During the 1970s, the Feather River Route experienced modernization, as operations became computerized.

=== Shared trackage agreement ===
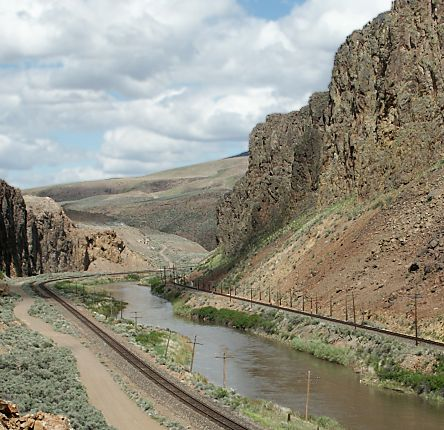
Palisade Canyon on the Humboldt River, between Battle Mountain and Carlin. The Feather River Route and Overland Route run parallel on opposite sides of the river

The Feather River Route parallels the Overland Route in central Nevada between Weso (near Winnemucca) and Alazon (near Wells). The Southern Pacific Railroad and Western Pacific came to a shared trackage agreement to use directional running. Eastbound trains of both companies used the tracks for the Feather River Route while westbound trains used the Overland Route. In the shared track area, the tracks mostly run on opposite sides of the Humboldt River; at some points the two lines are several miles apart. Crossovers were constructed where the lines run in close proximity to allow bi-directional service to the areas previously only accessible from one of the lines, such as Battle Mountain. There is a grade separated crossover of the two lines in the shared track area near Palisade, Nevada. This results in trains following right hand traffic in the eastern half of the shared track area, but left hand traffic in the western half.

By 1967, a second section of the Feather River Route was converted to directional running. The easternmost portion of the line (Shafter Subdivision), from the Kennecott Smokestack of the Bingham Canyon Mine smelting facilities to the end of the line in downtown Salt Lake City was operationally combined with the Lynndyl Subdivision of the former Los Angeles and Salt Lake Railroad for a continuous dual track into Salt Lake City. Initially this required a crossover between the two tracks. When the WP and UP merged in 1983, the crossover was eliminated.

=== Present ===
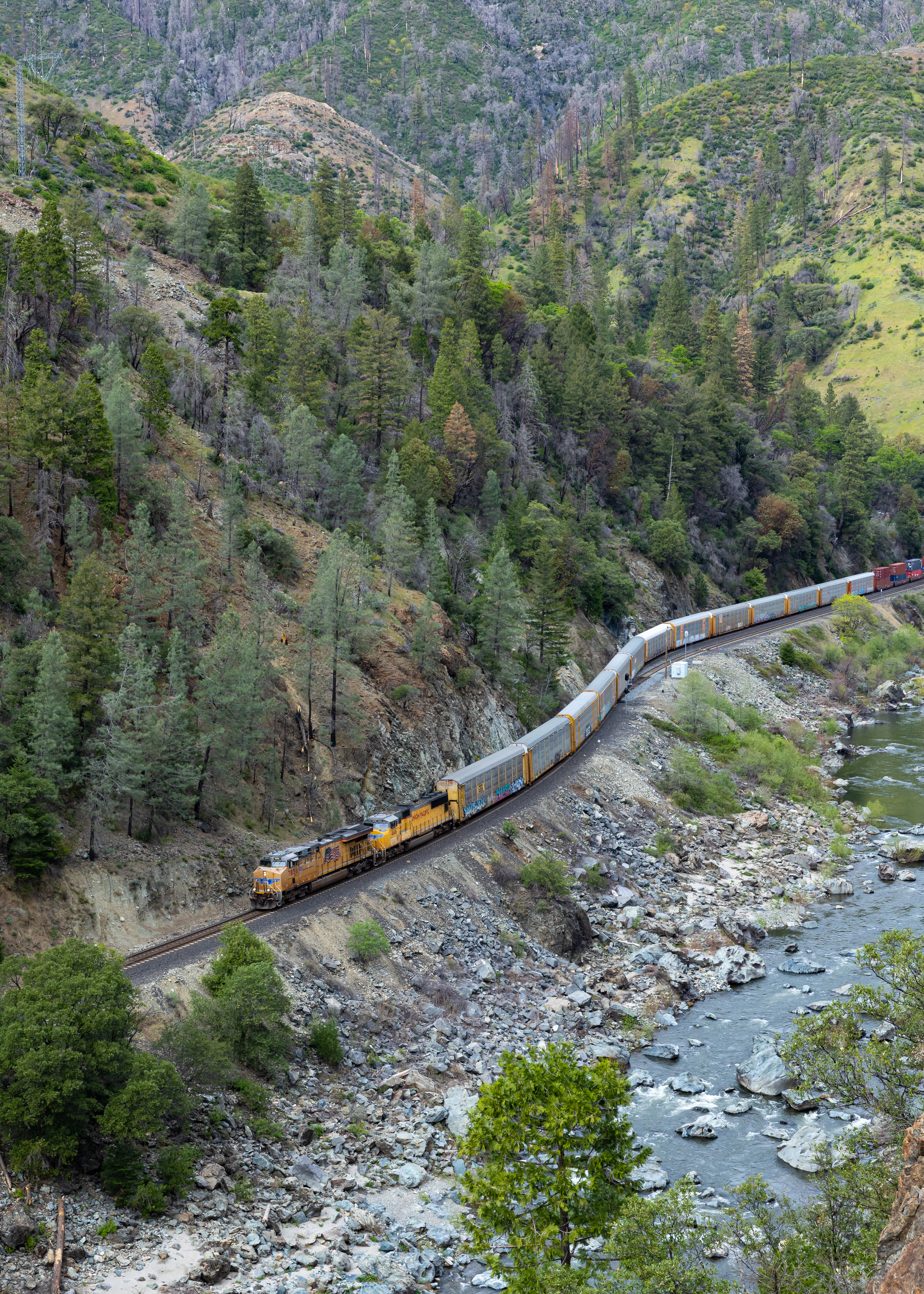
A Union Pacific freight train in the Feather River Canyon, Butte County, California, March 2022

The Western Pacific was purchased by the Union Pacific Railroad in 1983. In 1996, the Union Pacific acquired the Southern Pacific, resulting in both lines between Oakland and Utah being owned by the same company. After the acquisition, the Union Pacific truncated the Feather River Route to the meeting points of the two lines near Sacramento, California and Winnemucca, Nevada.

The far western portion of the line, west of Stockton, now the Oakland Subdivision, is now used by the Altamont Corridor Express. A portion of the line through downtown Sacramento is now used by the Blue Line of the Sacramento Regional Transit District. East of Winnemucca, the former Feather River Route has been combined with lines from the former Denver and Rio Grande Western Railroad to form the Central Corridor.

The Western Pacific Railroad Museum, a preservation society founded in 1984, is located next to the Union Pacific rail yard in Portola, California. The remaining portion of the Feather River Route follows a corridor similar to that of State Route 70 in California and former State Route 49 in Nevada.

== Lines served ==
- Oakland Subdivision (Oakland – ACE Maintenance Facility Stockton)
- Sacramento Subdivision (Stockton – Oroville)
- Canyon Subdivision (Oroville – Portola)
- Winnemucca Subdivision (Portola – Weso, Nevada (junction near Winnemucca, Nevada))
- Elko Subdivision (Weso – Elko Freight Yards)
- Shafter Subdivision (Elko – Smelter (Kennecott Smokestack))
- Lynndyl Subdivision (Smelter – Salt Lake City)

== Points of interest ==
- Lake Oroville
- Tobin Bridges
- Pulga Bridges
- Keddie Wye
- North Fork Bridge
- Williams Loop
- Spring Garden Tunnel
- Clio trestle
- Western Pacific Railroad Museum
- Beckwourth Pass / Chilcoot Tunnel
- Black Rock Desert

Along portions built as part of the Feather River Route that are currently assigned to other lines:

- Niles Canyon
- Altamont Pass
- Carlin Tunnel
- Flower Pass tunnel
- Arnold Loop/Silver Zone Pass
- Bonneville Salt Flats
- Saltair Resort

== See also ==
- Central Corridor (Union Pacific Railroad)
- Overland Route (Union Pacific Railroad)
