= Lehi station (Utah Southern Railroad) =

- Utah Southern Railroad Depot
- U.S. National Register of Historic Places
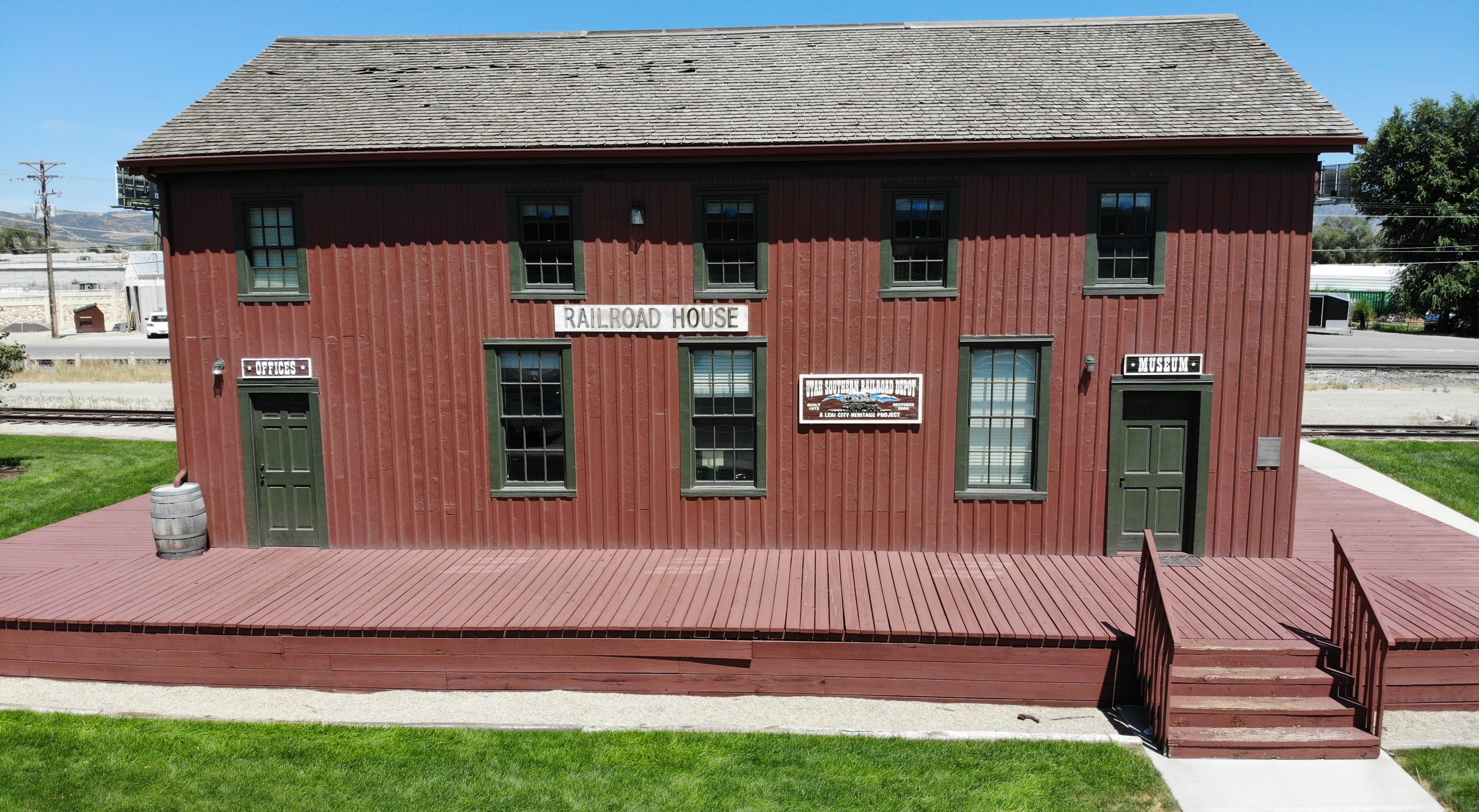

- Location within Utah Location within the United States
- Location: 225 E State St., Lehi, Utah
- Coordinates: 40.3965319°N 111.8457563°W
- Area: less than one acre
- Built: 1873
- NRHP reference No.: 94000536
- Added to NRHP: June 8, 1994

The Utah Southern Railroad Depot, located at 225 East State Street in Lehi, Utah, United States was built in c.1873. It has also been known as Oregon Short Line Railroad Depot, as Los Angeles & Salt Lake Railroad Depot, and as Union Pacific Railroad Depot. All of these names refer to railroad companies that were subsidiaries or acquisitions of the Union Pacific Railroad that used this depot. It was listed on the National Register of Historic Places (NRHP) in 1994.

== Description ==
The depot is a plain two-story wooden structure, but as of its NRHP nomination, it was significant as "one of only two remaining depots from the earliest decade of Utah's railroad history. In operation as a railroad depot for 100 years (it closed in 1973), the depot also served as a telegraph office and dancehall." It is "the second oldest standing depot west of the Mississippi [River]".

== Use of Generative AI ==
The Depot has received criticism over their use of Generative AI in their exhibits instead of real photographs and facts. This fact has drawn much attention due to a Youtube video uploaded on August 31st, 2026 and the Museum has received negative reviews on many sites and posts.

== See also ==
- National Register of Historic Places listings in Utah County, Utah
- Utah Southern Railroad (1871–81)
- Los Angeles and Salt Lake Railroad
- Oregon Short Line
