= Shafter Subdivision =

Rail line in Nevada and Utah

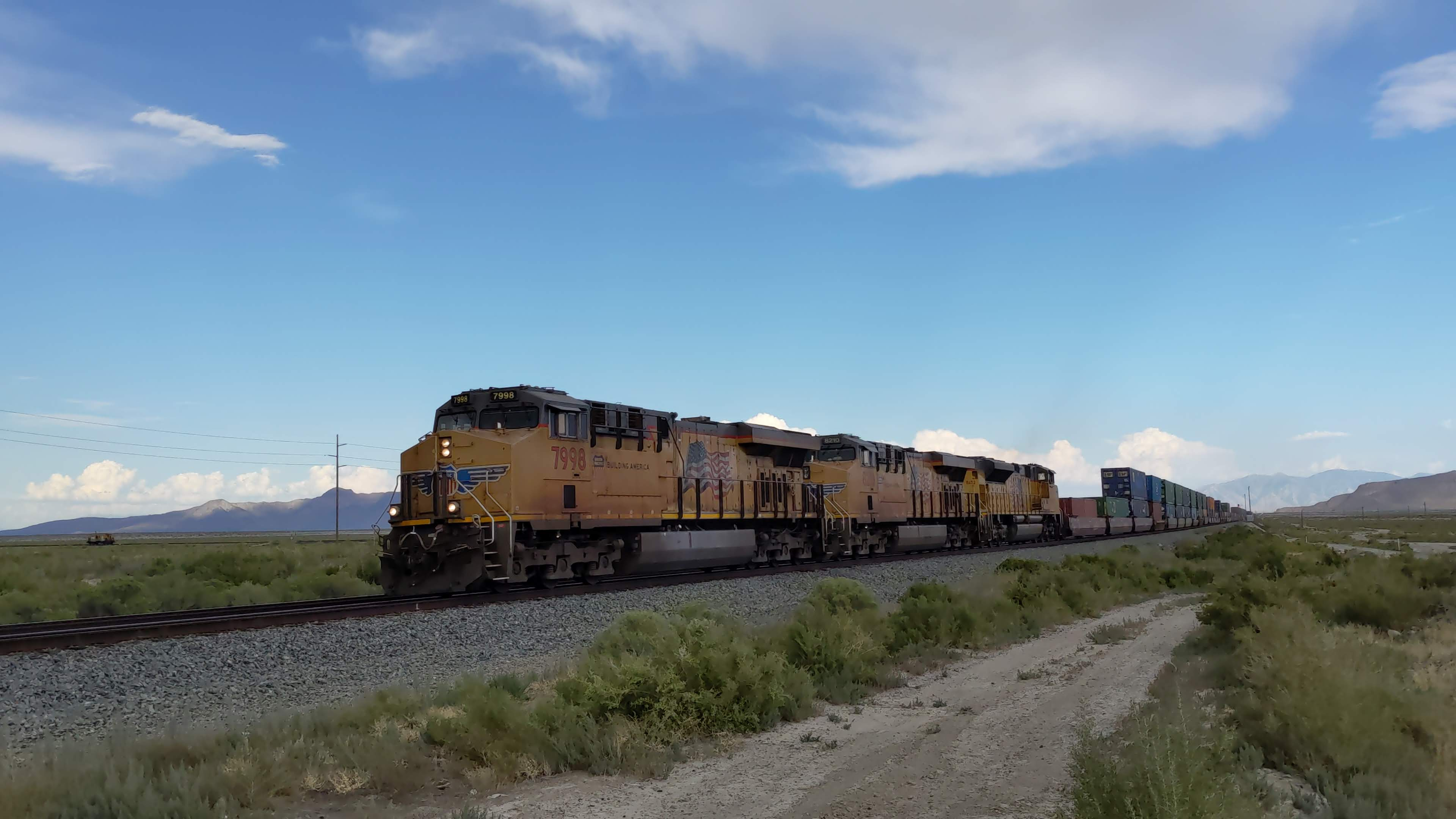
A train travels west on the Shafter Subdivision through Utah's West Desert, September 2023

The Shafter Subdivision is a rail line owned and operated by the Union Pacific Railroad in the U.S. states of Nevada and Utah. The line begins as a continuation of the Elko Subdivision at the Elko freight yards, and travels east to the junction with the Lynndyl Subdivision of the former Los Angeles and Salt Lake Railroad, adjacent to the Kennecott Smokestack. The line was formerly part of the Western Pacific Railroad. The entire subdivision is part of the Central Corridor; the portion west of Alazon (a switchover near Wells, Nevada) is also part of the Overland Route. Shafter is the name of the rail siding at the junction between this line and the Nevada Northern Railway.

== Route description ==
The route proceeds east from Elko, following the Humboldt River, where the line is part of both the Overland Route and Central Corridor, the two lines use directional running to share track, until the two routes separate at Alazon. From this point east, the Shafter Subdivision is only part of the Central Corridor, proceeding towards Salt Lake City. The Overland Route branches off as the Lakeside Subdivision towards Ogden, Utah. East of this separation, the Shafter Subdivision loosely follows the historical route of the Hastings Cutoff. The highest elevation attained along the route is 5,901 feet (1,799 m) at Hogan's Tunnel, under Flower Pass in the Pequop Mountains. The line also crosses the Toano Range at Silver Zone and has a near 360 degree horseshoe curve in the descent from Silver Zone Pass into the Great Salt Lake Desert. The line crosses from Nevada to Utah at Wendover, and proceeds due east across the Bonneville Salt Flats until reaching the Kennecott Smokestack in Garfield, where today the route ends with a junction with the Lynndyl Subdivision. Originally the line continued east of the smelter to downtown Salt Lake City, crossing and then running parallel to track built by the Los Angeles and Salt Lake Railroad. In May 1967, the Utah Department of Transportation relocated portions of the WP built track in the area to prepare for the construction of Interstate 80. As part of the relocation, the Western Pacific and the Union Pacific began sharing track between the smelter and Salt Lake. This resulted in both the western and eastern ends of the Shafter Subdivision using directional running with a formerly competing line. After the 1983 acquisition of the Western Pacific by the Union Pacific, the crossovers between the two lines were eliminated and the two lines were re-configured to make a single dual-track line and this portion of the Shafter Subdivision was completely absorbed by the Lynndyl Subdivision.
