= Utah Central Railroad (1869–1881) =

Defunct American railroad

The Utah Central Railroad was the first railroad in the U.S. state of Utah other than the main line of the First transcontinental railroad. Built by Mormons, it connected Salt Lake City to the transcontinental line at Ogden. It has since become part of the Union Pacific Railroad, which operates the line as the Salt Lake Subdivision; FrontRunner commuter rail tracks were added alongside the UP freight line in 2008.

== History ==
The company was incorporated in 1869, and completed the line in January 1870. At the time the First Transcontinental Railroad was being built, Brigham Young felt slighted by Union Pacific officials who had decided not to build the railroad through Salt Lake. "We want [the railroad] in this city where it belongs," he said on one occasion to the Mormons in Salt Lake, "the attempt to carry it in that [north] direction is an insult to the people of this city, for in so doing they have tried to shun us." Consequently, Brigham Young formed his own company, the Utah Central Railroad, in order to connect Salt Lake to the Transcontinental Railroad in Ogden, forty miles to the north.

Brigham Young did not attend the grand celebration at Promontory Summit on May 10, 1869, when the two lines crossing the continent met. He did, however, attend the groundbreaking ceremony for the Utah Central Railroad in Ogden held a week later on May 17, 1869, and pitched the first shovel-full of ground to symbolize that construction was officially underway. The following year, Young hammered in the final, commemorative spike, with the words "Holiness to the Lord" engraved upon it, at a special ceremony to celebrate the Utah Central Railroad's completion.

The Mormons were hired to grade the Union Pacific line through Utah during the closing months of the race to complete the transcontinental line. The UP was desperate to push as far westward as possible and collect government loans and land grants. However, UP refused to pay. (At the time, the company was effectively bankrupt). To settle the debt, the UP transferred rails and other supplies plus rolling stock to the Mormons. This provided the material for the Utah Central. See p. 372, Stephen E. Ambrose, "Nothing Like It in the World," 2000: "... Young bombarded the company headquarters in Boston with demands for payment in full. The UP had no money, but it did have equipment left over and Young was desperate to have a branch line, to be owned and controlled by the Mormons, running from Ogden to Salt Lake City. ... The UP gave the Mormons four thousand tons of iron rail ($480,000), 144 tons of spikes ($20,000), thirty-two tons of bolts ($5,600), four first-class passenger cars ($5,000 each), second-class cars, mail cars, flatcars and boxcars."

The Union Pacific Railroad gained control of the Utah Central Railroad in 1878, and in 1881 merged it with the Utah Southern Railroad and Utah Southern Railroad Extension to form the Utah Central Railway, a UP subsidiary that ran south from Ogden to Frisco. That company was subsequently merged with several others in 1889 to form the Oregon Short Line and Utah Northern Railway, which was reorganized as the Oregon Short Line Railroad in 1897. The OSL sold the lines south and west of Salt Lake City to the San Pedro, Los Angeles and Salt Lake Railroad in 1903, but kept the original Utah Central. The UP began direct operation of the line under lease in 1936, and in 1987 the OSL was merged into the UP.

== See also ==
- Utah and Northern Railway
