= Central Corridor (Union Pacific Railroad) =

Railway line in the Western United States

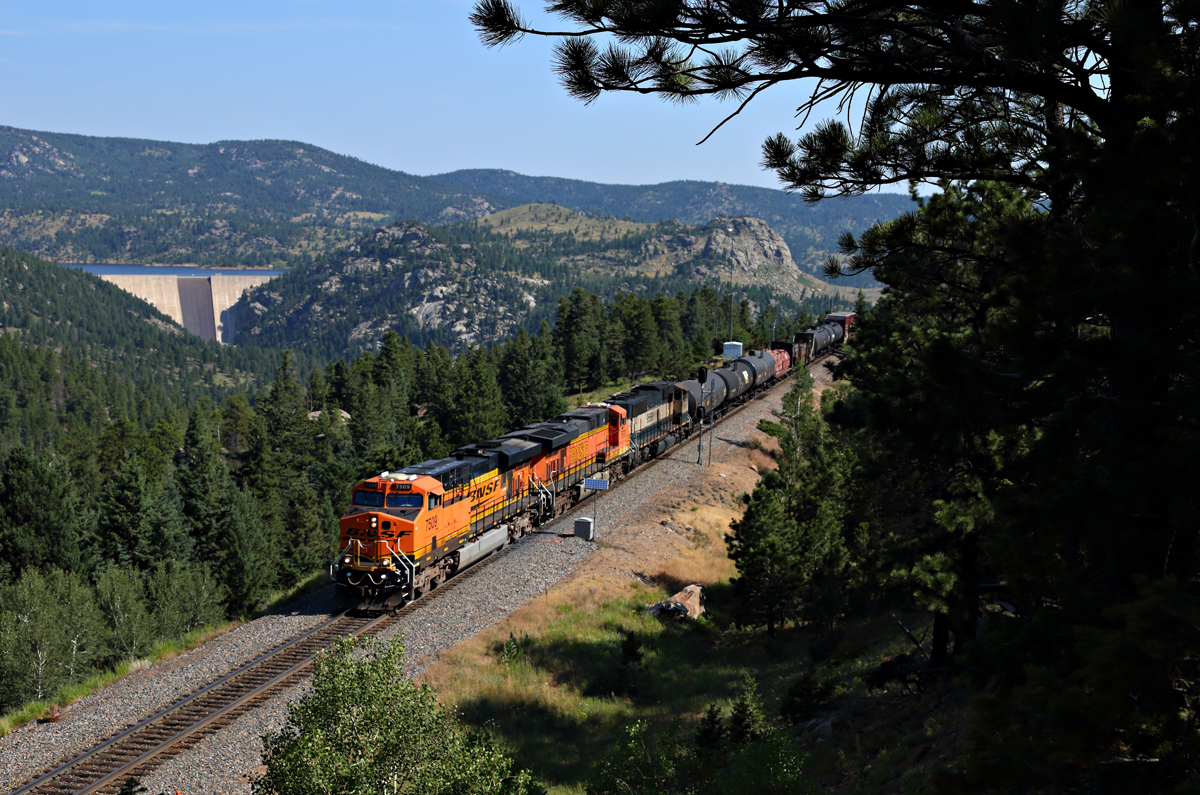
- A BNSF Railway freight train passes the Gross Dam on the Moffat Tunnel Subdivision

Overview
- Owner: Union Pacific Railroad; Utah Transit Authority (Salt Lake City–Provo)
- Locale: Western United States
- Termini: Denver; Winnemucca
- Connecting lines: Moffat Tunnel Subdivision; Glenwood Springs Subdivision; Green River Subdivision; Provo Subdivision; Lynndyl Subdivision; Shafter Subdivision; Elko Subdivision
- Stations: 20

Service
- Type: Inter-city rail; Freight rail; Commuter rail
- Operators: Union Pacific Railroad; BNSF Railway; Amtrak; Utah Railway; Utah Transit Authority

History
- Opened: 1996; 30 years ago

Technical
- Number of tracks: 1
- Track gauge: 4 ft 8 1/2 in (1,435 mm) standard gauge
- Train protection system: PTC

The Central Corridor is a rail line operated by the Union Pacific Railroad (UP) between Winnemucca, Nevada and Denver, Colorado in the western United States. The line was created in 1996 upon the UP's merger with the Southern Pacific by combining portions of lines built by UP's former competitors. It is known for significant feats of engineering including crossings of the Wasatch Mountains of Utah and the Rocky Mountains of Colorado, as well as its numerous tunnels, the longest and highest of which is the Moffat Tunnel.

== Usage ==
The line is primarily used by freight trains, including those of UP, BNSF (who has trackage rights over the entire line), and the Utah Railway (who has trackage rights between Salt Lake City and Grand Junction, Colorado). Amtrak's California Zephyr uses the entire length of the Central Corridor on its route between San Francisco and Chicago. In addition, the portion between Salt Lake City and Provo has a separate, dedicated track built by the Utah Transit Authority for the southern half of the FrontRunner commuter rail service, while a of the route northwest of Denver has dedicated electrified tracks for RTD commuter rail.

== Route description ==
=== Nevada ===
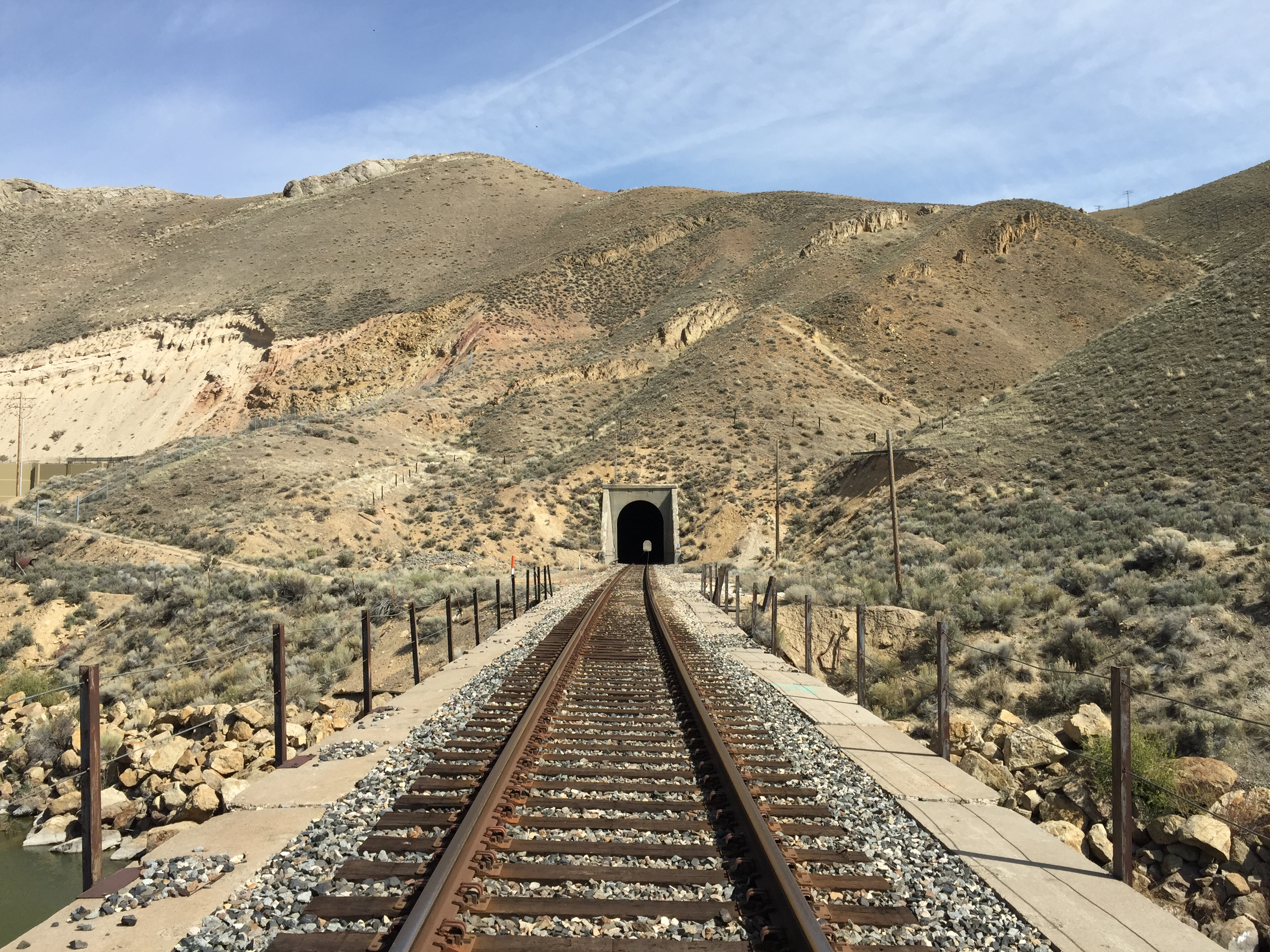
Western portal of the Carlin Tunnel

Proceeding east out of Winnemucca, the route follows the Humboldt River, in a directional running setup with the Overland Route until Wells, Nevada. From Wells to Salt Lake, the route, known as the Shafter Subdivision, loosely follows the historical route of the Hastings Cutoff, tunneling underneath the Pequop Mountains and crossing the Toano Range via Silver Zone Pass. The eastern approach to Silver Zone Pass features a horseshoe curve known as the Arnold loop. After crossing these mountain ranges the route proceeds southwest towards the Great Salt Lake Desert. In Nevada, Interstate 80 follows the Central Corridor, though the two routes are several miles apart in places.

=== Utah ===
The route enters Utah at Wendover and crosses the Great Salt Lake Desert and the Bonneville Salt Flats, parallel to Interstate 80 and the Wendover Cut-off, en route to the southern shore of the Great Salt Lake and Salt Lake City. Upon reaching Salt Lake City, the line turns south and follows the Jordan River through Point of the Mountain towards Spanish Fork.

After Spanish Fork, the rail line joins the U.S. Route 6 corridor, and the two follow each other towards Denver. Both routes follow the Spanish Fork (river) up a grade in the Wasatch Plateau, cresting at Soldier Summit. The western approach to Soldier Summit is known for the Gilluly loops, a series of horseshoe curves that allow the railroad to crest the mountains while maintaining grade that never exceeds 2.4%, unlike the highway, which was built using an older railroad grade, that features grades in excess of 5%. The railroad descends from Soldier Summit following the Price River until reaching the town of Helper, so named because in the era of steam locomotives, the railroad added or removed helper engines here for trains crossing Soldier Summit. Upon exiting the Wasatch Mountains, the train follows the southern rim of the Book Cliffs, in route serving the towns of Woodside, Green River (where the rail line crosses the Green River), Thompson Springs and Cisco. Near Cisco is where the rail line for the first time meets the Colorado River, which provides the path up the Rocky Mountains in Colorado. The rail line follows and crosses the river numerous times in Colorado while ascending the Rockies. Ruby Canyon is where the rail line reaches the state line.

=== Colorado ===
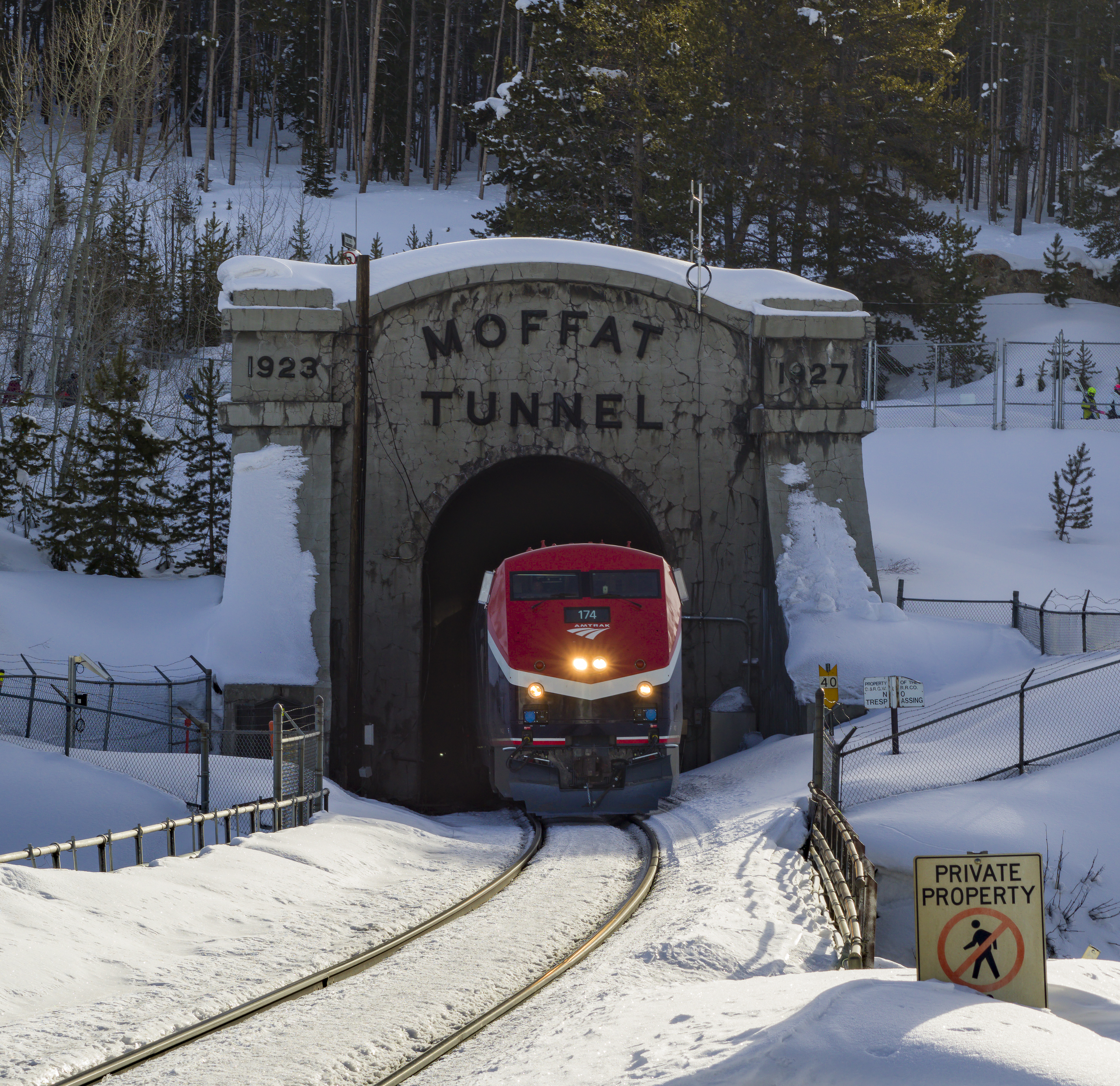
GE Genesis An Amtrak train emerging from the west portal of the Moffat Tunnel on the Central Corridor

The railroad enters Colorado along the north bank of the Colorado River, following it to the Grand Valley, passing through the heart of Grand Junction and surrounding cities along the way. The tracks continue to follow the river out of the valley, routed along Debeque Canyon, Glenwood Canyon and Gore Canyon of the Colorado River towards Granby, Colorado near the headwaters of the river. The railroad departs the main stem of the Colorado river to follow the Fraser River, one of its tributaries until reaching the crest of the Rocky Mountains which is surmounted via the Moffat Tunnel. With the decommissioning of the route over Tennessee Pass, the Moffat Tunnel is the highest point on the Union Pacific system.

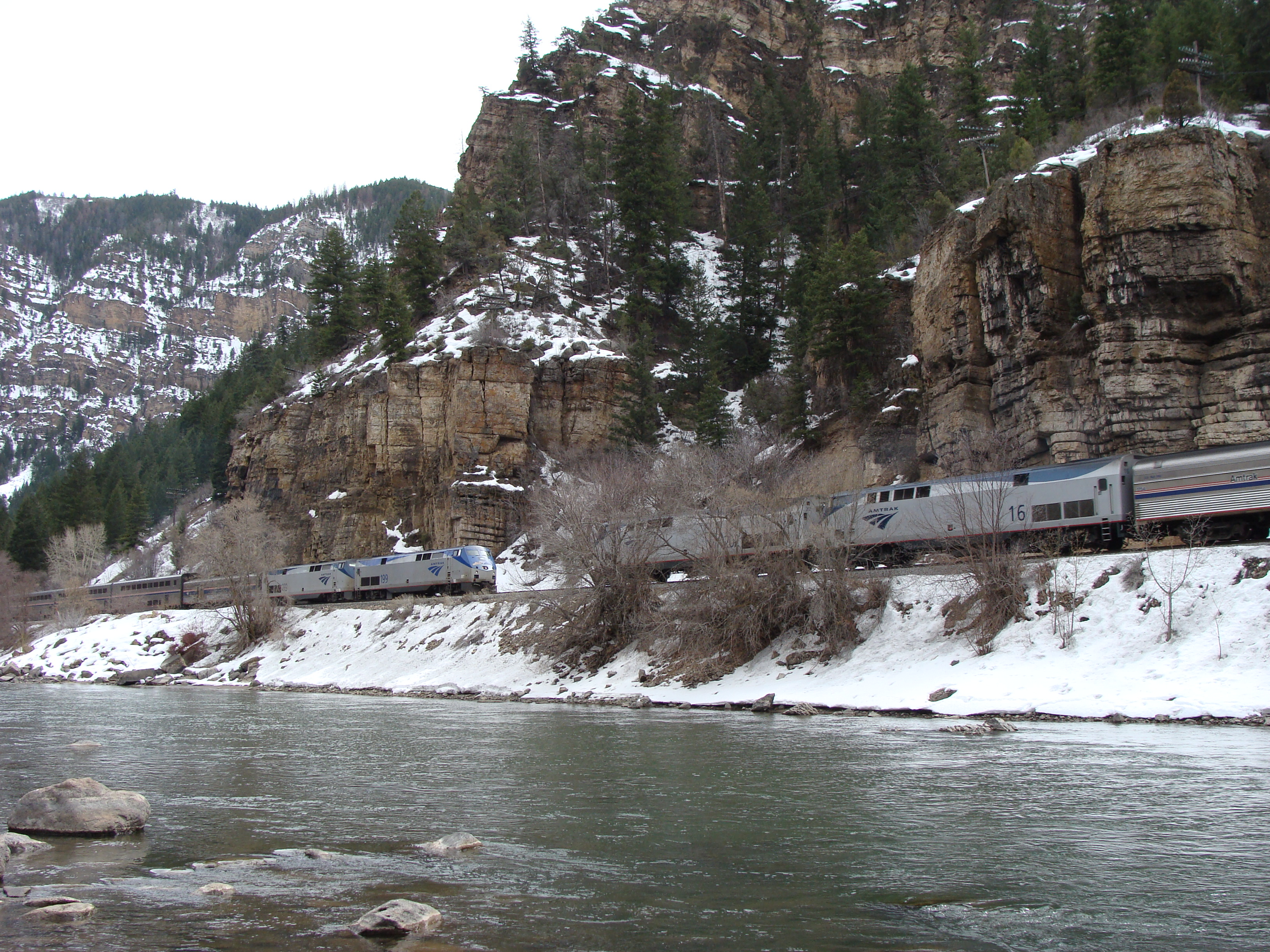
Amtrak's California Zephyrs eastbound and westbound meeting in the Glenwood Canyon Siding

The eastern descent from the Moffat Tunnel towards the Front Range and Denver features 33 tunnels, leading to this portion being commonly called the Tunnel District. This portion of the tracks loosely follows Colorado State Highway 72, though at points the two corridors are in different canyons and several miles apart. Even past where the tracks exit the Rocky Mountains, the grade features horseshoe curves in the final descent. The tracks approach the Denver metropolitan area from the northwest, before merging with other rail lines just north of downtown Denver.

== Subdivisions ==
The Central Corridor comprises seven subdivisions:

- Moffat Tunnel Subdivision: Denver–Bond
- Glenwood Springs Subdivision: Bond–Grand Junction
- Green River Subdivision: Grand Junction–Helper
- Provo Subdivision: Helper–Salt Lake City
- Lynndyl Subdivision: Salt Lake City–Smelter (adjacent to the Kennecott Smokestack)
- Shafter Subdivision: Smelter–Elko
- Elko Subdivision: Elko–Winnemucca

== History ==
The entirety of the Central Corridor was built by former competitors of the Union Pacific—in some cases specifically to compete with the UP's Overland Route:

- Winnemucca–Salt Lake City: originally part of the Feather River Route, built by the Western Pacific Railroad and acquired by the Union Pacific in 1983
- Salt Lake City–Grand Junction: former Utah Division of the Denver and Rio Grande Western (D&RGW)
- Grand Junction–Dotsero: part of the Tennessee Pass line, also built by the D&RGW
- Dotsero–Bond: former Dotsero Cutoff, built by the D&RGW as a connection between their main line and the unfinished Denver and Salt Lake Railroad, which provided the final connection between Bond and Denver

The portion east of Salt Lake City came under the UP's control with the 1996 acquisition of the Southern Pacific Transportation Company. BNSF obtained trackage rights along the entire Central Corridor in 1996, in exchange for not objecting to the UP–SP merger. The Western Pacific and D&RGW portions of the line were part of the Gould transcontinental system.

=== Role in Uinta Basin Rail project ===
The Central Corridor was at the center of controversy in 2022–23 due to the Uinta Basin Rail project in Utah, which would have added trains to the Corridor carrying waxy-crude oil. The project also proposed reactivating the Dotsero–Pueblo Tennessee Pass line (which had been out of service since 1997) to bypass the Central Corridor should it reach capacity.

Eagle County and environmental groups lobbied against the project, citing the increased risk for a major derailment and subsequent oil spill into the Colorado River (which runs along the Central Corridor) or the Arkansas River (which runs along the Tennessee Pass line). Eagle County's opposition to the project led to the Supreme Court ruling Seven County Infrastructure Coalition v. Eagle County, which focused on an appeal court's interpretation of the National Environmental Policy Act (NEPA) that had paused the project. In an 8–0 ruling, the court ruled against Eagle County, stating that potential environmental impacts outside the project's construction limits in Utah were not within the scope of an environmental impact statement as prescribed by NEPA.

== See also ==
- Feather River Route
- Overland Route (Union Pacific Railroad)
