= Salt Lake City Southern Railroad =

Overview
- Headquarters: Murray, Utah
- Reporting mark: SL
- Locale: Salt Lake City, Utah; United States
- Dates of operation: April 19, 1993–Present

The Salt Lake City Southern Railroad (reporting mark SL) is a 25-mile (40 km) short-line railroad operating between Salt Lake City, and Murray, in Utah, United States. The SL began operating on April 19, 1993, as a RailTex subsidiary. Today the SL is a subsidiary of the Utah Railway and is owned by the Genesee & Wyoming Inc.

== History ==
The line was originally built between 1871 and 1872 by the Utah Southern Railroad. By March 30, 1872, the Utah Southern reached Point of the Mountain, which is the southern end of the Salt Lake City Southern Railroad at Mount. In the 1870s, the Utah Southern was constructing a 105-mile (169 km) line from Salt Lake City to Chicken Creek (Juab County). Brigham Young was listed as the railroad's president. In June 1875 financial control of the railroad was turned over to the Union Pacific Railroad.

On July 1, 1881, the Utah Southern was consolidated into the Utah Central Railway. The Utah Central was building a rail network from Ogden–Milford. By 1888 the Utah Central was an operating subsidiary of the Union Pacific Railroad.

On August 1, 1889, the Utah Central was consolidated into the Oregon Short Line and Utah Northern Railway, an operating subsidiary of the Union Pacific. On March 1, 1897, the railway was renamed the Oregon Short Line Railroad (OSL). The OSL, a UP subsidiary, was leased to the UP on January 1, 1936.

From 1936 to 1993 the Union Pacific operated the tracks as part of their "Provo Subdivision." In the 1990s the UP shifted its trains on the Provo Subdivision to the Denver and Rio Grande Western Railroad tracks between Salt Lake City and American Fork. The UP no longer needed the line between Salt Lake City and Mount (also known as Mound or Point of the Mountain).

RailTex acquired the line between Salt Lake City and Mount and began operations in 1993 as the Salt Lake City Southern Railroad. Today the Utah Transit Authority (UTA light rail) owns much of the track as part of their light rail right-of-way acquisitions. UTA utilized the right-of-way for its TRAX light rail system, and is used, at least in part, by all three of its TRAX lines (Blue, Green, and Red, but primarily the Blue Line). The SL operates over the UTA tracks via trackage rights.

On September 30, 1999, the SL became a subsidiary of the Utah Railway.

== Sources ==
- "Genesee & Wyoming, Inc.: Utah Region". gwrr.com. Archived from the original on 9 June 2007 – via web.archive.org.
- Stindt, Fred A. (1996). American Shortline Railway Guide (5th ed.). Waukesha, Wisconsin: Kalmbach Publishing. pp. 272–273. ISBN 0-89024-290-9.
- Strack, Don (2004). "Salt Lake City Southern Railroad" (PHP). utahrails.net.
- Walker, Mike (1999). SPV's Comprehensive Railroad Atlas of North America—Colorado & Utah. Faversham, Kent, United Kingdom: Steam Powered Publishing. pp. 39, 41, & 45. ISBN 1-874745-03-X.
