= Lynndyl Subdivision =

Rail line in Utah

The Lynndyl Subdivision is a rail line owned and operated by the Union Pacific Railroad (UP) in the U.S. state of Utah, running from Salt Lake City southwest to Milford, where the Caliente Subdivision continues towards Los Angeles. It was formerly part of the Los Angeles and Salt Lake Railroad and a section currently forms a segment of Union Pacific's Central Corridor. The subdivision is named for Lynndyl, a small community along the rail line. The highest elevation attained on the line is 6,061 feet (1,847 m) at Tintic. As of 2003 the line sees 16 trains daily between Lynndyl and Smelter (where the Shafter Subdivision splits to the west).

== History ==
Mormon businessmen incorporated the Utah Southern Railroad in 1871 to build a standard gauge line from Salt Lake City south to Payson. It was built by the construction company Grover, McCune & Read, a firm owned by Alfred W. McCune and two other Utah businessmen. It was completed to that city and beyond to York (south of Santaquin) in 1875, and bought by the Union Pacific Railroad later that year. The UP organized the Utah Southern Railroad Extension in 1879, and completed the line to Frisco in 1880. Both companies merged with the Utah Central Railroad (Salt Lake City-Ogden) to form the UP-controlled Utah Central Railway in 1881, and in 1889 it was merged with the Utah and Northern Railway and other companies to form the Oregon Short Line and Utah Northern Railway, which was reorganized as the Oregon Short Line Railroad in 1897.

The Salt Lake, Sevier Valley and Pioche Railroad was incorporated in 1872 to build west from Salt Lake City, and the Utah Western Railway, organized in 1874, acquired its unfinished roadbed and completed the 3 ft (914 mm) narrow gauge line to a point near Stockton in 1877. The company was reorganized in 1881 as the Utah and Nevada Railway, and the UP gained control later that year, merging it into the Oregon Short Line and Utah Northern Railway in 1889. The Oregon Short Line later converted the track to 4 ft 8 1/2 in (1,435 mm) standard gauge and extended the line south to the old Utah Southern at Lynndyl, west of Leamington. This new Leamington Cut-off, completed in 1903, had better grades and alignment than the old route through Payson, which became a secondary route (and is now, where still in use, the Sharp Subdivision). The San Pedro, Los Angeles and Salt Lake Railroad, half-owned by the OSL, bought the OSL's lines south and west of Salt Lake City later that year, and completed the line to Los Angeles in 1905. The short piece of the old line from Milford, where the new Los Angeles line left, west to Frisco became the Frisco Branch, and was abandoned in 1943. After the UP bought the Western Pacific Railroad in 1983, the two parallel lines between Salt Lake City and Garfield, where the ex-WP Shafter Subdivision now begins, were converted to a directional running setup.
