= Utah and Northern Railway =

Former American railroad company

Utah & Northern Railway
Overview
- Headquarters: Ogden, Utah
- Locale: Ogden, Utah, to Butte, Montana
- Dates of operation: 1871–1889

Technical
- Track gauge: 4 ft 8 1/2 in (1,435 mm) standard gauge
- Previous gauge: originally 3 ft (914 mm) gauge

The Utah & Northern Railway is a defunct railroad that was operated in the Utah Territory and later in the Idaho Territory and Montana Territory in the western United States during the 1870s and 1880s. It was the first railroad in Idaho and in Montana. The line was acquired by a Union Pacific Railroad subsidiary, the Oregon Short Line, and is today operated by the Union Pacific Railroad as the Ogden Subdivision (Ogden to McCammon, Idaho), part of the Pocatello Subdivision (McCammon to Pocatello, Idaho), and the Montana Subdivision (Pocatello to Butte, Montana).

== History ==
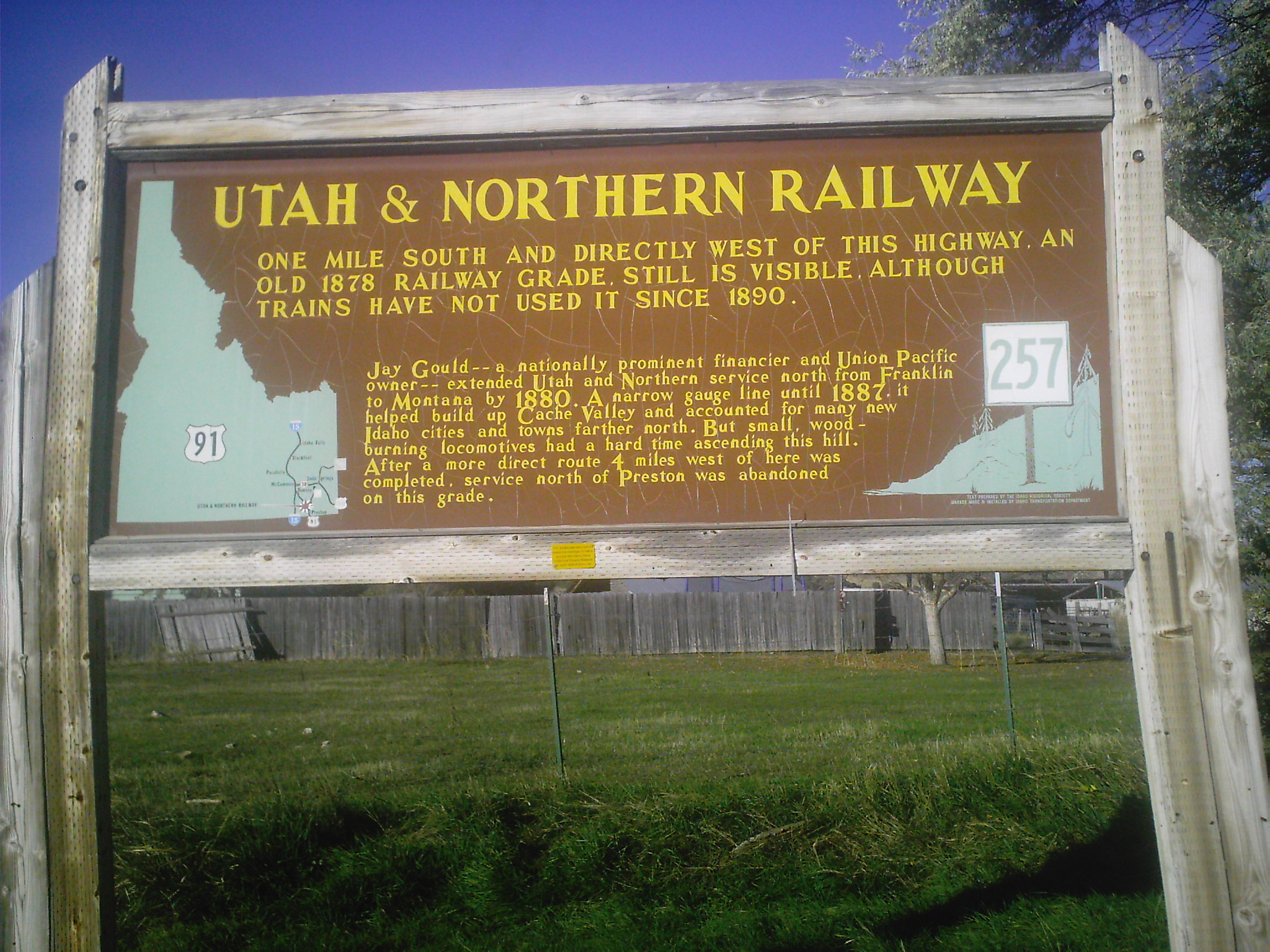
Roadside marker noting route of Utah and Northern Railway through Franklin County, Idaho

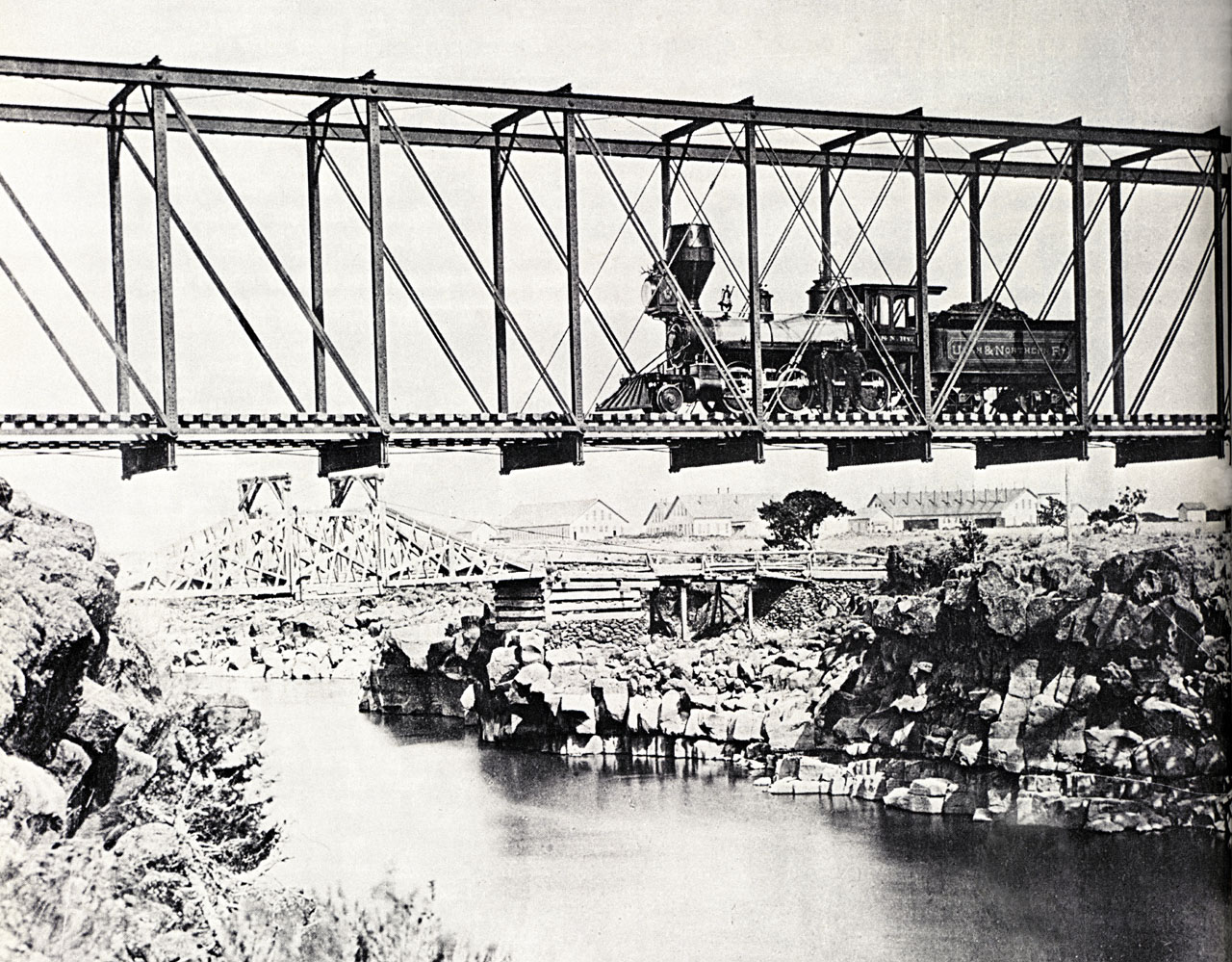
Utah and Northern Bridge at Eagle Rock (Idaho Falls), Idaho c. 1880 with railroad shops in background

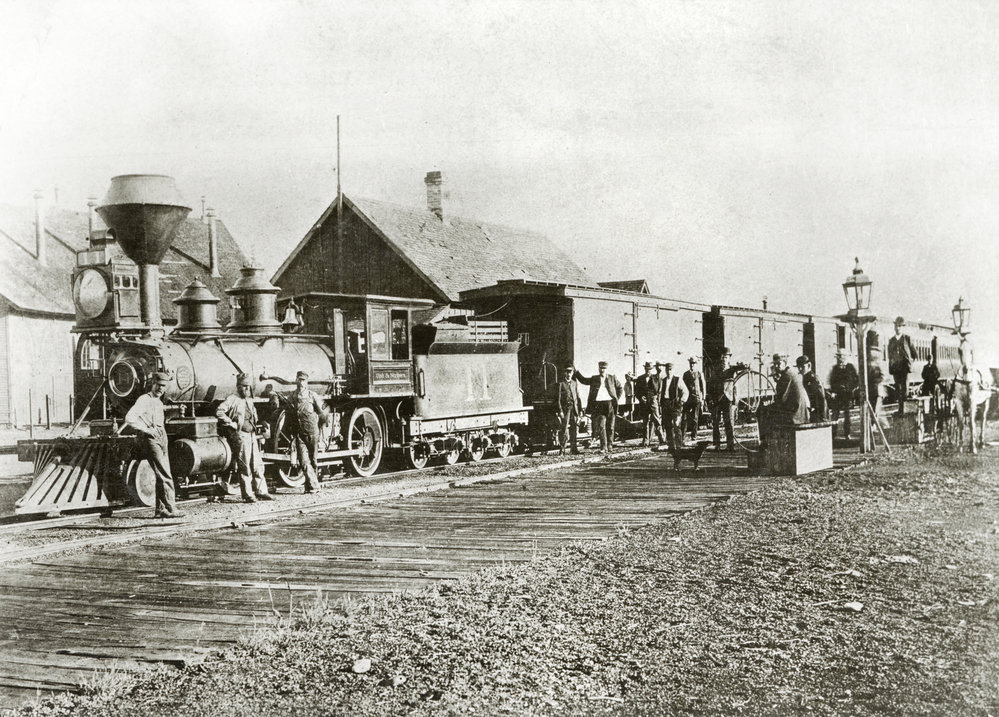
Logan, Utah, 1885

The original 75 miles (121 km) of the Utah Northern Railroad (later named Utah & Northern Railway) was conceived and built by the Mormons. It was a 3 ft (914 mm) narrow gauge spur off the Union Pacific portion of the transcontinental railroad. The labor for this railroad was largely volunteer Mormon labor as the intent of the railroad was to serve the Mormon communities in the Cache Valley that had been settled almost entirely by the Mormons. It was a case of Mormons forming a company and building their own railroad because existing railroad companies showed no interest in building such a railroad. The northern half of the Cache Valley is in Idaho and, due to claims and disputes by the Shoshone and Bannock Indians, was not settled by the Mormons until after the Bear River Massacre and subsequent Fort Bridger Treaty of 1868 that forced the Shoshone and Bannock onto reservations. The original Mormon plan for the Utah Northern was to build a railroad to the communities in the Cache Valley and about 60 miles (97 km) into Idaho to Soda Springs, Idaho, that lies in a valley beyond called the Bear River Valley. This was by dictate of Brigham Young as he owned land in Soda Springs and believed that the Bear River Valley had potential for further Mormon settlement. The Mormons also believed they could break the monopoly that the anti-Mormon town of Corinne, Utah, had on the wagon freight business on the Montana Trail by extending the railroad into Idaho. There were tentative plans to eventually extend the Utah Northern to Montana. The road was constructed northward from the Union Pacific line at Ogden commencing construction on August 24, 1871. In three years, the largely volunteer railroad company had built 75 miles (121 km) of road. It reached Franklin, Idaho, across the Idaho border, in May 1874 where construction was halted. Investors had become hesitant after the panic of 1873 and the railroad was now moving into the northern half of the Cache Valley where there were fewer Mormon volunteers due to this area only recently having been relinquished by the Bannock and Shoshone. Poor decisions by the planners and the lack of business from the frugal residents of the Cache Valley led to the bankruptcy and foreclosure sale of the Utah Northern only a few years later in 1878.

Robber baron Jay Gould transformed the Utah Northern. He and Union Pacific acquired the Utah Northern Railroad, changing the name to the Utah & Northern Railway and infused the railroad with capital. Big business knew that an electrical age was coming and that the demand for copper products was putting pressure on copper prices. They knew that there were rich copper deposits at the mines near Butte, Montana. Union Pacific quickly resumed construction on the Utah & Northern Railway after purchase in April 1878. Jay Gould invested personal money to get construction started just beyond Franklin in the fall of 1877. The new plan was not to build the road to Soda Springs, but to build a longer road on a direct route through the Cache Valley, then north across eastern Idaho and north across western Montana to Butte, Montana. In the first year of construction, they reached Eagle Rock (now Idaho Falls, Idaho), 120 miles (190 km) north of the Utah/Idaho border, where they built a bridge across the Snake River in early 1879. In the second year, they added another 90 miles (140 km) of track and crossed the continental divide at the Idaho/Montana border. After three and a half years of construction, before the close of 1881, they completed the additional 120 miles (190 km) of road to Butte, Montana. Butte became the largest copper producing city in the world and Butte's population, by some estimates, grew to nearly 100,000. This made Butte, with its "Copper Kings," the second largest city in the West with more influence than Salt Lake City, Denver, Sacramento, Seattle, or Portland. Only San Francisco remained larger and more important. Butte, with its large-scale mining and smelting operations, was dubbed the Pittsburg of the West.

The Utah & Northern was switched from 3 ft (914 mm) narrow gauge to 4 ft 8 1/2 in (1,435 mm) standard gauge on July 25, 1887 only six years after completing the line to Butte. The railroad operated successfully for several years and finally became a branch of the Union Pacific Railroad.

== See also ==
- Utah Central Railroad (1869–81)
- Utah Southern Railroad (1871–81)
- Butte, Anaconda and Pacific Railway
