= Riverside station (Union Pacific Railroad) =

Former railway station in Riverside, California

Riverside
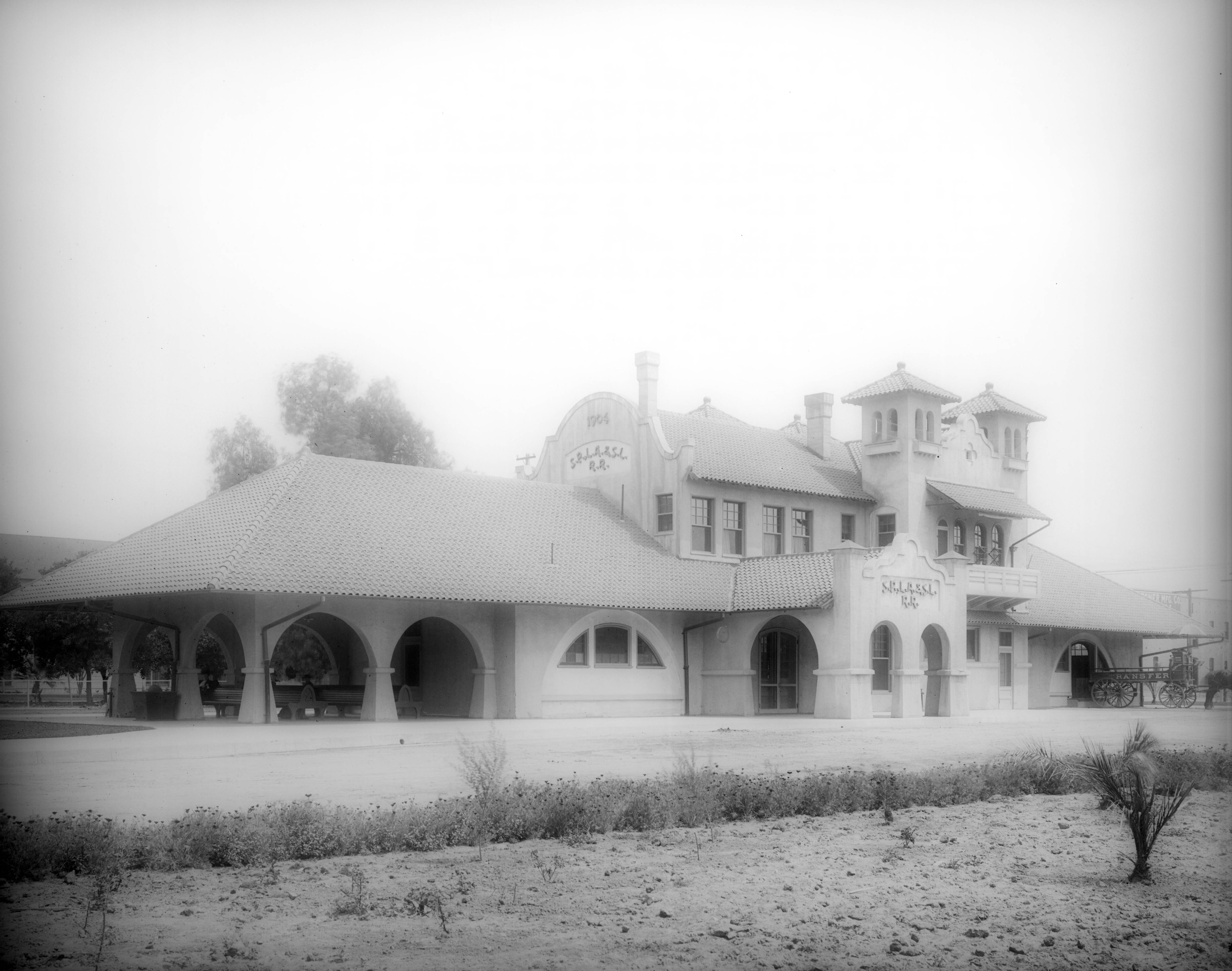
- The station building, c. 1910

General information
- Location: 3751 Vine Street; Riverside, California
- Owner: San Pedro, Los Angeles and Salt Lake Railroad (1904–1921); Union Pacific Railroad (1921–)

History
- Opened: 1904
- Closed: May 2, 1971

Former services
Preceding station	Union Pacific Railroad	Following station
Mira Loma toward Los Angeles	Los Angeles and Salt Lake Railroad	Highgrove toward Salt Lake City
- San Pedro, Los Angeles, & Salt Lake RR Depot
- U.S. National Register of Historic Places
- Coordinates: 33.979825°N 117.368562°W
- Built: 1904
- Built by: San Pedro, Los Angeles and Salt Lake Railroad
- NRHP reference No.: 77000326
- Added to NRHP: April 18, 1977
Location

Riverside Depot is a former train station in Riverside, California.

== History ==
The station was constructed in 1904 by the San Pedro, Los Angeles and Salt Lake Railroad along their route to Los Angeles. Union Pacific Railroad acquired the line on Vine Street along with the station in 1921. Local Pacific Electric streetcars served the station via a terminal at 7th and Vine until 1924. Passenger service ceased in 1971 when Amtrak took over intercity passenger service in the United States. The final trips of the City of Los Angeles serving the station were on April 30 eastbound and May 2 westbound.

The depot was listed on the National Register of Historic Places on April 18, 1977 as San Pedro, Los Angeles, & Salt Lake RR Depot. Metrolink commuter rail service to Riverside began in 1993, followed by Amtrak in 2002; both use Riverside–Downtown station near the former Santa Fe Railroad station.
