= Goshute Mountains =

Mountain range in Elko County, Nevada, US

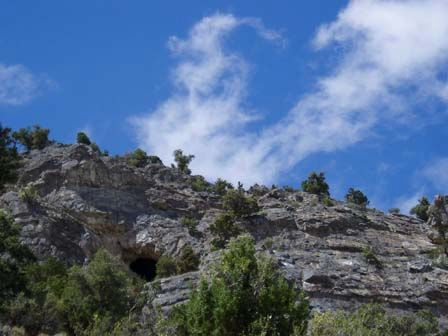

Highest point
- Elevation: 2,151 m (7,057 ft)

Geography
- Location within Nevada Location within the United States
- Country: United States
- State: Nevada
- District: Elko County
- Range coordinates: 40°16′9.758″N 114°16′33.052″W
- Topo map: USGS White Horse Mountain

The Goshute Mountains is a mountain range in southeastern Elko County, Nevada, United States.

== Description ==
The range is separated from the Toano Range to the north by Morgan Pass.

The range was named after the Goshute Indians.

== See also ==
- List of mountain ranges of Nevada
