= Toano Range =

Mountain range in Elko County, Nevada, US

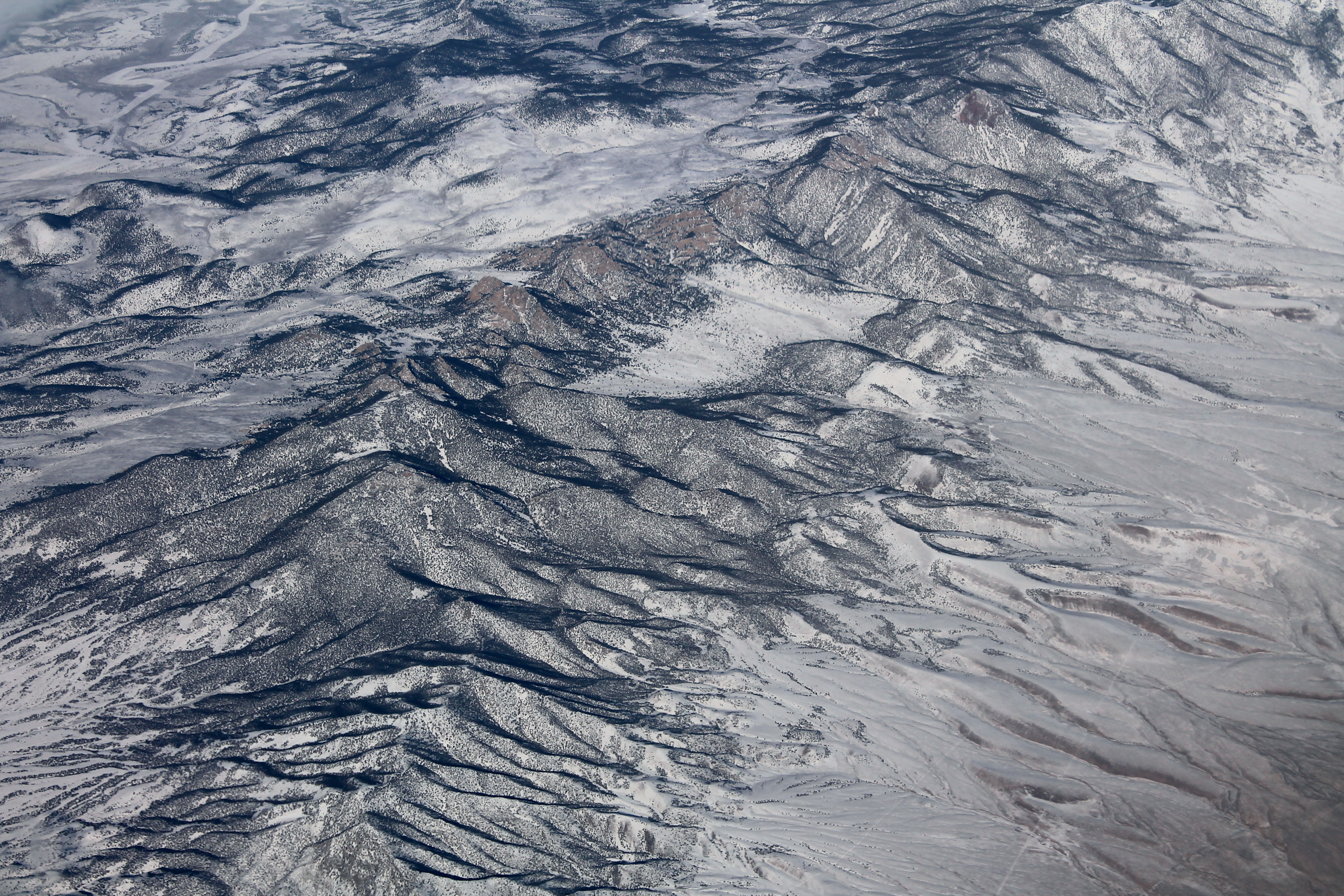
- Aerial view of Toano Range

Highest point
- Coordinates: 40°58′36″N 114°18′32″W

Dimensions
- Length: 13 mi (21 km) SSW to NNE
- Width: 4 mi (6.4 km)
- Area: 56 mi^{2} (150 km^{2})

Geography
- Location within Nevada
- Country: United States
- State: Nevada

The Toano Range is a mountain range located in eastern Elko County, Nevada, in the United States. The highest point in the range reaches 7,913 feet (2,412 m). The range is separated from the Goshute Mountains to the south by Morgan Pass.

Interstate 80 and Union Pacific Railroad's Central Corridor (former Feather River Route), used both by freight trains and Amtrak's California Zephyr, cross the Toano range via Silver Zone Pass. On the eastern approach to the pass the railroad makes a near 360 degree hairpin bend called the Arnold Loop.

Toano is a name derived from the Shoshoni language meaning "pipe camp".
