= Utah Southern Railroad (1871–1881) =

Railroad in Utah, United States

The Utah Southern Railroad was built by members of The Church of Jesus Christ of Latter-day Saints in 1871-2 to connect Salt Lake City to points south. The line was acquired by the Union Pacific Railroad (UP) in 1875. The Utah Southern Railroad name was initially kept as a separate division of the UP, but over time the line was moved around and divided among different UP subsidiaries. While most of the corridor is still used today it is no longer contiguous. The southern portion of the line, from Provo to Lynndyl, remains under UP ownership and is today known as the Sharp Subdivision. The portion through the Salt Lake Valley is today owned by the Utah Transit Authority (UTA) and used for the TRAX light rail system, primarily the Blue Line. The portion between the end of the Blue line and Provo has had the rails removed, however UTA has retained the right to extend the TRAX system to Provo along the former Utah Southern right of way.

== History ==
The first portion of the line was constructed between Salt Lake City and York (south of Santaquin), and acquired by the Union Pacific Railroad (UP) in 1875. Under UP ownership, extensions to the line reached as far south and west as Frisco. In 1881 the railroad was merged into the Utah Central Railway, another UP subsidiary. In 1889 that subsidiary was merged into the Oregon Short Line and Utah Northern Railway, another UP subsidiary.

The line was transferred and divided during construction of the Los Angeles and Salt Lake Railroad, then partially owned and later fully owned by the Union Pacific. The portion of the former Utah Southern from Lynndyl to Milford was used for the LA&SL main, and remains in use as the primary Southern California - Utah rail trunk today, today known as the Lynndyl Subdivision. The remainder of the former Utah Southern became spurs from the LA&SL main. The spurs to Eureka, Fillmore, and Frisco were eventually abandoned. The LA&SL and Utah Southern used different routes between Lynndyl and Salt Lake, resulting in duplicate tracks between those two cities. The Utah Southern built tracks were routed to Salt Lake via Leamington Canyon of the Sevier River, passing through Nephi, Santaquin and Provo; the newer LA&SL built tracks were routed farther west in the desert, via Tooele and around the north end of the Oquirrh Mountains. Over time the tracks via Tooele became the preferred route for through traffic and the tracks via Provo became the secondary or local route. The route via Provo is no longer contiguous. The portion between Provo and Lynndyl is still part of the Union Pacific, and is known as the Sharp Subdivision; the portion through the Salt Lake Valley is no longer contiguous with the rest of the line, nor part of the Union Pacific network.

Between Salt Lake City and Provo the former Utah Southern line ran roughly parallel to the Denver and Rio Grande Western's Utah Division. Between these cities, the former Utah Southern route became mostly unused for through traffic after a 1985 track sharing agreement between the two companies. The right of way was sold to UTA in 1993, with the stipulation that UTA continues to allow a freight operator to service the existing freight customers on the line. The sales agreement included an option for the UTA to purchase the abandoned right of way over Point of the Mountain and into Utah Valley at a future date. The UTA used the corridor for a significant part of the TRAX light rail system, forming almost the entirety of the corridor of the Blue Line. Freight traffic on this portion is now managed by the Salt Lake City Southern Railroad.

== See also ==
- Utah Southern Railroad Depot - Surviving depot in Lehi, Utah
- Utah Railway - Parent company of the modern operator of the track
