= Lynndyl, Utah =

Town in the state of Utah, United States

- Town
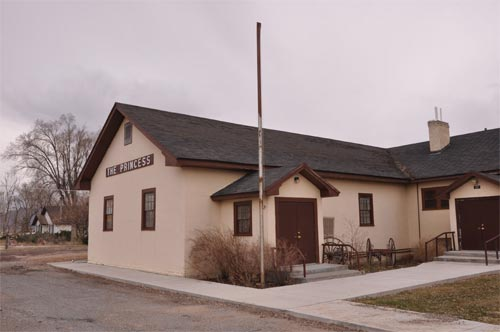
- The Princess Recreation Hall/Lynndyl LDS Meetinghouse in Lynndyl

- Location in Millard County and the state of Utah.
- Coordinates: 39°30′31″N 112°23′35″W
- Country: United States
- State: Utah
- County: Millard
- Founded: 1907
- Incorporated: 1945
- Named for: Lynn, Massachusetts

Area
  - Total: 3.12 sq mi (8.08 km^{2})
  - Land: 3.12 sq mi (8.08 km^{2})
  - Water: 0 sq mi (0.00 km^{2})
- Elevation: 4,780 ft (1,460 m)

Population (2020)
  - Total: 111
  - Density: 37.5/sq mi (14.48/km^{2})
- Time zone: UTC-7 (Mountain (MST))
  - Summer (DST): UTC-6 (MDT)
- ZIP code: 84640
- Area code: 435
- FIPS code: 49-46740
- GNIS feature ID: 2412929
- Website: lynndyl.utah.gov

Lynndyl is a town in Millard County, Utah, United States. The population was 111 at the 2020 census.

== Geography ==
According to the United States Census Bureau, the town has a total area of 3.5 square miles (9.1 km^{2}), all land.

== History ==
Lynndyl began as a railroad town in 1907. Farming in the area did not begin until 1912. Major rail lines have passed through Lynndyl since its founding. For many years it was the location of a fork in the Los Angeles and Salt Lake Railroad where one branch proceeded to Provo via Nephi and Santaquin and the other to Salt Lake City via Tooele. Today Lynndyl lends its name to the junction of the Lynndyl Subdivision and Sharp Subdivision.

== Demographics ==
Historical population
| Census | Pop. | Note | %± |
|---|---|---|---|
| 1910 | 113 | | — |
| 1920 | 488 | | 331.9% |
| 1930 | 495 | | 1.4% |
| 1940 | 366 | | −26.1% |
| 1950 | 241 | | −34.2% |
| 1960 | 145 | | −39.8% |
| 1970 | 111 | | −23.4% |
| 1980 | 90 | | −18.9% |
| 1990 | 120 | | 33.3% |
| 2000 | 134 | | 11.7% |
| 2010 | 106 | | −20.9% |
| 2020 | 111 | | 4.7% |
U.S. Decennial Census

As of the census of 2000, there were 134 people, 45 households, and 39 families residing in the town. The population density was 38.2 people per square mile (14.7/km^{2}). There were 55 housing units at an average density of 15.7 per square mile (6.1/km^{2}). The racial makeup of the town was 89.55% White, 2.24% Native American, 5.97% from other races, and 2.24% from two or more races. Hispanic or Latino of any race were 13.43% of the population.

There were 45 households, out of which 42.2% had children under the age of 18 living with them, 71.1% were married couples living together, 6.7% had a female householder with no husband present, and 13.3% were non-families. 13.3% of all households were made up of individuals, and 4.4% had someone living alone who was 65 years of age or older. The average household size was 2.98 and the average family size was 3.26.

In the town, the population was spread out, with 32.8% under the age of 18, 4.5% from 18 to 24, 23.9% from 25 to 44, 22.4% from 45 to 64, and 16.4% who were 65 years of age or older. The median age was 35 years. For every 100 females, there were 100.0 males. For every 100 females age 18 and over, there were 91.5 males.

The median income for a household in the town was $35,625, and the median income for a family was $40,278. Males had a median income of $31,250 versus $21,250 for females. The per capita income for the town was $11,738. There were 11.1% of families and 7.5% of the population living below the poverty line, including 13.0% of under eighteens and none of those over 64.

== See also ==
- List of cities and towns in Utah
