= Silver Zone, Nevada =

Nevada ghost town

Coordinates: 40°55′13″N 114°21′12″W

Silver Zone is a ghost town in Elko County, in the U.S. state of Nevada. The GNIS classifies it as a populated place. The town was located at the mountain pass where the Feather River Route (today known as the Shafter Subdivision) and Interstate 80 cross the Toano Range.

== History ==
Silver Zone had its start in 1872 as a mining community. A variant name was "Silverzone". A post office operated at Silver Zone from 1872 until 1873. By 1941, Silver Zone had ten inhabitants.
