= Alazon, Nevada =

- Ghost Town
- Location within the state of Nevada
- Coordinates: 41°08′01″N 115°01′48″W
- Country: United States
- State: Nevada
- County: Elko
- Elevation: 5,607 ft (1,709 m)
- Time zone: UTC-8 (Pacific (PST))
  - Summer (DST): UTC-7 (PDT)
- GNIS feature ID: 856181

Alazon is an extinct town in Elko County, in the U.S. state of Nevada.

== History ==
Alazon was a non-agency station at the east end of the combined Southern Pacific Railroad and Western Pacific Railroad tracks. In the early 1900s, Alazon consisted of a school, a section house and a homes for railroad employees. In 1940, Alazon had about ten inhabitants.

In 1948, Richard Stewart, a railroad worker based at Alazon, was murdered by his friend and co-worker Richard Lindley Boudreau (aka Richard Bays). Boudreau was sentenced to death, though his sentence was later commuted to life.

The station was discontinued in 1956. In 1957, Southern Pacific Railroad and Western Pacific Railroad completed a switchover at Alazon, where all westbound traffic traveled 181 miles on the Southern Pacific rails from Alazon to Weso (near Winnemucca) and all eastbound traffic traveled on the Western Pacific rails from Weso to Alazon. The switchover configuration had been in operation during World War I and tested again for three years in the 1950s. After the switchover, only section crews and their families resided at Alazon.
