= Los Angeles and Salt Lake Railroad =

Former train operator, now owned by Union Pacific

Original corporate logo of the San Pedro, Los Angeles & Salt Lake Railroad

SPLA&SL railroad workers, early 1900s in the Tintic Mining District, Utah

The Los Angeles and Salt Lake Railroad (reporting mark SLR) was a rail company in California, Nevada, and Utah in the United States, that completed and operated a railway line between its namesake cities (Salt Lake City, Utah, and Los Angeles, California), via Las Vegas, Nevada. Incorporated in Utah in 1901 as the San Pedro, Los Angeles and Salt Lake Railroad, the line was largely the brainchild of William Andrews Clark, a Montana mining baron and United States Senator. Clark enlisted the help of Utah's U.S. Senator Thomas Kearns, mining magnate and newspaper man, to ensure the success of the line through Utah. Construction of the railroad's main line was completed in 1905. Company shareholders adopted the LA&SL name in 1916. The railway was also known by its official nickname, "The Salt Lake Route", and was sometimes informally referred to as "The Clark Road". The tracks are still in use by the modern Union Pacific Railroad, as the San Pedro, Los Angeles, Cima, Caliente, Sharp, and Lynndyl Subdivisions.

== History ==
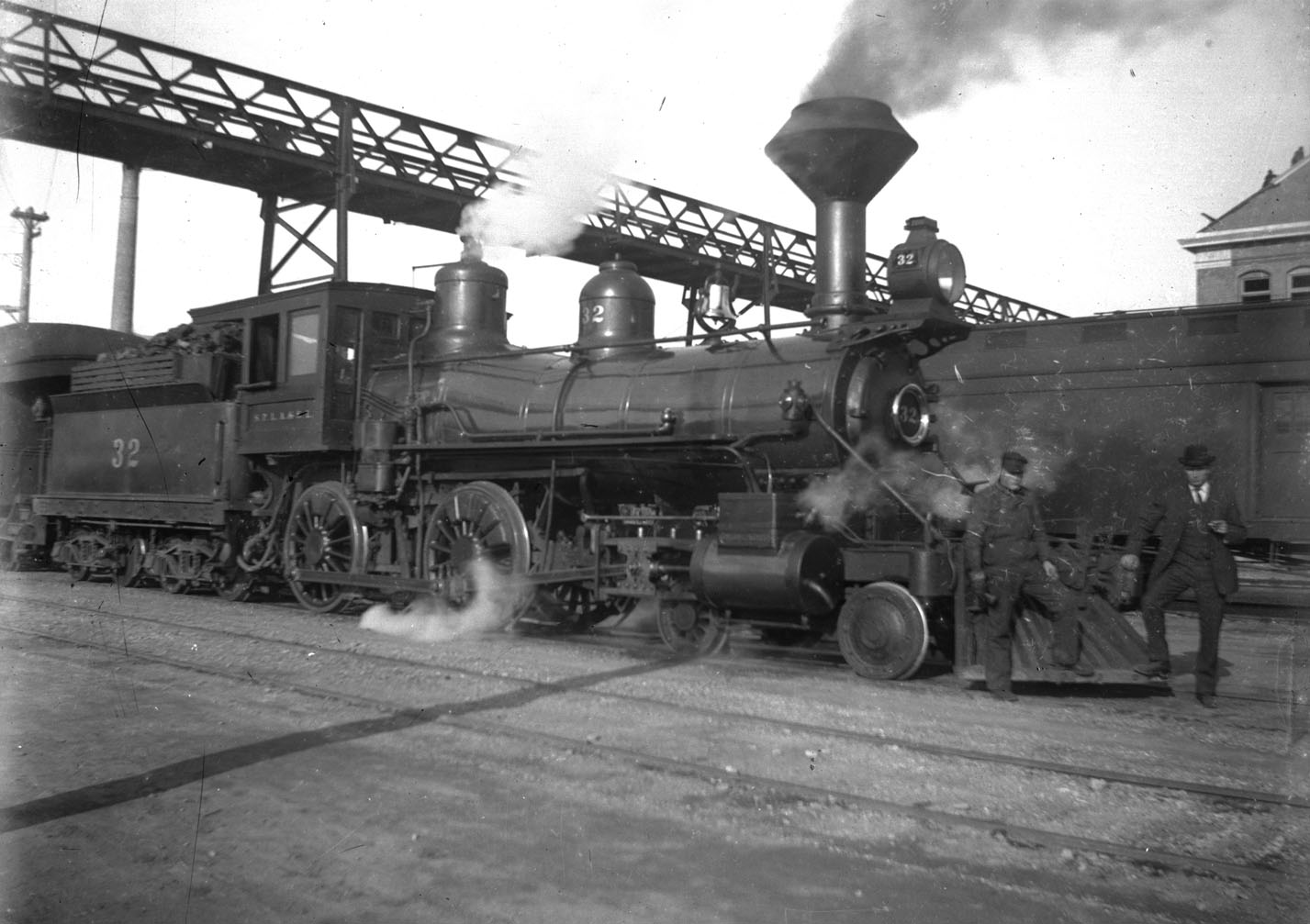
San Pedro, Los Angeles, and Salt Lake Railroad locomotive #32, early 1900s

The development of the railway line that became the LA&SL began in 1871 when the Utah Southern Railroad began laying track southward from Salt Lake City. The Utah Southern, controlled by the larger Union Pacific Railroad (UP), built a line to a station known as Juab, Utah, in 1879. From there a second UP subsidiary known as the Utah Southern Railroad Extension took up the work, completing trackage as far as Milford, Utah, in 1880. By the end of the century, these and other lines had been absorbed into the Oregon Short Line Railroad, a far larger UP subsidiary.

Work on extending the Milford line southward began by 1889, but no tracks were actually laid due to financial issues. Construction resumed in 1899 when the route was completed as far as the Utah–Nevada border. Grading work extended into Nevada, and the UP's stated intent was to continue the line all the way to southern California.

Another player entered the scene in 1900, when William Andrews Clark acquired the struggling Los Angeles Terminal Railway with an eye to extending the line northeast to Salt Lake. The railroad was reincorporated in 1901 as the San Pedro, Los Angeles & Salt Lake Railroad, and Clark announced plans to construct a line between Salt Lake and southern California. Clark assembled political and financial supporters to assist in the project, both in California and Utah. The competing Union Pacific Railroad and its formidable leader E. H. Harriman stood in opposition to Clark's plan.

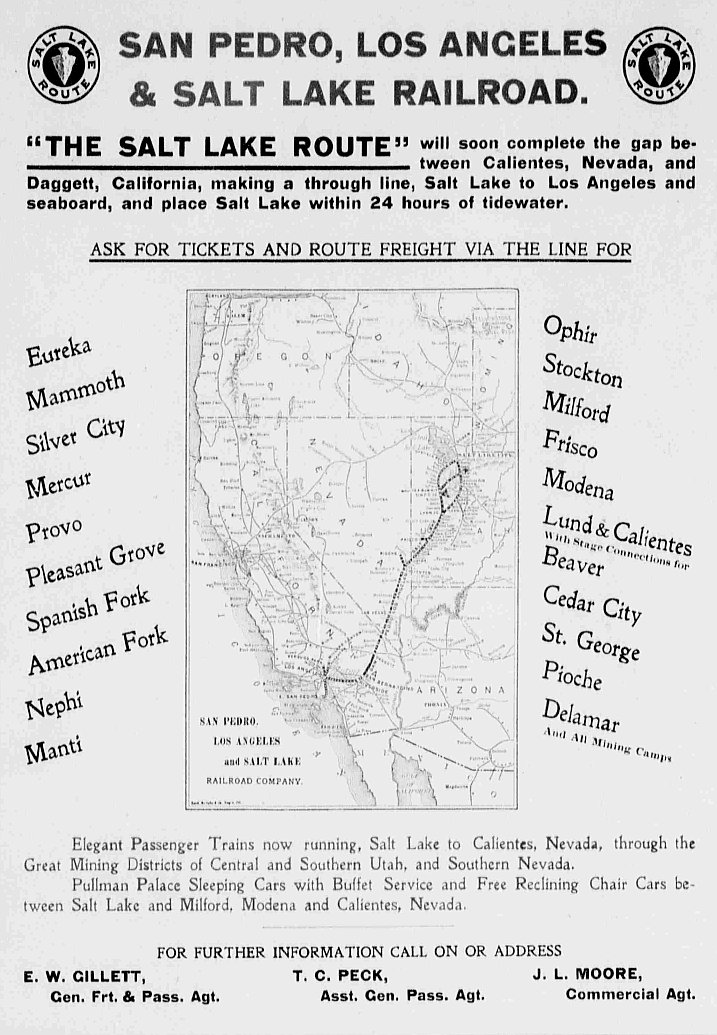
Newspaper ad with a map of the system, 1904.

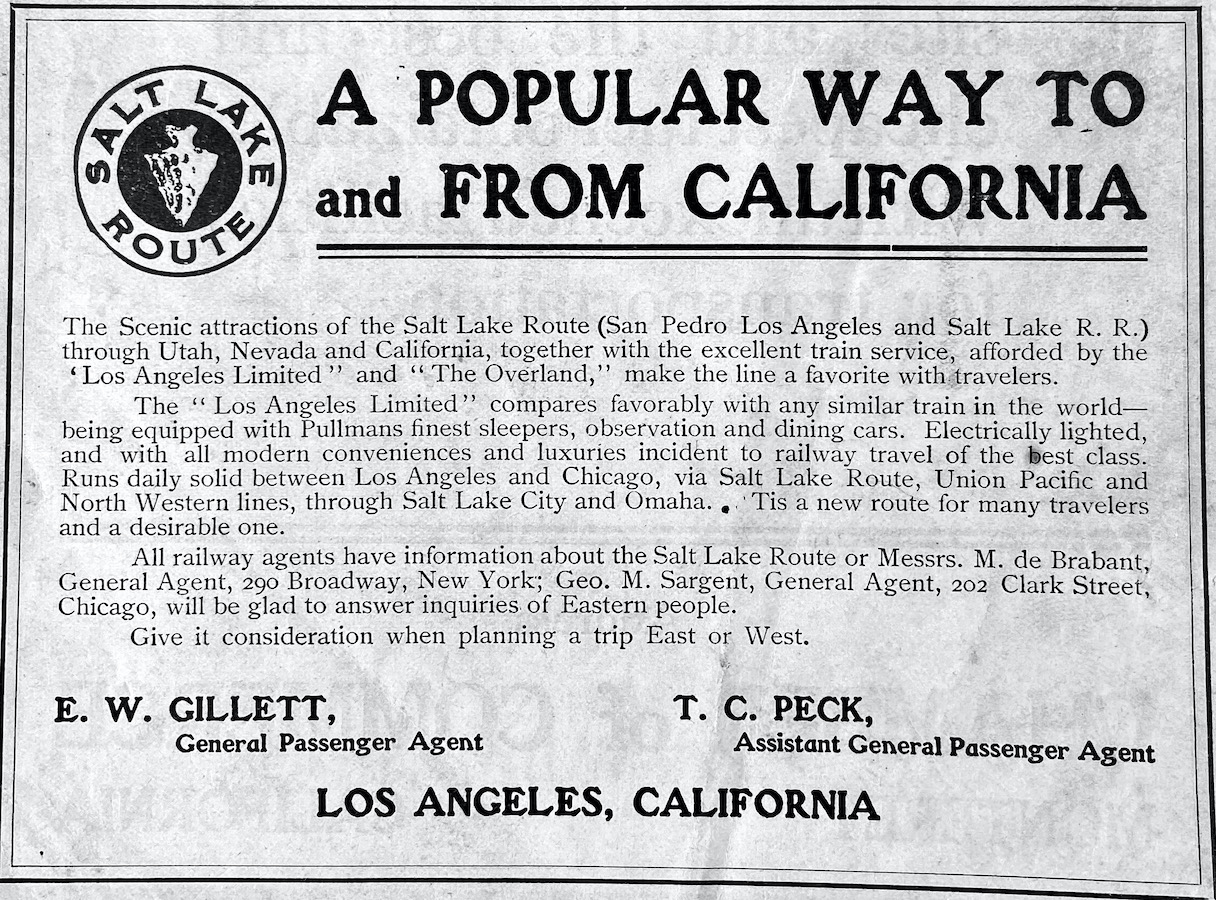
Advertisement from 1906

Clark's forces began construction work in Nevada, along the existing UP grade, and a brief "railroad war" ensued before Clark and the UP called a truce in 1903. Their agreement called for Clark's railroad to acquire the existing UP trackage south of Salt Lake City. In turn, the UP received a 50% interest in Clark's railroad. Construction of the remaining line proceeded rapidly to Daggett, California, where it connected to the Atchison, Topeka and Santa Fe Railway (ATSF), and the complete Salt Lake–Los Angeles line was opened on May 1, 1905. In California, Clark negotiated a trackage rights agreement from Daggett to Riverside, California, allowing his new line to use the existing ATSF route over Cajon Pass, in lieu of constructing its own tracks across the pass.

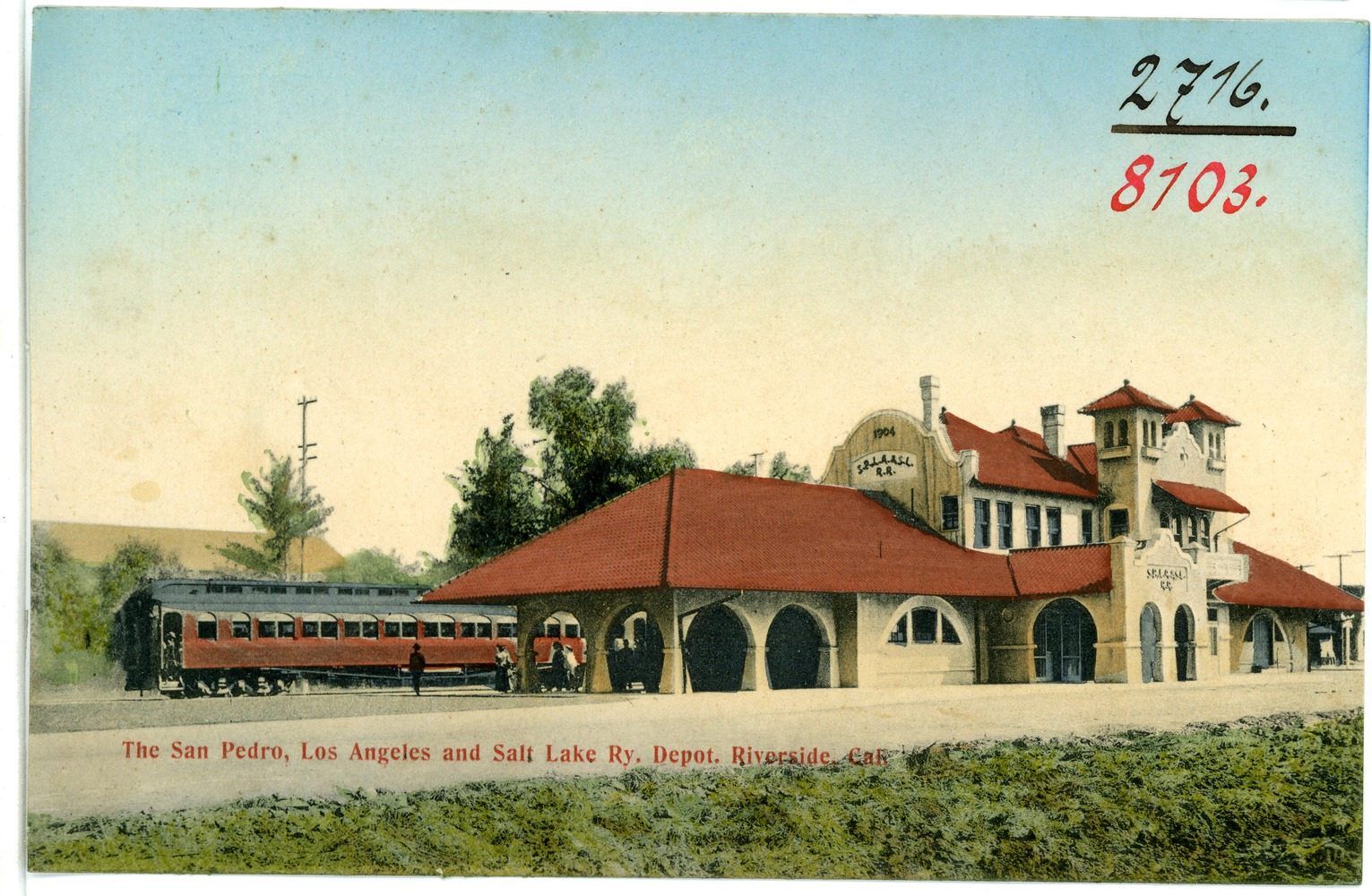
Riverside depot of the Los Angeles and Salt, photo postcard published by Brück & Sohn c. 1906

On April 16, 1916, the railroad’s stockholders voted to remove "San Pedro" from the corporation's name. The former town of San Pedro had been consolidated within Los Angeles in 1909. The LA&SL operated independently until April 27, 1921, when the UP agreed to acquire Clark's half-interest in the railroad. After 1921 the LA&SL lines were operated as part of the UP system, although the LA&SL corporation continued to exist on paper until January 1, 1988. The former LA&SL main line remains part of the UP network today as the Caliente and Lynndyl subdivisions.

In 1925, LA&SL reported 1,158 million ton-miles of revenue freight and 192 million passenger-miles. At the end of that year it operated 1,208 miles (1,944 km) of road and 1,970 miles (3,170 km) of track.

Originally, the LA&SL tracks through Utah were the approximate boundary between the Pacific Time Zone and the Mountain Time Zone. However, in April 1969, the time zone boundary was moved such that all of Utah was in the Mountain Time Zone.

== Route and stations ==
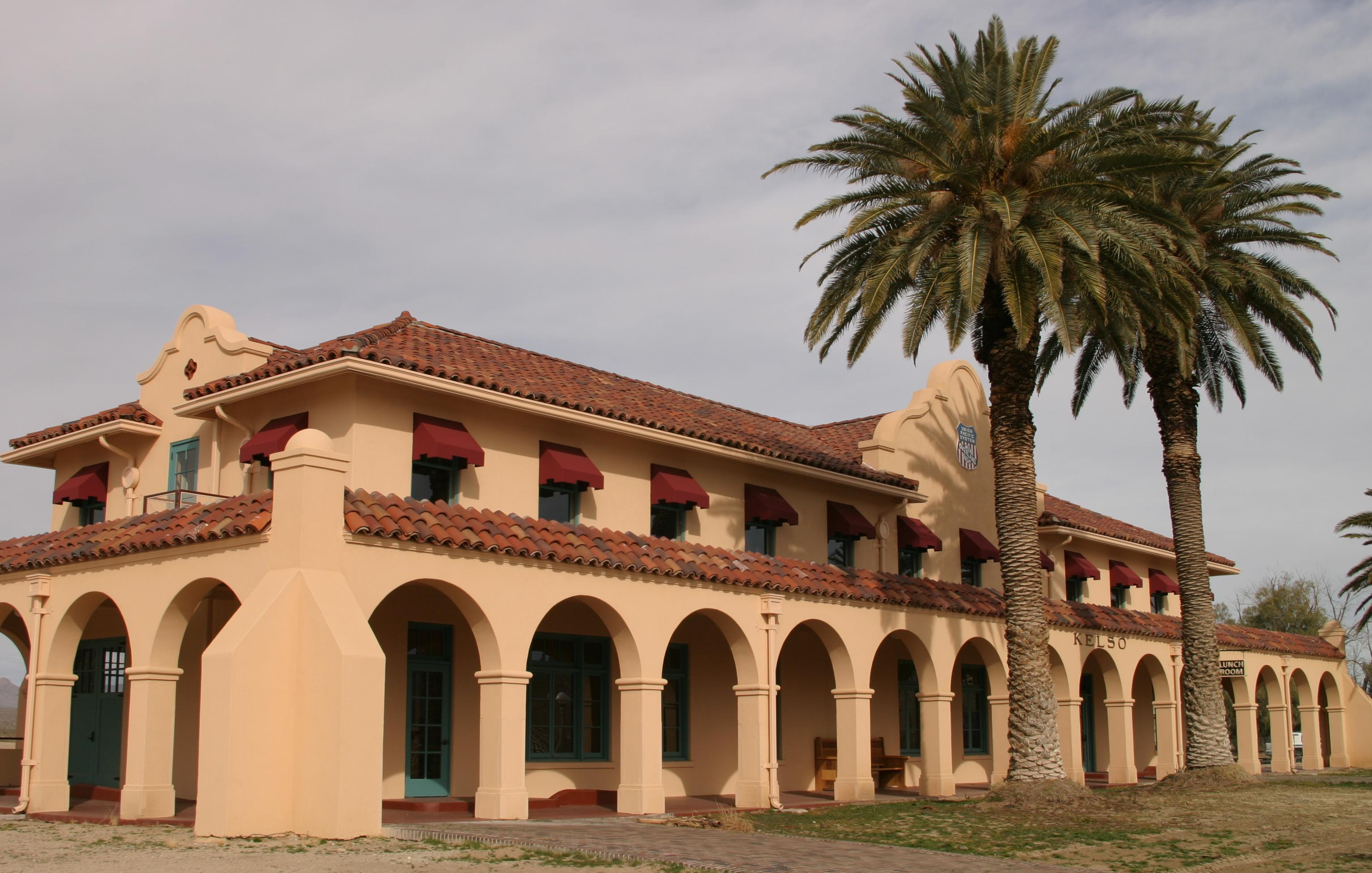
LA&SL depot in Kelso, California, December 2004

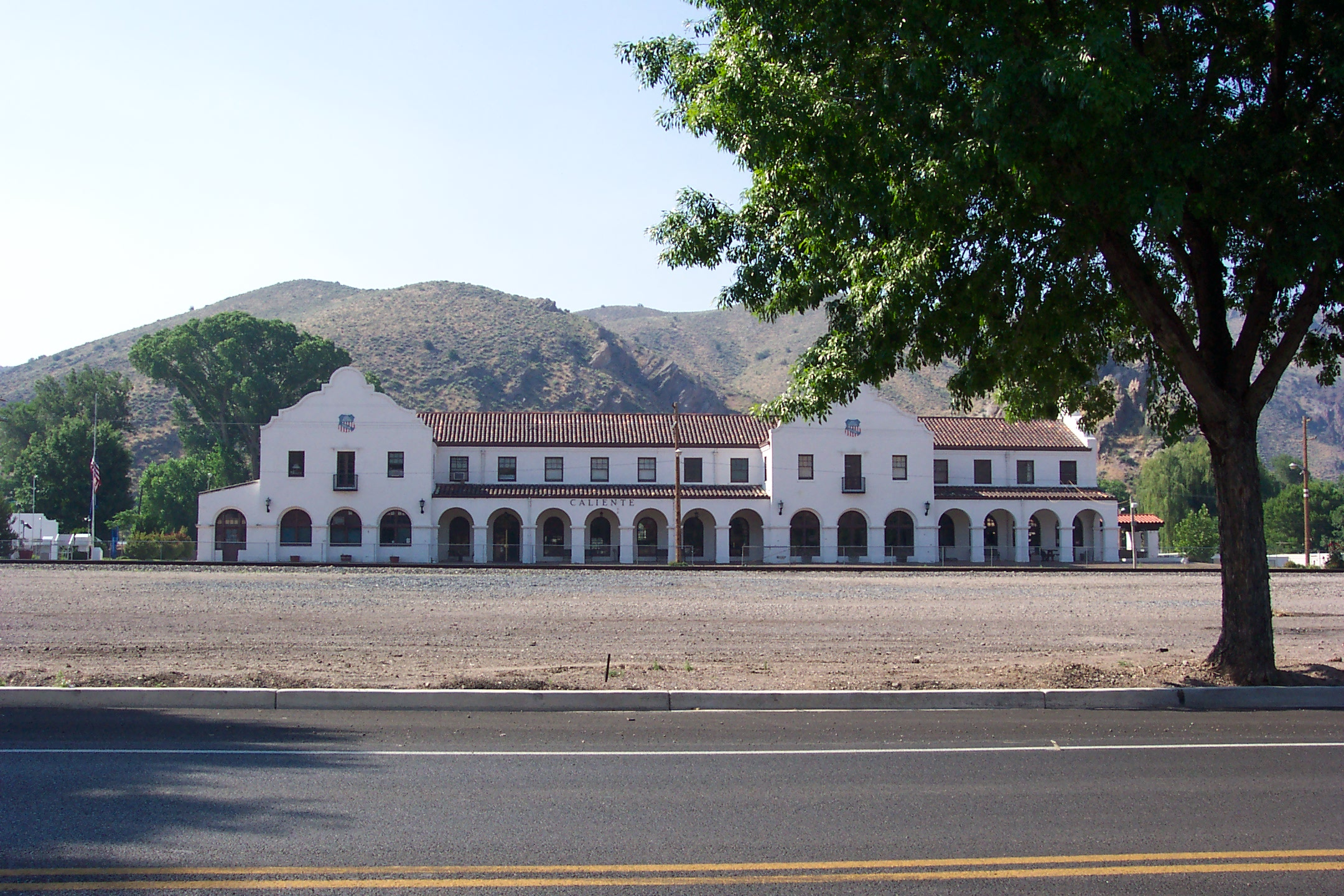
The Caliente Depot, in Caliente, Nevada, January 2007

Following standard railroad practice, the LA&SL designated a series of locations along its route as "division points"—bases for the railroad's operational and maintenance activities. Traveling southwestward from Salt Lake, the railroad's division point towns were Lynndyl and Milford in Utah; Caliente and Las Vegas in Nevada; and Yermo and San Bernardino in California. The railway also maintained a substantial presence in the remote town of Kelso, California. Nearly the entire route of the railroad traversed rugged and largely unpopulated desert terrain. There were no major population centers between the railroad's endpoints until the city of Las Vegas began its rapid growth in the mid-twentieth century.

The LA&SL was known for its depot buildings, many of which were imposing structures in the Mission Revival architectural style. The largest such depot, at Milford, was razed in 1981 and replaced with a smaller rail office, which remains in use today. The landmark LA&SL stations in Caliente and Kelso survive today. Several smaller Mission Revival depots erected by the railroad still exist in southern California. At least two of the railroad's smaller stations, at Lund and Black Rock in Utah, were designed by the noted architect Gilbert Stanley Underwood. The Salt Lake City depot was built in the French Renaissance style and is a landmark in that city.

An auxiliary locomotive repair shop erected in 1917 at 516 South Anderson Street in Boyle Heights, Los Angeles, stands as a rare surviving piece of the network's local infrastructure. The concrete and steel frame warehouse retains a faded, original painted arrowhead logo of the "Salt Lake Route" near the roof apex of its eastern elevation, confirming its historical use as a maintenance facility for the line.

== See also ==
- Railroad Cottage Historic District — Las Vegas
- Salt Lake Station — Los Angeles

== Additional reading ==
- Myrick, David F. (1992). Railroads of Nevada and Eastern California. Vol. II: The Southern Roads (Revised ed.). Reno, Nevada: University of Nevada Press. ISBN 0-87417-194-6.
- Strother, French (January 1906). "Swinging The March of Empire Southwestward". The World's Work: A History of Our Time. XI: 7072–7078.

Preceded by Gardner's Ranch	Nevada Historical Markers; 195	Succeeded by Carson City Mint
