= Oregon Short Line Railroad =

Former railroad in the mountain west in the United States

Overview
- Reporting mark: OSL
- Locale: Idaho, Montana, Oregon, Utah & Wyoming
- Dates of operation: April 14, 1881–1987

Technical
- Track gauge: 4 ft 8 1/2 in (1,435 mm) standard gauge
- Length: 321 miles (517 km)

1923 map of the railroad

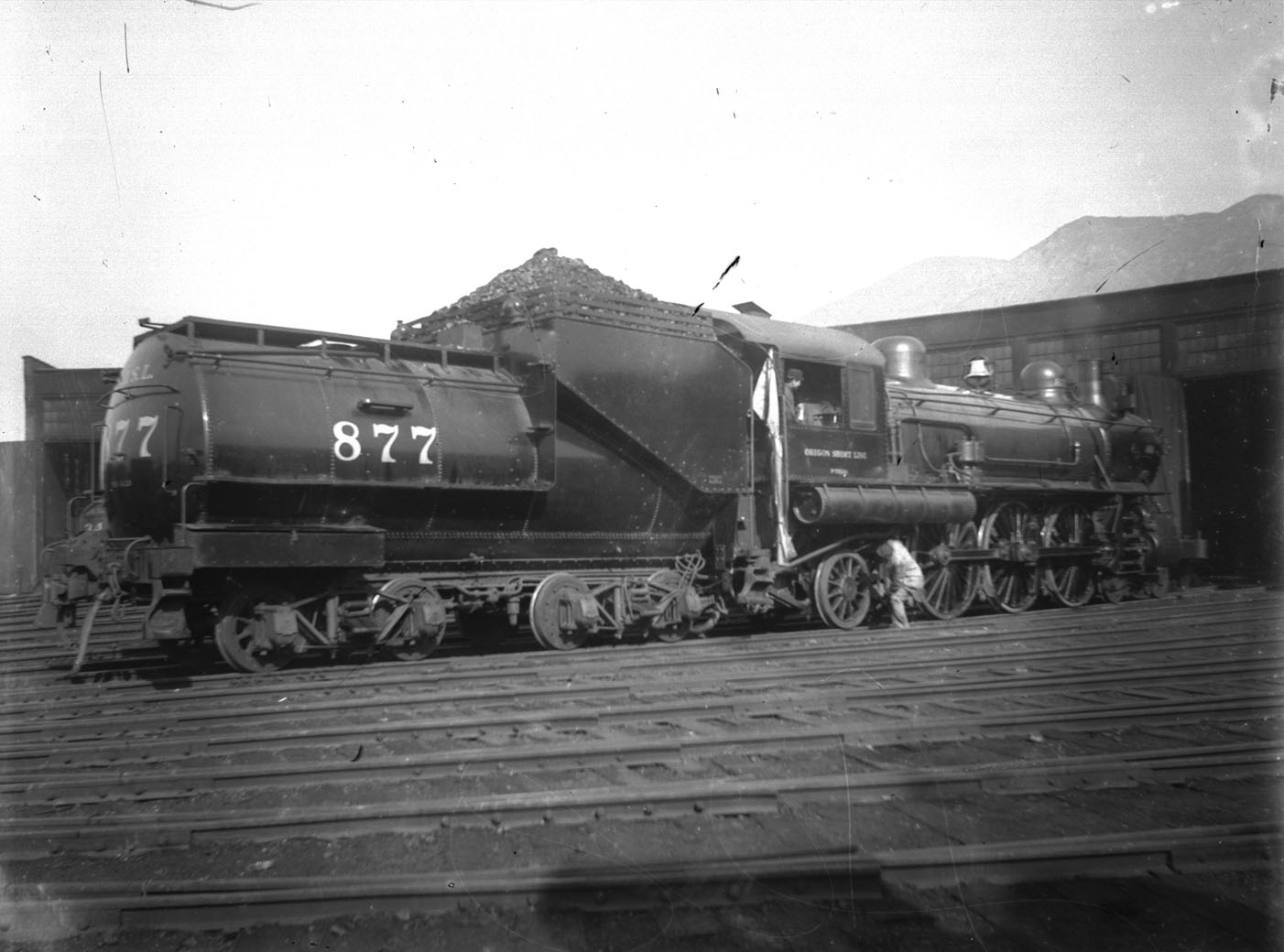
Oregon Short Line locomotive & tender No. 877, c. 1906

The Oregon Short Line Railroad (reporting mark OSL) was a railroad in Wyoming, Idaho, Utah, Montana and Oregon in the United States. The line was organized as the Oregon Short Line Railway in 1881 as a subsidiary of the Union Pacific Railway. The Union Pacific intended the line to be the shortest route ("the short line") from Wyoming to Oregon and the Pacific Northwest. Construction was begun in 1881 at Granger, Wyoming, and completed in 1884 at Huntington, Oregon. In 1889 the line merged with the Utah & Northern Railway and a handful of smaller railroads to become the Oregon Short Line and Utah Northern Railway. Following the bankruptcy of Union Pacific in 1897, the line was taken into receivership and reorganized as the Oregon Short Line Railroad ("OSL"). The OSL became a part of the Union Pacific System in the Harriman reorganization of 1898.

== Oregon Short Line Railway ==
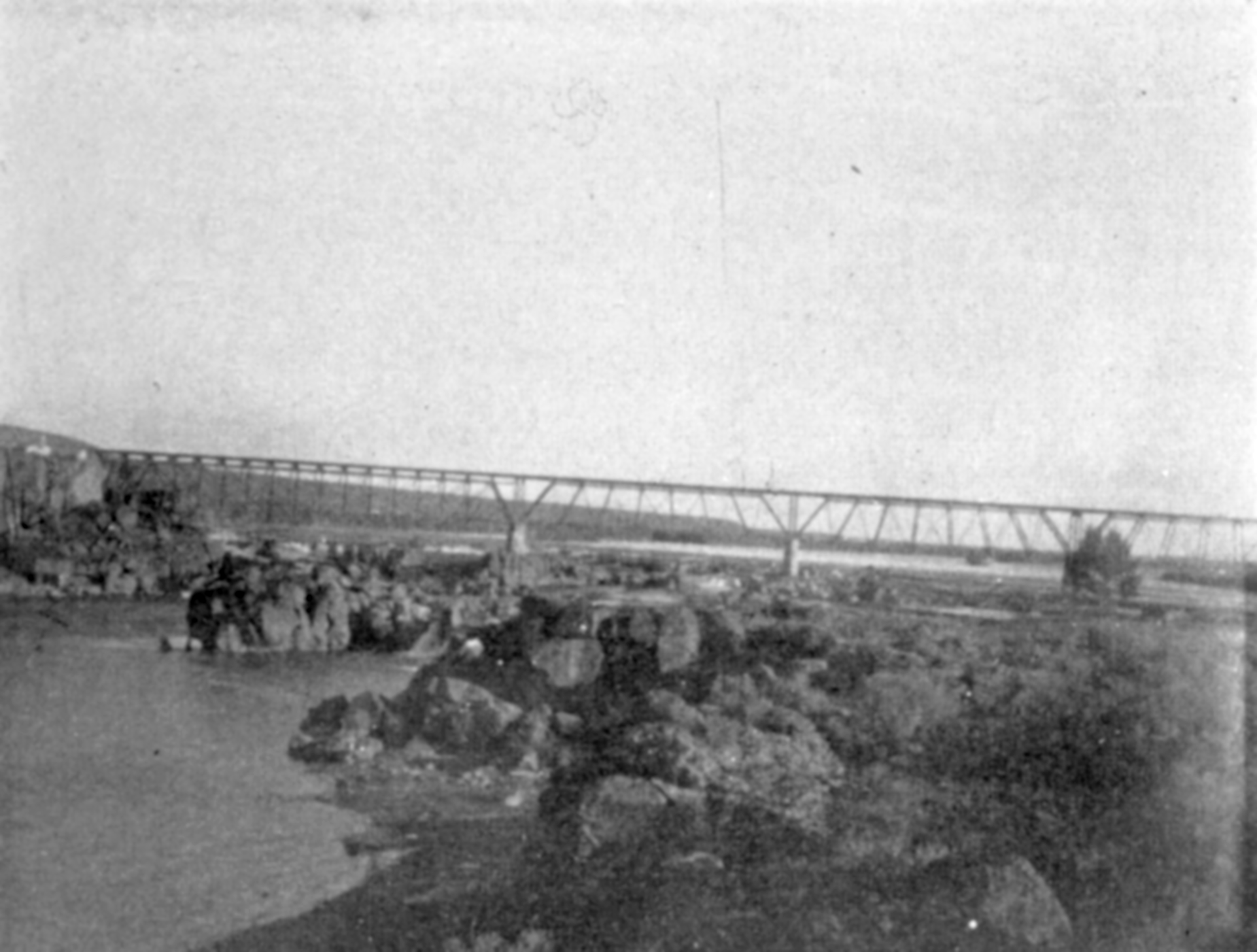
Oregon Short Line bridge over American Falls, from Oregon Historical Quarterly vol. 1.

The Oregon Short Line Railway was organized on April 14, 1881. The line started from the Union Pacific main line in Granger, Wyoming, and reached Montpelier, Idaho, on August 5, 1882, and then to McCammon, Idaho, in the Fall of 1882. Between McCammon and Pocatello, Idaho, the line was shared with fellow Union Pacific subsidiary Utah & Northern's grade by adding a third rail to the 3 ft (914 mm) narrow gauge track to accommodate the 4 ft 8 1/2 in (1,435 mm) standard gauge cars. The line from Pocatello to Huntington, Oregon, was completed in late 1884. Access to Portland, Oregon, was on track leased from the Oregon Railway and Navigation Company.

The line was essential because the Union Pacific main line ended in Utah where it met the Central Pacific Railroad, which by that time was part of the Southern Pacific Railroad. The Southern Pacific had built tracks as far east as El Paso, Texas, and would, in 1883, become a transcontinental railroad in its own right. The Southern Pacific then started routing traffic to the southern line, cutting off the Union Pacific, which needed other access to the Pacific coast. The Oregon Short Line also was meant to halt the OR&N's continued eastward expansion at the Idaho-Oregon border.

== Oregon Short Line and Utah Northern Railway ==
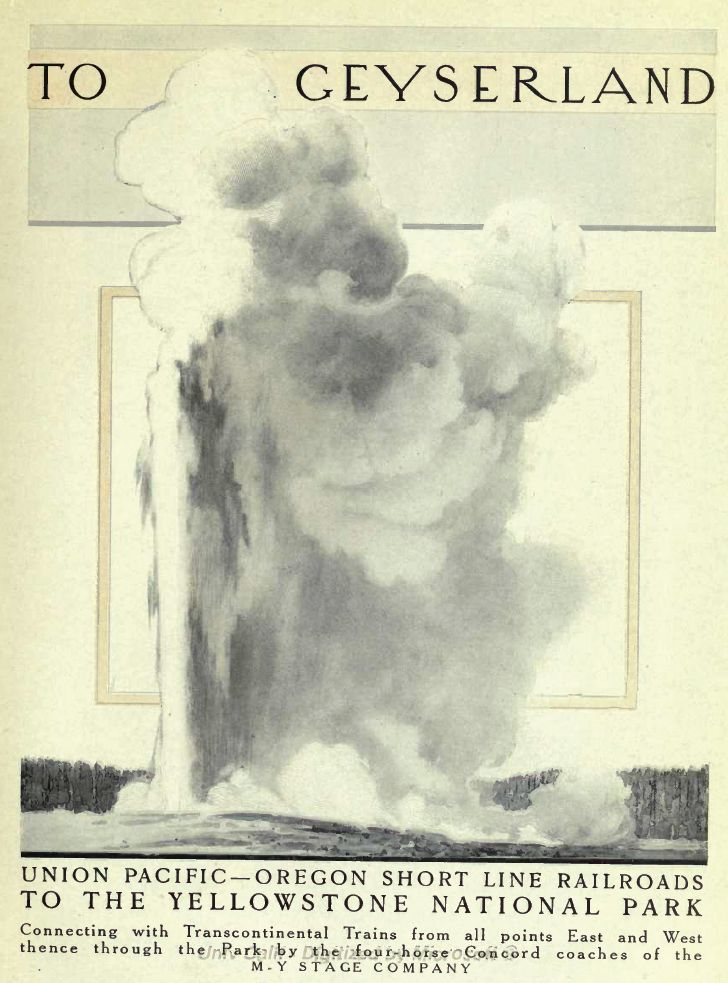
Cover of To Geyserland, an Oregon Short Line Railroad brochure.

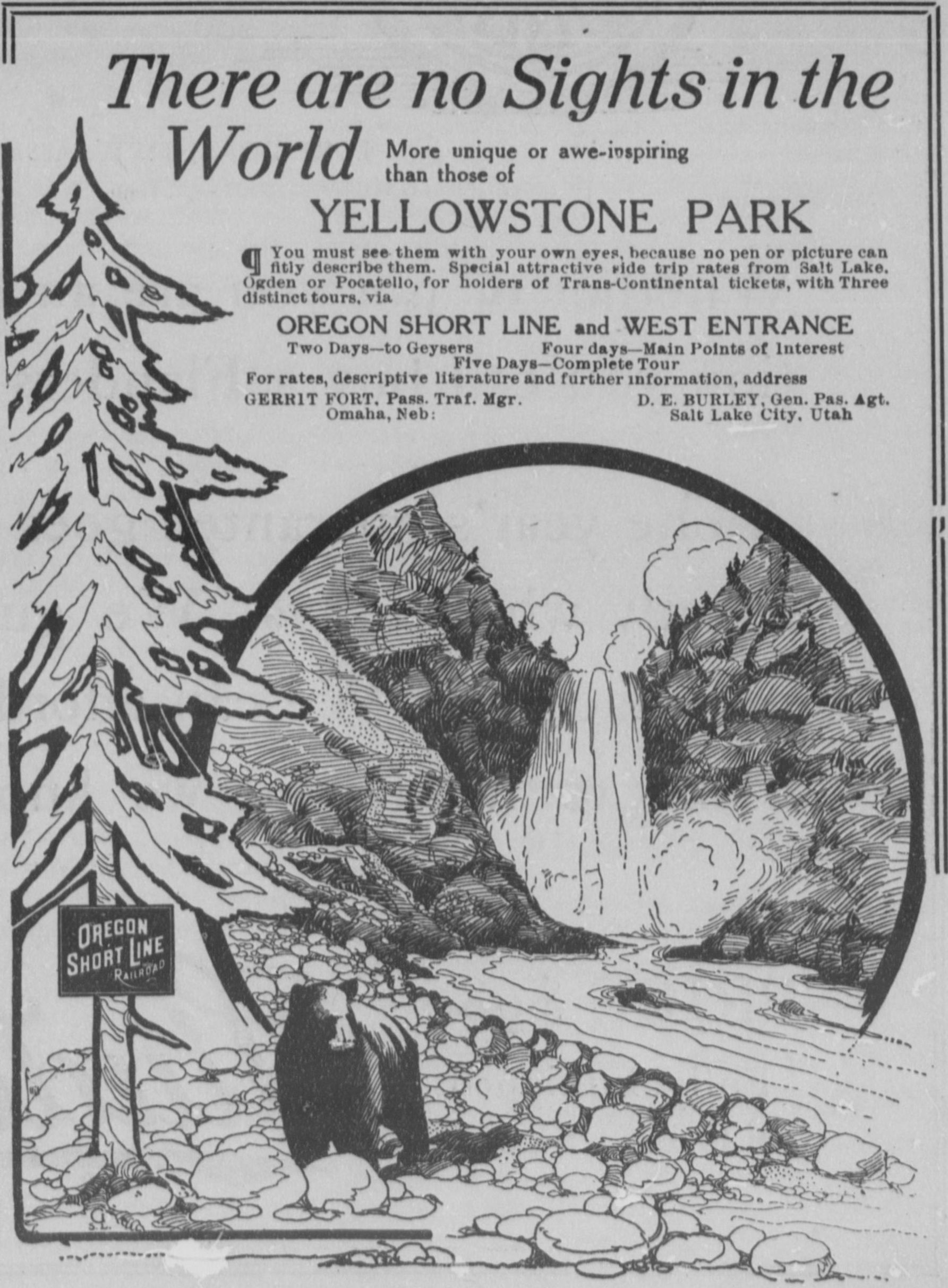
Oregon Short Line Yellowstone Park ad in Goodwin's Weekly of Salt Lake City, Utah, on September 23, 1911

On July 27, 1889, the Oregon Short Line Railway merged with Utah & Northern Railway and several other smaller railroads to form the Oregon Short Line and Utah Northern Railway. The corporate boards had voted for this in Boston. Those other companies in the merger included four in Utah (the Utah Central Railway, the Utah & Nevada Railway, the Salt Lake & Western Railway, and the Ogden & Syracuse Railway), one in Idaho (the Idaho Central Railway), and one in Nevada with a proposed line (the Nevada Pacific Railway).

In 1890 the company finished converting the original Utah & Northern line from 3 ft (914 mm) narrow gauge to 4 ft 8 1/2 in (1,435 mm) standard gauge, a process that U&N had started as early as 1885. On October 13, 1893, the OSL&UN went into receivership with the rest of the Union Pacific holdings. The Oregon Short Line Railroad was incorporated in February 1897 and purchased the property of the OSL&UN later that month. On March 15, the OSL took possession of the line and started operating.

The OSL was independent for a short period of time until October 1898 when the newly reformed Union Pacific Railroad took control of a majority of the board of directors. During the early part of the 20th century the railroad publicized tours of Yellowstone National Park by way of a spur constructed from Idaho Falls, Idaho, to West Yellowstone, Montana.

In 1938, Union Pacific began consolidating operations and leased for operation a number of its subsidiaries including the Oregon Short Line. The railroad operated under the lease until December 30, 1987, when the OSL was fully merged into the Union Pacific Railroad.

== See also ==
- Oregon Short Line Railroad Depot, in Ontario, Oregon – listed on the National Register of Historic Places
- Layton Oregon Short Line Railroad Station, in Layton, Utah – listed on the National Register of Historic Places
