= Horseshoe curve =

Roadbed that turns 180 degrees

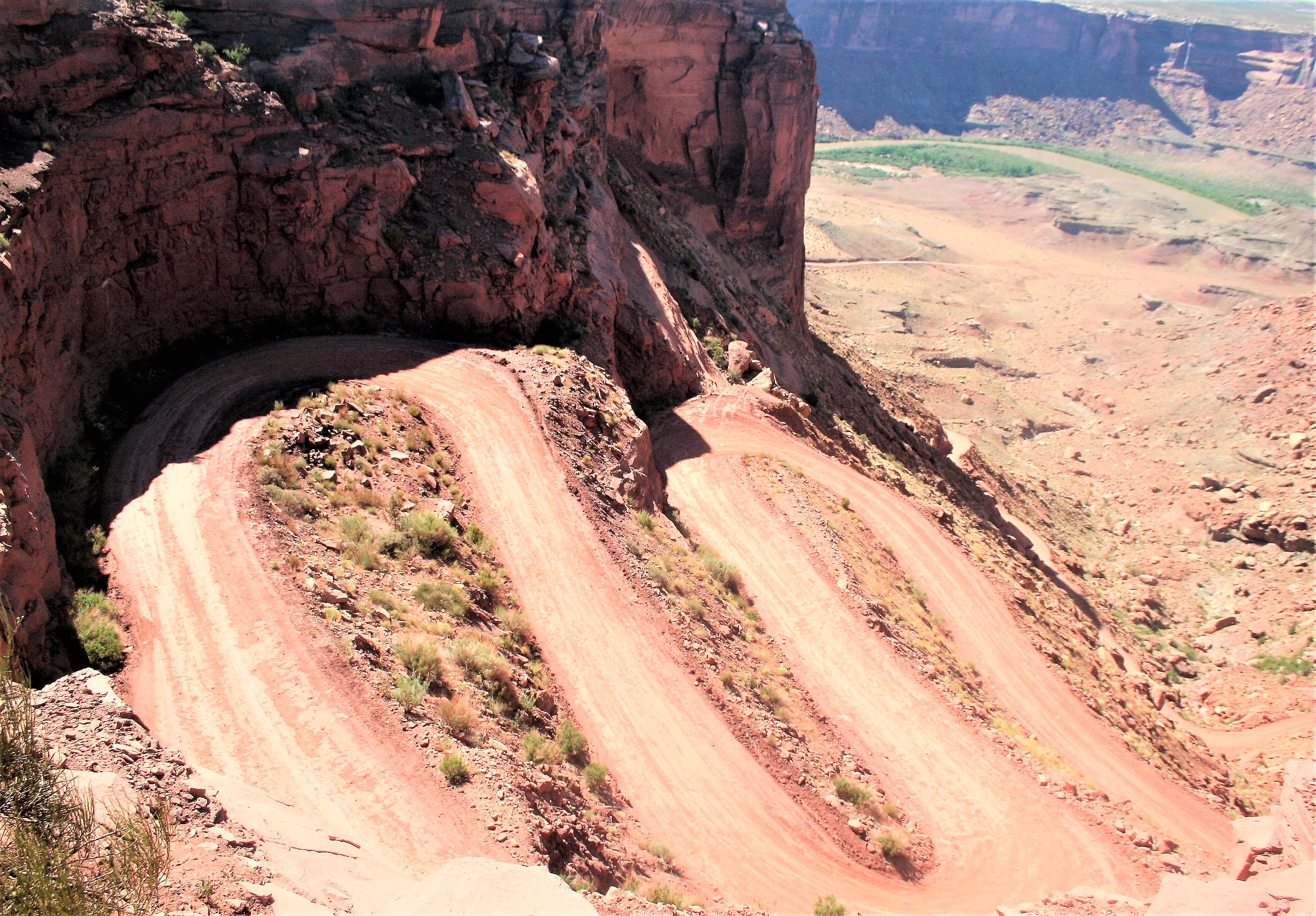
A road switchbacks into a canyon in Utah's Canyonlands National Park.

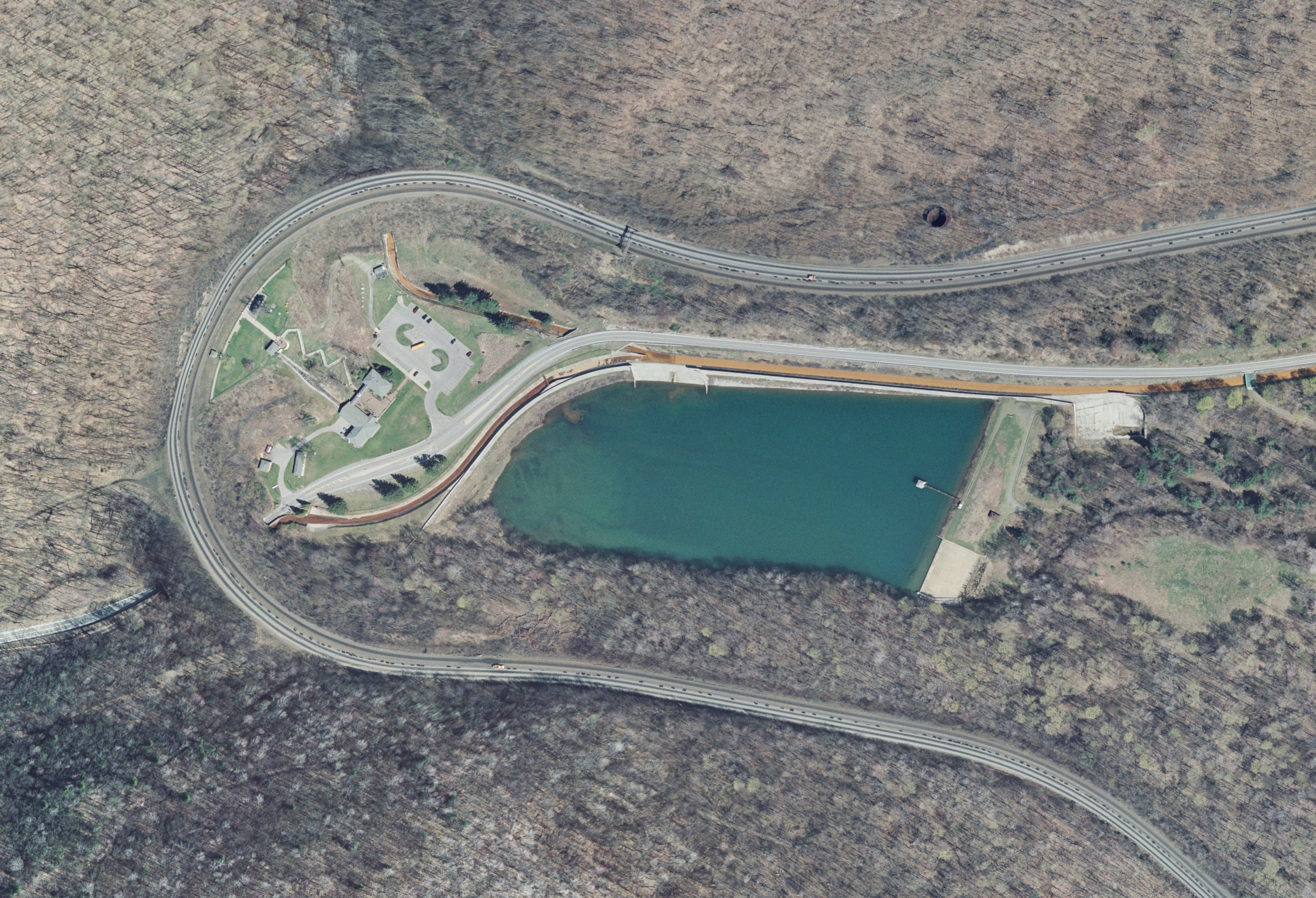
Aerial shot of the Horseshoe Curve that helps trains cross the Allegheny Mountains west of Altoona, Pennsylvania.

A horseshoe curve is a class of climbing curve in a roadbed that reverses turn direction (inflection) twice on either side of a single tight curve that varies through an angle of about 180 degrees or more.

Such curves are more commonly found in a railway line but are also used in roads. The characteristic U shape, or even slight balloon shape, of such a curve resembles a horseshoe. On roadways, particularly tight versions of such curves are typically called hairpin turns.

== Theory ==
A horseshoe curve is a means to lengthen an ascending or descending grade and thereby reduce the maximum gradient. Grade or gradient is defined as the rise divided by the run (length) or distance, so in principle such curves add to length for the same altitude gain, just as would a climbing spiral around one or more peaks, or a climbing traverse (cutting) wrapping around an end of a ridge.

If the straight route between two points is too steep to climb, a more circuitous route will increase the distance traveled, allowing the difference in altitude to be averaged over a longer track (or road) length. Unlike a spiral, a horseshoe curve does not involve the track crossing over itself, and the full horseshoe involves both relatively straight sections, curve deflections in both directions and tightly curved segment; while a spiral generally has a more uniform curvature. Obviously, a horseshoe also gives rise to a severe change in direction requiring another corrective curve to regain displacement in the overall direction of travel, while a spiral generally does not.

A horseshoe curve is sometimes used where the route bridges a deep gully. Deviating from a straight-line route along the edge of the gully may allow it to be crossed at a better location.

Horseshoe curves are common on railway lines in steeply graded or hilly country, where means must be found to achieve acceptable grades and minimize construction costs. As with spirals, the main limitation in laying out a horseshoe is keeping its radius as large as possible, as sharp curves limit train speed, and through increased friction, are harder on rails, requiring more frequent replacement of outer tracks.

== Examples ==
=== Europe ===
==== Bosnia and Herzegovina ====
- The ŽFBH railway connecting Sarajevo and Mostar has several horseshoe curves, some within tunnels and over viaducts, between stations at Grad and Konjic.

==== Germany ====
- The Rhein-Ruhr S-Bahn in Germany has a horseshoe curve in Neviges, Velbert on the route between Essen and Wuppertal, known as the Prince William railway.

==== Norway ====
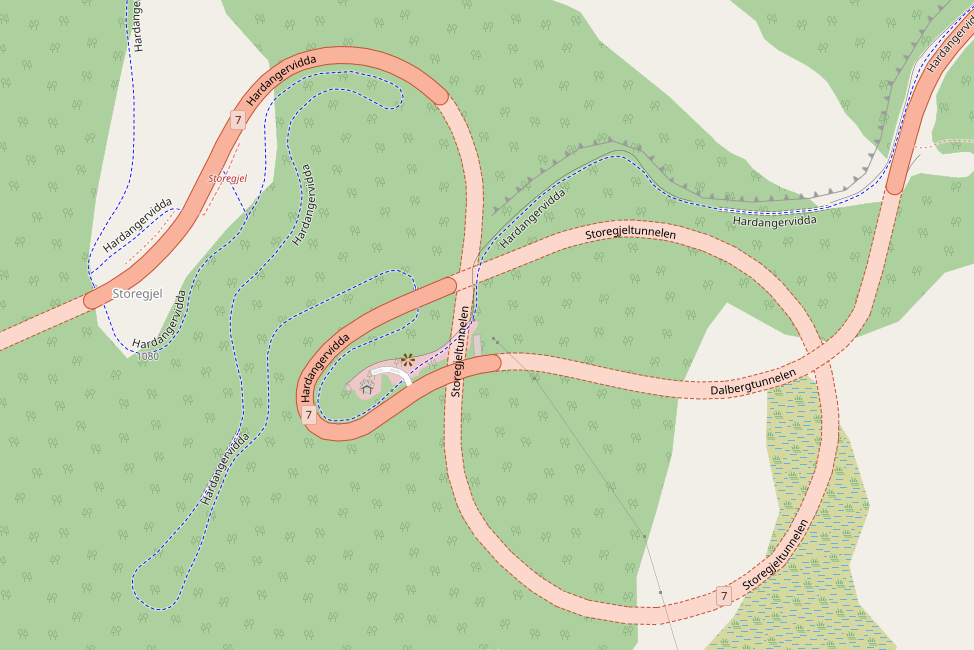
Map of Storegjeltunnelen and Dalbergtunnelen in Måbødalen gorge, a complex system of horseshoe curves, tunnels and loops on Norwegian National Road 7.

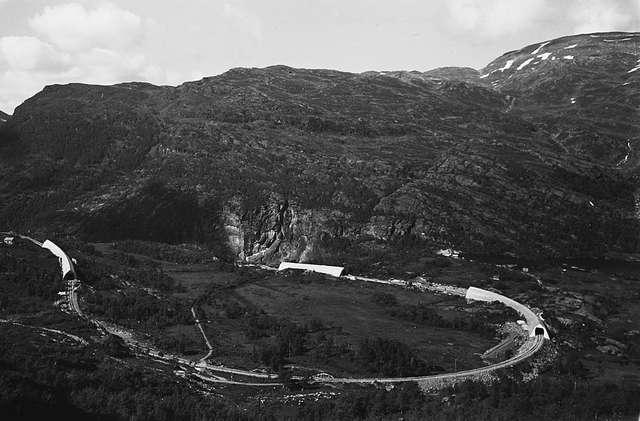
The Flåm Line, 1926 shortly after construction Credit: Anders Beer Wilse

- The Dovre Line, the main line of the Norwegian railway network, has a horseshoe within Grønbogen tunnel from Dombås at the steep hills to the Dovre plateau, standard gauge, single track.
- The Flåm Line, Norway, has a double horseshoe, one inside a tunnel, one in the open, few kilometres below top station, standard gauge, single track.
- The Rauma Line, Norway, has a double horseshoe through the steep and narrow valley at Verma, one inside a tunnel and one that includes the Kylling Bridge, standard gauge, single track.

==== Poland ====
- Grybów, Poland has a horseshoe curve 2,5 km west of the town.
- Kalisz, Poland has a double horseshoe curve leading the tracks from a flat plateau down to the valley of the Prosna river.
- Between Jelenia Góra and Szklarska Poręba in Poland there is a five-times, elongated horseshoe curve (50°51′19"N, 15°34′17"E). "N+15°33'23.6"E/@50.848201,15.5543693 Map

==== Slovakia ====
- In Slovakia there is a significant number of horseshoe curves on the Banská Bystrica to Turčianske Teplice railway track and on the railway from Zvolen to Turčianske Teplice. More than 20 tunnels and couple of horseshoe curves were built to overcome rough terrain and elevation differences.

==== United Kingdom ====
- Newcastle Quayside branch, a goods-only railway from the main line to the river quayside, through a steeply descending horseshoe tunnel.
- The horseshoe curve on the West Highland Line in Scotland between Upper Tyndrum and Bridge of Orchy was built because the engineers of the railway couldn't afford to build a viaduct crossing the remote valley.

=== North America ===
==== United States ====
Pennsylvania

- Coles Curve; Coles, Pennsylvania. Built by East Broad Top Railroad to 3 ft (914 mm) gauge
- Horseshoe Curve, the four-track route built by the Pennsylvania Railroad (PRR) that starts its climb along Kittanning Run due west of Altoona, and crosses two runs and three mountain faces using three gaps of the Allegheny
- Mance Curve, between Meyersdale and Hyndman, Pennsylvania, along Sand Patch Grade. Long operated by the Baltimore & Ohio Railroad, it is today part of CSX Transportation's Keystone Subdivision) used by freight trains and Amtrak's Capitol Limited (Chicago-Washington, D.C.) passenger train
- Muleshoe Curve, a former PRR line near Duncansville

Alaska

- In the Loop District of the Alaska Railroad between mileposts 48 and 51 northeast of Seward, Alaska, there was a horseshoe and a spiral, both on an extensive range of timber trestles up to 106 feet high. In 1951, a new route removed the original horseshoe, the spiral and all the trestles but added a new horseshoe at milepost 48.

California

- Stanford Curve; Truckee, California; Union Pacific Railroad (originally Central Pacific Railroad, and then Southern Pacific Railroad).
- Five curves on the California Western Railroad climbing the coast range east of Fort Bragg, California
- The Cantara Loops between Dunsmuir, California, and Mount Shasta, California. "N+122°16'53.7"W/@41.2603058,-122.2860363 Map
- Chorro, California on the grade from San Luis Obispo to Cuesta Pass, a route owned by the Union Pacific Railroad and used by Amtrak's Coast Starlight (Los Angeles to Seattle).

Colorado

- Big Ten Curve; at the foot of the Front Range west of Arvada on the eastern approach to the Moffat Tunnel; Union Pacific (originally D&SL).
- Fir Loop; near the summit of La Veta Pass; San Luis and Rio Grande Railroad (originally D&RG).

Horseshoe curves were used extensively on the many narrow gauge railroads in the Colorado Rocky Mountains, now mostly abandoned, for example:

- On the Cumbres and Toltec Scenic Railroad (formerly D&RGW); 3 ft (914 mm) gauge:
  - Coxo Curve; Cumbres, Colorado
  - Tanglefoot Curve; Cumbres, Colorado
  - Los Pinos Curve; Los Pinos, Colorado
  - Phantom Curve; Sublette, New Mexico
  - Whiplash Curve; Big Horn, Colorado
  - Lava Loop; Lava, Colorado
- Ophir Loop; Ophir, Colorado; Rio Grande Southern Railroad – 3 ft (914 mm) gauge (abandoned)
- Altura Curve; Altura, Colorado; Rio Grande, Pagosa and Northern; 3 ft (914 mm) gauge (abandoned)
- On the Uintah Railway; 3 ft (914 mm) gauge (abandoned):
  - 66° curve; Moro Castle, Colorado;
  - Balloon Loop; Columbine, Colorado
  - Hairpin Curve and Muleshoe Curve; McAndrews, Colorado

Idaho

- Horseshoe Tunnel, south of Culdesac, Idaho on the Camas Prairie Railroad.

Maryland

- Helmstetter's Curve; Corriganville, Maryland, between Cumberland and Frostburg, Maryland, at Cash Valley Road; former Western Maryland Railway Connellsville Extension, now the Western Maryland Scenic Railroad.

Montana

- Vendome Loop; 9 miles west of Whitehall on the eastern approach to Pipestone Pass; Milwaukee Road (abandoned 1980).

Nevada

- Arnold Loop; on the eastern approach to Silver Zone Pass in the Toano Range in eastern Nevada; Union Pacific (formerly Western Pacific).

New York

- Swain, New York; Pittsburg, Shawmut, & Northern Railroad (abandoned)
- Richburg, New York; Pittsburg, Shawmut, & Northern Railroad (abandoned)

Oregon

- East of Oakridge on the Cascade Line.

Utah

- Gilluly Loops, a double horseshoe west of Soldier Summit, Utah; Union Pacific (formerly D&RGW).

Washington

- Foss Creek, between Skykomish and the Cascade Tunnel.

==== Canada ====
British Columbia

- Notch Hill, on CP's Shuswap Sub near Salmon Arm, British Columbia.

=== Asia ===
==== China ====
Jiangsu

- In the urban area of Nanjing, China, a horseshoe connects the railway between the Zhonghuamen and Xuanwu Lake, which belongs to the Nanjing-Wuhu Railway.

Shaanxi

- Baoji-Chengdu Railway
  - Guanyin hill Curve, on Baoji-Chengdu Railway in China, a double horseshoe and a buttrtfly curve, south of Weibin District, at 34°16′00″N 107°00′35″E
  - Majia Dam Curve

Sichuan

- Chengdu–Kunming Railway
  - Naituo Curve, aishiyan Station.
  - Lewu Curve.
  - Handulu-lianghekou Curve.
  - Liudu River Curve.
  - Liugou Curve.

Xinjiang

- Neijiang–Kunming Railway
  - Yiliang Curve.
- Guiyang–Guangxi Railway
  - Layi Curve.

Yunnan

- Banmaoqing, on Nanning–Kunming Railway in China, a double horseshoe inside Yiliang County, located east of Yiliang Town, at 24°55′56″N 103°12′32″E
- Guizhou–Kunming Railway
  - Hemaling–Beikaizhu Curve(abandoned).
- Chengdu–Kunming Railway
  - Bagele Curve.
  - Fala Curve.

Gansu

- Lanzhou–Xinjiang Railway
  - Wushao Hill Curve (abandoned).

Qinghai

- Guanjiao Curve Group, Qinghai–Tibet Railway
  - Erlang Curve.
  - Erlang North Curve.
  - Nanshan Curve.
  - Luobei Curve.
  - Luobei South Curve.

==== Iran ====
- The Trans-Iranian Railway through the Alborz Mountains has extensive horseshoe curves, including four double horseshoes, and with a double spiral at 35°52′34″N 52°57′20″E.
- Also on the Trans-Iranian in the Zagros Mountains, a pair of tightly linked horseshoes forms a "figure of 8" in which one loop almost completely contains the small city of Sepiddasht, Lorestan. The other loop is almost entirely within a tunnel, with both its portals nearly side-by-side but several meters different in elevation. Both loops rotate about 250 degrees each.

==== Japan ====
- Kamaishi Line of East Japan Railway Company in Japan, has a horseshoe curve from Kamiarisu Station down to Rikuchū-Ōhashi Station ("down" on the elevation and registration of direction of the line).

==== Pakistan ====
- ML-1 of Pakistan Railways in Pakistan, has a horseshoe curve from Tarki Railway Station to Sohawa Railway Station.

=== Oceania ===
==== Australia ====
- The Cougal Spiral is a feature of the North Coast Railway in Australia that connects New South Wales with Queensland through Richmond Gap. The railway line climbs at a steady ruling gradient from Kyogle to the summit at a tunnel at the border between the two states.
- Picton railway station, New South Wales, turns back on itself at about 225 degrees.

==== New Zealand ====
- The Raurimu Spiral in New Zealand has a horseshoe curve as the first part of the climb.
- The U-bend south of Maddingly, Victoria takes a large detour to descend 100m.
- Turangarere, New Zealand North Island Main Trunk line near Hīhītahi.
