= Tucker, Utah =

Tucker
- Ghost town
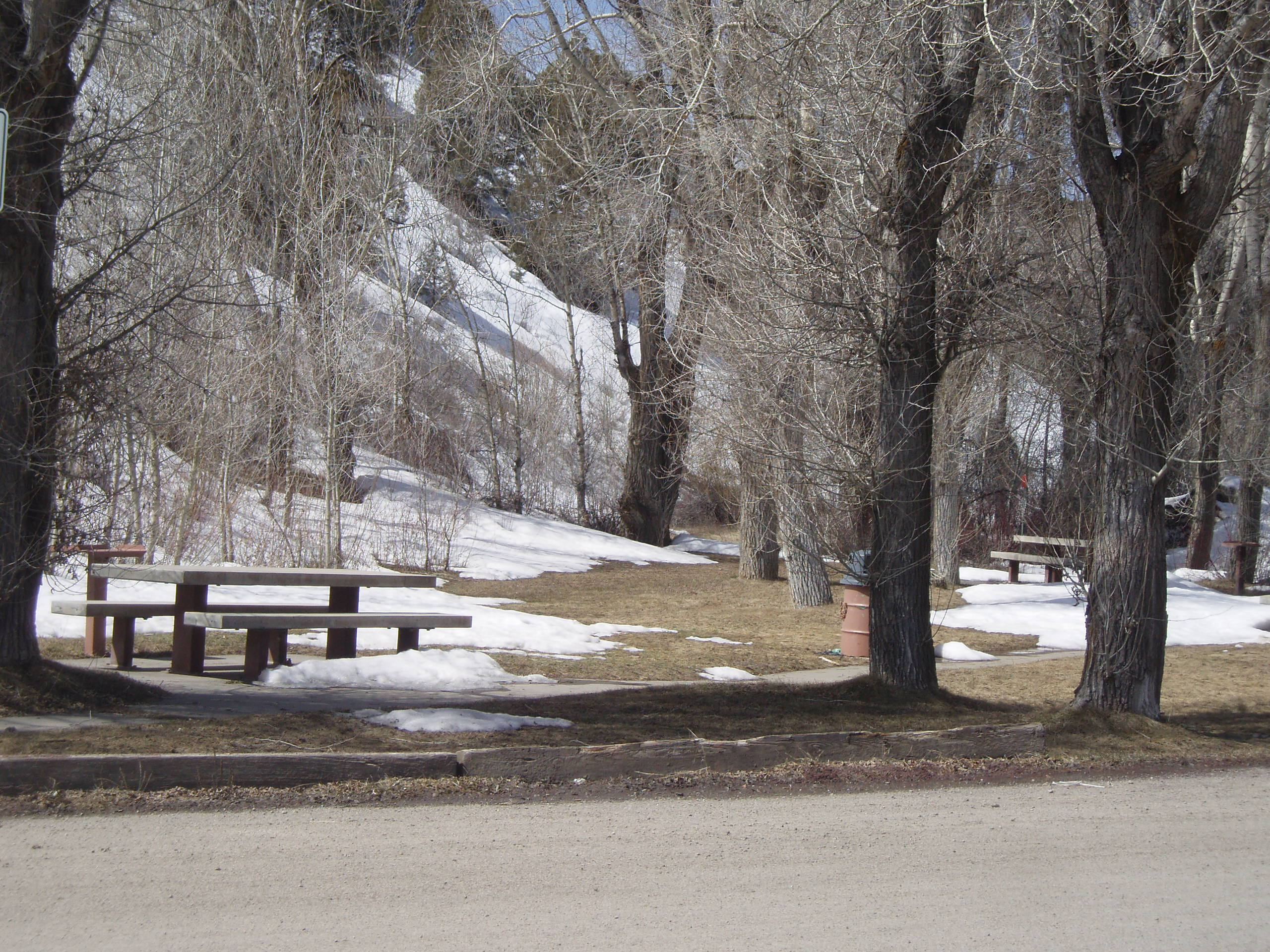
- 2008 view of the rest stop at the former site of Tucker

- Location within Utah Location within the United States
- Coordinates: 39°56′04″N 111°11′58″W
- Country: United States
- State: Utah
- County: Utah
- Abandoned: 1913
- Named for: James Tucker
- Elevation: 6,227 ft (1,898 m)
- Time zone: UTC-7 (Mountain (MST))
  - Summer (DST): UTC-6 (MDT)
- GNIS feature ID: 1446752

Tucker is a ghost town located near the east end of the Spanish Fork River in Utah County, Utah, United States 7 miles (11 km) below Soldier Summit on U.S. Route 6. It was once an important loading point and construction camp on the Denver and Rio Grande Western Railroad (D&RGW). After the town was abandoned, the state of Utah used the town site for a rest area. In 2009, the site was buried as part of a project to re-align a portion of US-6's western approach to Soldier Summit. To honor the town, the state of Utah built a replacement rest area about 2 miles (3.2 km) downstream from Tucker, called the Tie Fork Rest Area.

== History ==
Historical population
Census	Pop.	Note	%±
1900	211		—
1910	373		76.8%
1920	40		−89.3%

Tucker started as a simple railroad junction, between the main line of the D&RGW railroad and the spur of the Utah and Pleasant Valley Railway, which extended to mines at Winter Quarters (near today's Scofield Reservoir). When a station was built here to house the helper engines used to push freight trains over Soldier Summit, it quickly grew into a town with a population of 500, called Clear Creek. (The current community of Clear Creek, Utah, population 4, is located several miles south of the former site of Tucker.)

"Clear Creek", as it then was known, had a boarding house, company store, and saloon, and dozens of hastily constructed houses filled the small valley. From 1881 to 1919 it also had a post office. By 1900 its name was changed to Tucker, for a certain James Tucker.

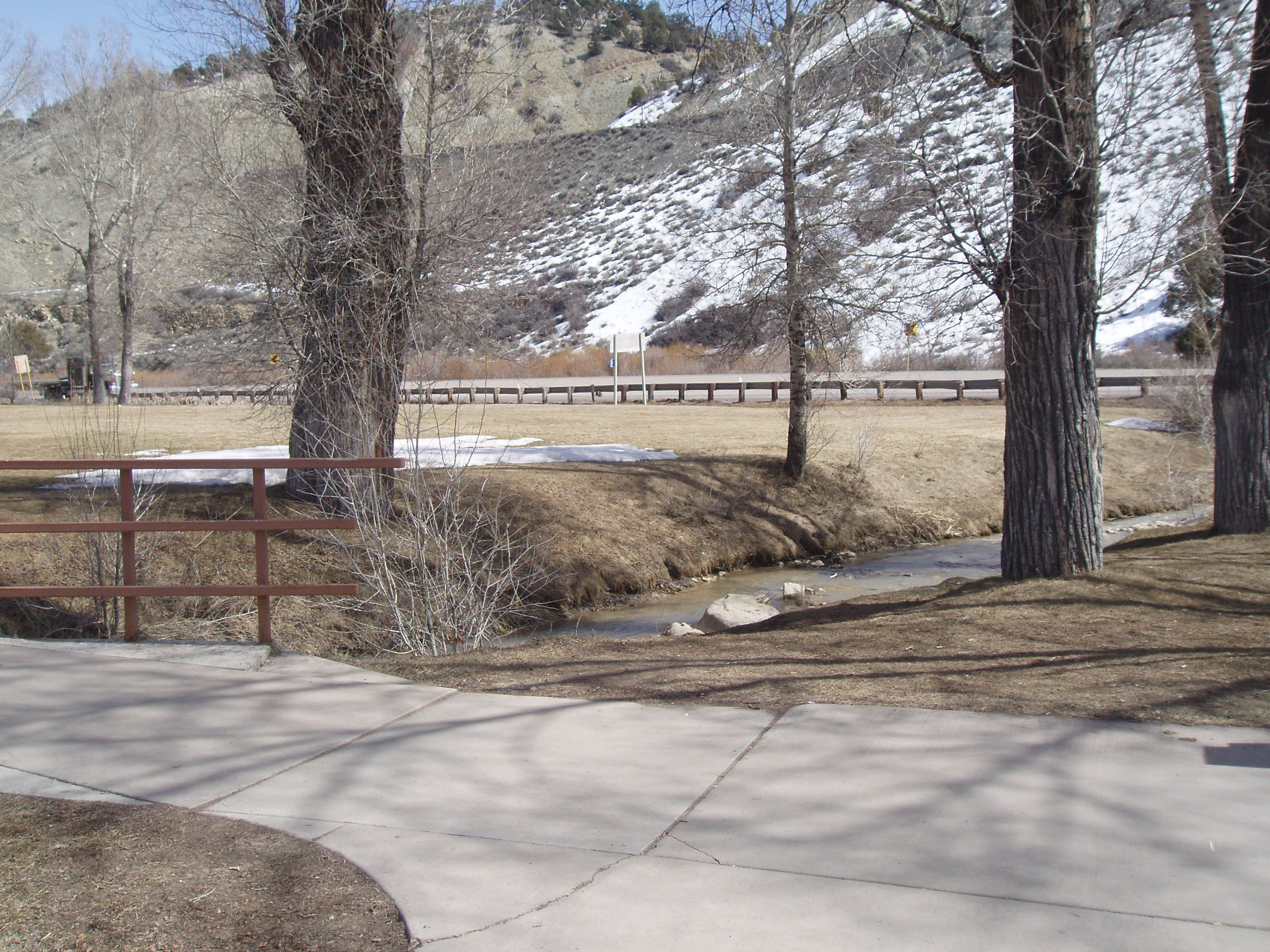
A trace of the old railroad grade is still visible in the background east of Tucker.

Tucker came to an end in 1913, when the railroad re-aligned the tracks to reduce the grade up to Soldier Summit from a dangerous 4% grade, to a more manageable 2.0%. With the new alignment, the branch to Scofield was completely re-routed to branch from the main near Colton. The new alignment bypassed and abandoned the town of Tucker and an area called Gilluly, although the new alignment was often called the Gilluly loops or Gilluly horseshoe curves, due to the circuitous route it took up the hill. The railroad filled in much of the location to lift the road bed far above the valley floor. All the buildings are gone, and even most of the old railroad grade is covered by the fill. When U.S. Route 50, the predecessor of the modern U.S. Route 6, was paved in the 1920s, the old railroad alignment was used for the highway. In 1969, the state used the site of the town to build a rest area near modern mile post 204. Aside from a plaque at the facility, there was no sign that the roadside rest stop sat on top of a ghost town.

== Tie Fork Rest Area ==
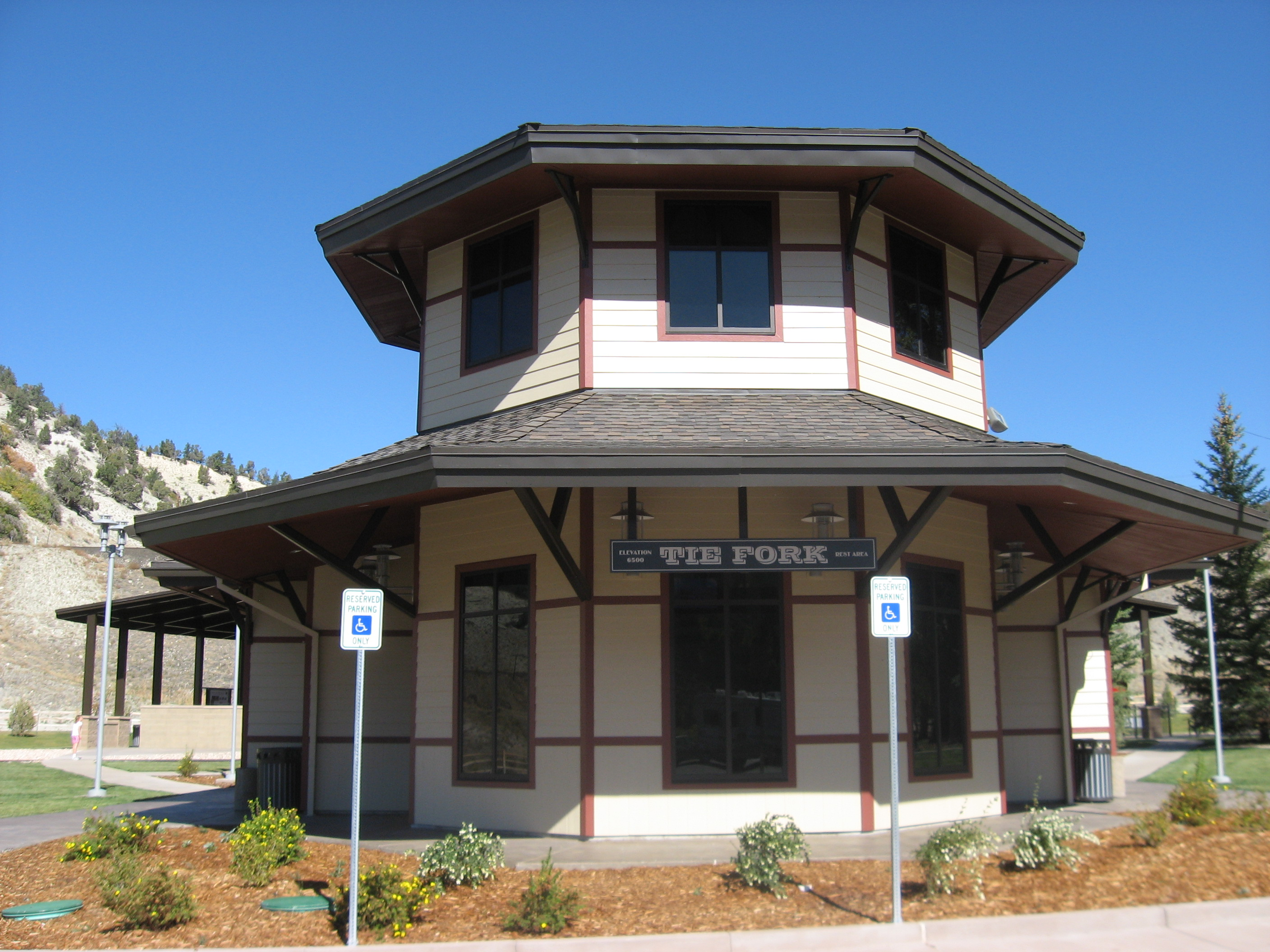
The replacement Tie Fork Rest Area is built in a railroad theme to honor the town of Tucker

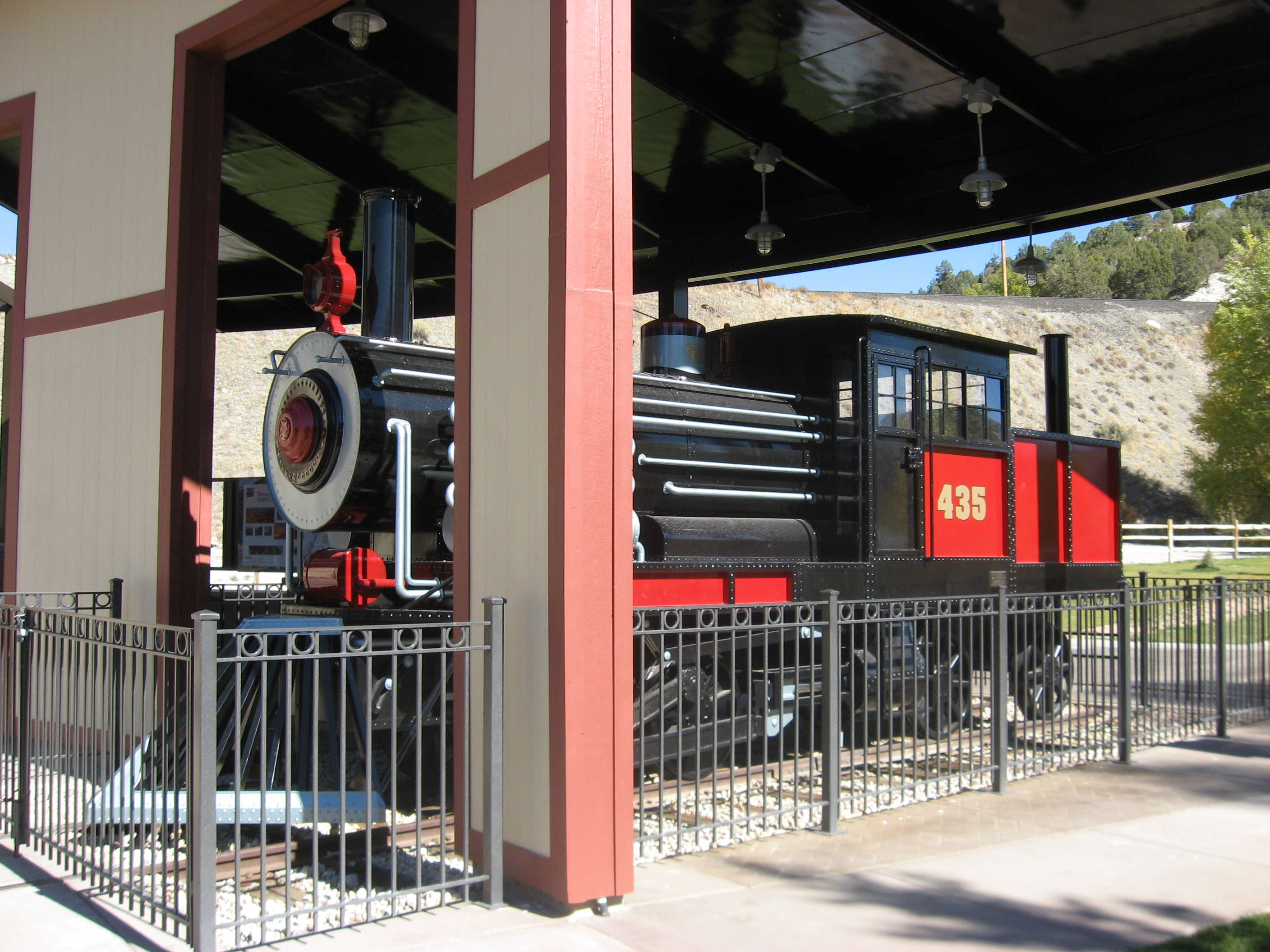
The replica steam locomotive at Tie Fork Rest Area

The town of Tucker was located near a sharp curve at the bottom of a 5% grade along U.S. Route 6. In 2009, the Utah Department of Transportation closed and buried the Tucker rest area to build a safer alignment, with a banked curve and reduced grade. In 2010, the department dedicated a replacement rest area about 2 miles (3.2 km) downstream from Tucker (mile post 202). The structure was named the Tie Fork Rest Area after the side canyon where it was located. The replacement rest area was designed to mimic an early 1900s era train depot to honor the town, including a replica roundhouse and non-functional steam locomotive built by Original Creations of Carbonville, Utah. The buildings were designed by the Archiplex Group of Salt Lake City. The rest area was voted one of the most beautiful buildings in the state of Utah in a contest sponsored by the American Institute of Architects. It is also one of the busiest non-freeway rest areas in the state.

The rest area was officially opened on 16 Aug 2010 and is supported financially by Carbon, Emery, Grand, and Utah counties, as well as the Manti-La Sal National Forest and Utah State Parks (Division of Utah State Parks and Recreation). Each of the sponsors have provided interpretive displays at the rest area and share the estimated annual $17,000 cost of maintenance.

== See also ==
- Tucker strike, a 1913 strike in Tucker
