= Bakrala railway station =

Railway station in Punjab, Pakistan

Coordinates: 33°05′N 73°26′E

Bakrala Railway Station بکڑالا ریلوے اسٹیشن
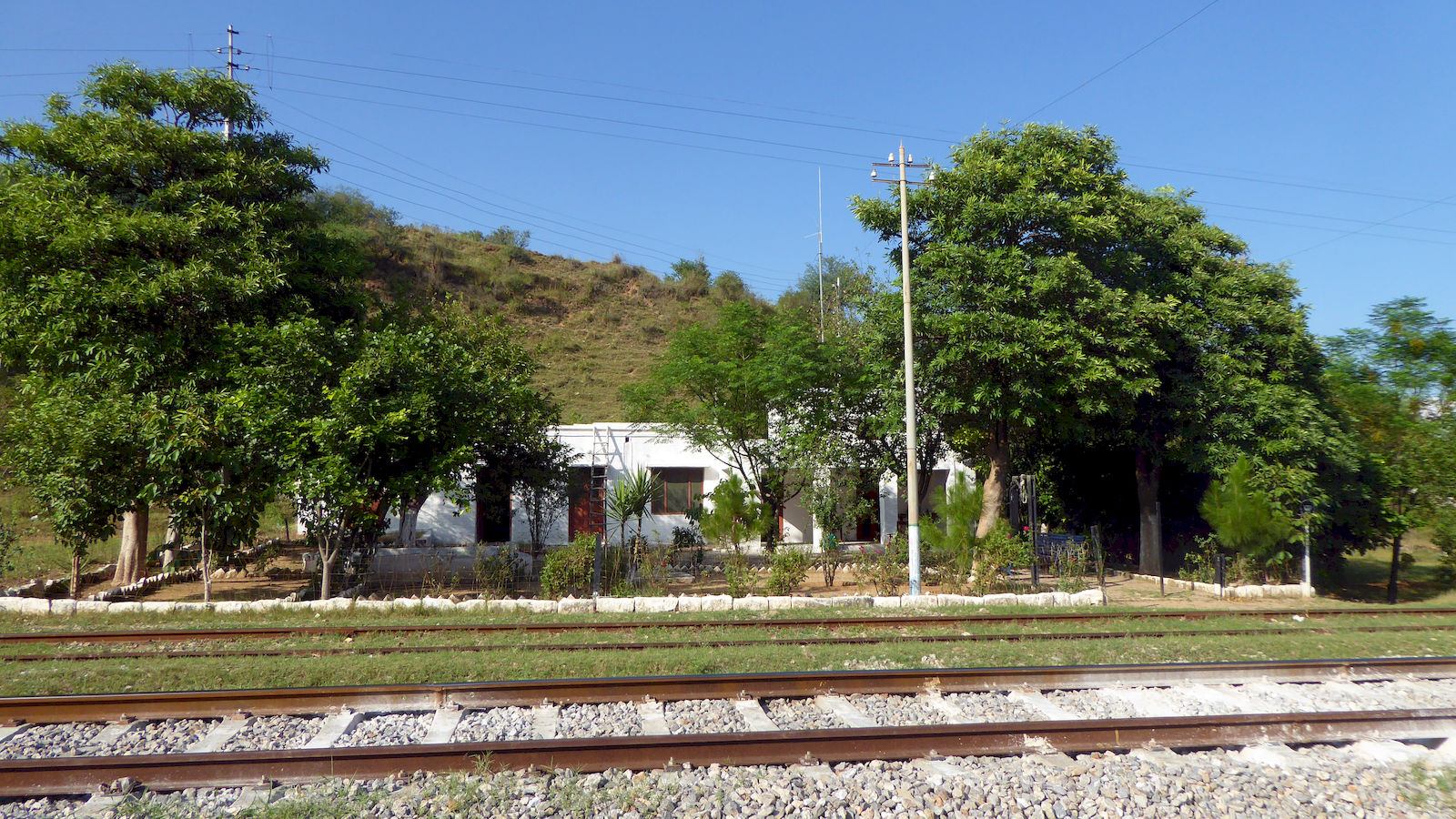

General information
- Owner: Ministry of Railways
- Line: Karachi–Peshawar Railway Line

Other information
- Station code: BKRA

Services
Preceding station	Pakistan Railways	Following station
Domeli towards Kiamari	Karachi–Peshawar Line	Tarki towards Peshawar Cantonment
Location

Bakrala Railway Station (Urdu and Punjabi: بکڑالا ریلوے اسٹیشن) is an abandoned railway station located in Bakrala village, Sohawa Tehsil, Jhelum district, Punjab province, Pakistan.

== See also ==
- List of railway stations in Pakistan
- Pakistan Railways

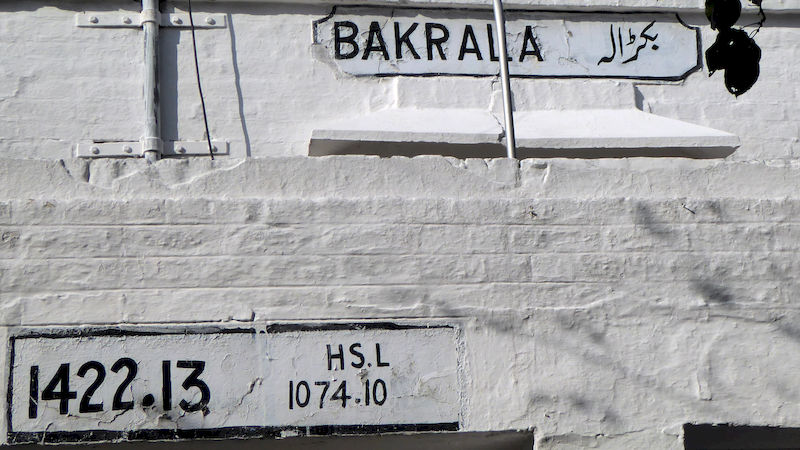
Bakrala railway station tag
