= Soldier Summit, Utah =

- Unincorporated community
- Interactive map of Soldier Summit, Utah
- Country: United States
- State: Utah
- County: Wasatch
- Founded: 1919
- Incorporated: 1921
- Disincorporated: 1984
- Founder: H.C. Mears
- Time zone: Mountain (MST)
  - Summer (DST): MDT

Soldier Summit
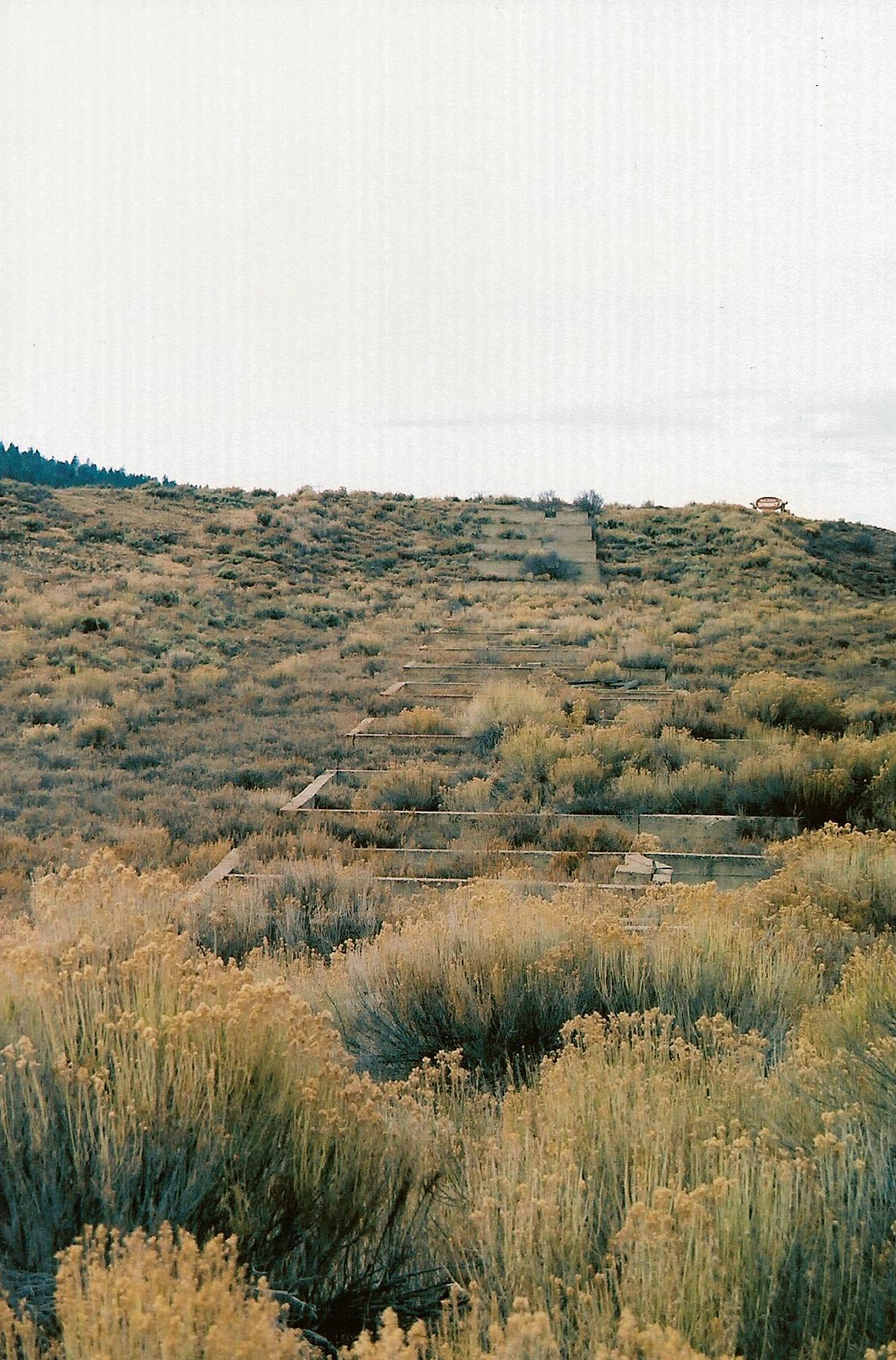
- One of several rows of foundations left at Soldier Summit

- Location within Utah
- Elevation: 7,477 ft (2,279 m)
- Traversed by: US 6 Central Corridor

Location
- Location: Wasatch County, Utah; United States
- Range: Wasatch Mountains
- Coordinates: 39°55′43″N 111°04′59″W

Historical population
Census	Pop.	Note	%±
1920	270		—
1930	319		18.1%
1940	97		−69.6%
1950	93		−4.1%
1960	33		−64.5%
1970	13		−60.6%
1980	12		−7.7%

Soldier Summit is the name of both a mountain pass in the Wasatch Mountains in Utah, United States and an unincorporated community that is a near-ghost town located at the pass. Soldier Summit has been an important transportation route between the Wasatch Front and Price, Utah, since the area was settled by the Mormon pioneers. It is on the route of both U.S. Route 6 and the old main line of the Denver and Rio Grande Western Railroad (D&RGW), now the Provo Subdivision of the Central Corridor. Located where the road makes a brief bend through the extreme southwest corner of Wasatch County, Soldier Summit historically had more to do with nearby Utah County.

At one time both the state highway department and the railroad had operations at the summit, but with the exception of a gas station that is sometimes open, the town site is now abandoned. Today it is a popular rest stop and photo spot for railfans. Many railfans also take pictures of the Gilluly loops, a series of horseshoe curves on the western approach to the summit. The California Zephyr Amtrak passenger train uses this route.

== History ==
Spanish Friars Francisco Atanasio Domínguez and Silvestre Vélez de Escalante are credited with discovering the pass in 1776, but it was certainly used by Native Americans before them. The summit takes its name from a group of soldiers who were caught in an unexpected snowstorm on the summit in July 1861. These soldiers were Southerners, previously under Union General Philip St. George Cooke at Camp Floyd, on their way to join the Confederate Army. Some of them died in the storm and were buried on the summit.

In 1919, a real estate promoter named H.C. Mears surveyed a townsite at Soldier Summit and began to sell building lots. The town was incorporated in 1921. There were stores, hotels, saloons, restaurants, two churches, and a school. Growth was driven by the D&RGW moving some of its machine shops, used for servicing helper engines, to Soldier Summit from Helper. The Church of Jesus Christ of Latter-day Saints organized a branch in the new town on June 21, 1921, with Parley Bills as branch president. The number of Mormons in the town was large enough in June 1927 to organize a ward with Walter S. Groesbeck as bishop. The population of Soldier Summit peaked at 2,500 in the 1920s, but began to decline as the railroad decided to move its operations back to Helper due to the severe winters and high cost of doing business at the summit. The introduction of diesel locomotives, and the realignment of the tracks through Tucker and Gilluly which reduced the grade from 4% to 2%, eliminated the need to place helper engines at the site, and further hurt the town's fortunes. The railroad moved many employees' homes to Helper, leaving only the foundations. By January 1930, the ward was reduced to a branch.

Over the next few decades, the town dwindled away. In 1948 there were 47 students at the Soldier Summit school. The next year enrollment dropped to 11, but the school stayed open. It was not until 1973 that the school was closed and the last few students sent to schools in Carbon County.

By 1979 there were only about a dozen adult residents left, but Soldier Summit still had four part-time police officers enforcing a community speed limit on the stretch of highway passing through town. When motorists complained of a speed trap, the state attorney general and the Utah Chief of Police Association investigated. They determined that the only reason for having a police department in Soldier Summit at all was to generate revenue for municipal services through traffic tickets. The police department was disbanded.

The town was finally disincorporated in 1984. Other than the gas station and two or three occupied houses, Soldier Summit is uninhabited. An old two-room jail, a few deserted houses, and several acres of foundations and crumbling walls are all that remains of the former town.

== Railroad ==
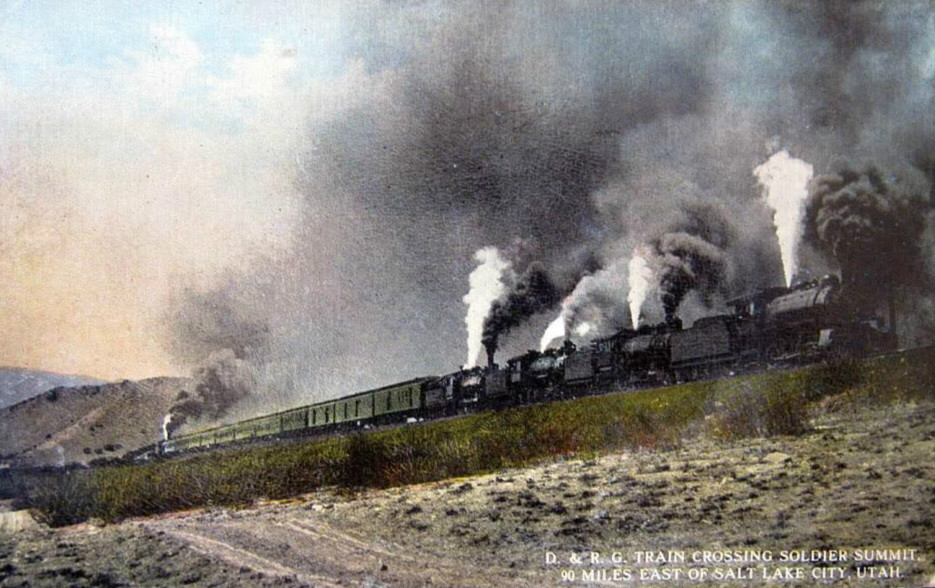
Depiction of a Denver and Rio Grande Western train climbing the summit, circa 1915. There are 5 locomotives used—four at the front and one at the back.

Helper derives its name from Soldier Summit. During the age of steam, the railroad stored helper engines at Helper. They placed the helpers on freight trains to climb the grades to the summit. Soldier Summit is the fifth-highest summit or pass on a U.S. transcontinental railroad main line after Tennessee Pass, Moffat Tunnel, Sherman Hill Summit, and Raton Pass.
