= Domeli railway station =

Railway station in Punjab, Pakistan

Coordinates: 33.03283°N 73.466492°E

Domeli Railway Station ڈومیلی ریلوے اسٹیشن
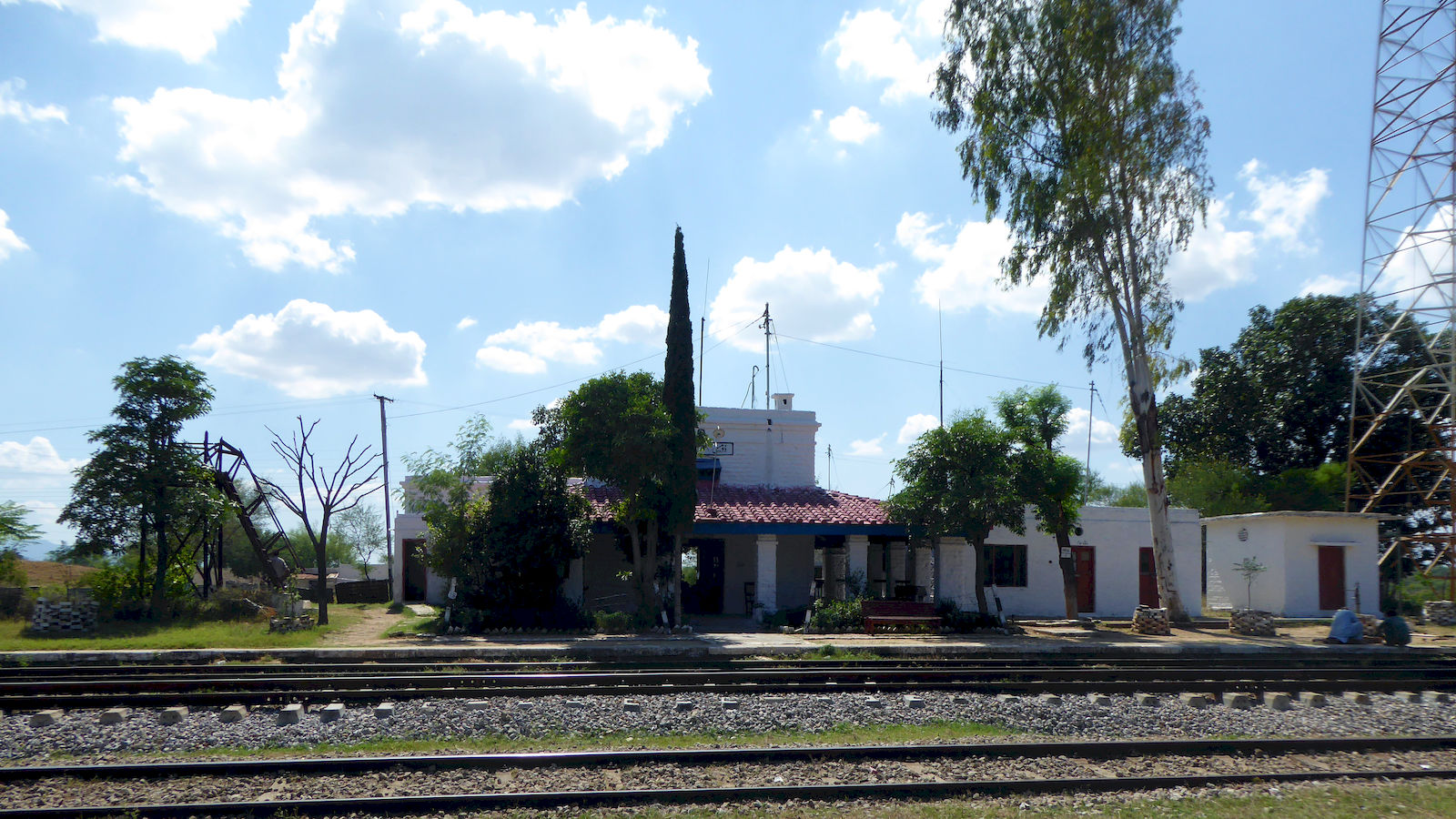

General information
- Owner: Ministry of Railways
- Line: Karachi–Peshawar Railway Line

Other information
- Station code: DMI

Services
Preceding station	Pakistan Railways	Following station
Ratial towards Kiamari	Karachi–Peshawar Line	Bakrala towards Peshawar Cantonment
Location

Domeli Railway Station (Urdu and Punjabi: ڈومیلی ریلوے اسٹیشن) is an abandoned railway station located in Domeli village, Jhelum district of Punjab province, Pakistan.

== See also ==
- List of railway stations in Pakistan
- Pakistan Railways

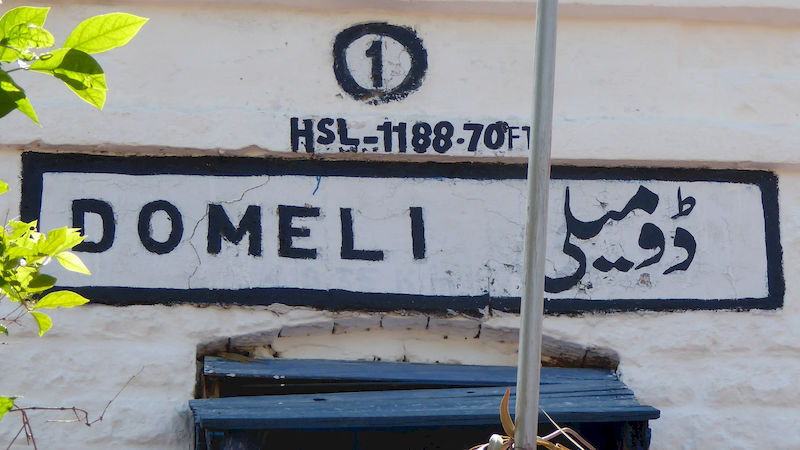
Domeli railway station tag
