= Utah Division (D&RGW) =

Rail line in Utah and Colorado

Utah Division Denver & Rio Grande Western Railroad
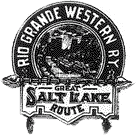

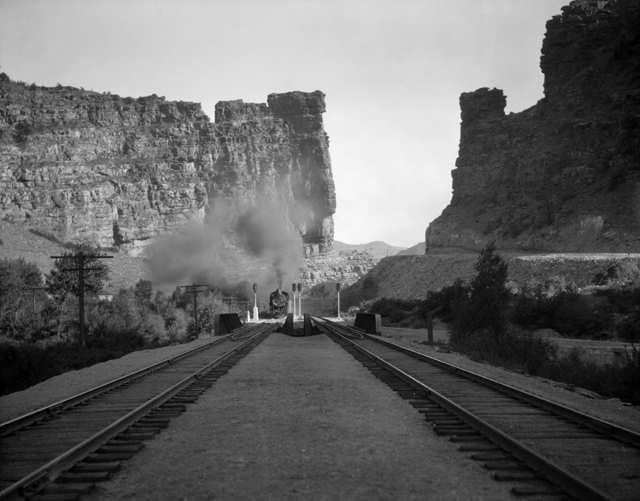
- Castle Gate in the Price Canyon, ca. 1929

Overview
- Locale: Utah, western Colorado
- Dates of operation: 1882–1992
- Successor: Southern Pacific Lines

Technical
- Track gauge: 4 ft 8 1/2 in (1,435 mm) standard gauge; originally 3 ft (914 mm)
- Length: 332.3 miles (534.8 km)

The Utah Division of the former Denver & Rio Grande Western Railroad (D&RGW) is a rail line that connects Grand Junction, Colorado and Salt Lake City, Utah (formerly Ogden) in the Western United States. It is now incorporated into the Union Pacific Railroad (UP) system as part of the Central Corridor. The modern Union Pacific has split the line into two subdivisions for operational purposes, the Green River Subdivision between Grand Junction and Helper, Utah and the Provo Subdivision from Helper to Salt Lake City. Daily passenger service is provided by Amtrak's California Zephyr; the BNSF Railway and Utah Railway have trackage rights over the line.

The line dates back to the early 1880s, when the predecessors of the D&RGW completed a 3 ft (914 mm) narrow gauge line through the Royal Gorge, over Marshall Pass, through the Black Canyon of the Gunnison, across the Utah desert, and over Soldier Summit. It was rebuilt to standard gauge in 1890, and has since remained a through line, often serving as parts of larger networks including the Gould transcontinental system, Southern Pacific, and now the Union Pacific.

The division also included a number of branch lines, the longest being the Marysvale Branch through the Sevier Valley.

== Route description ==
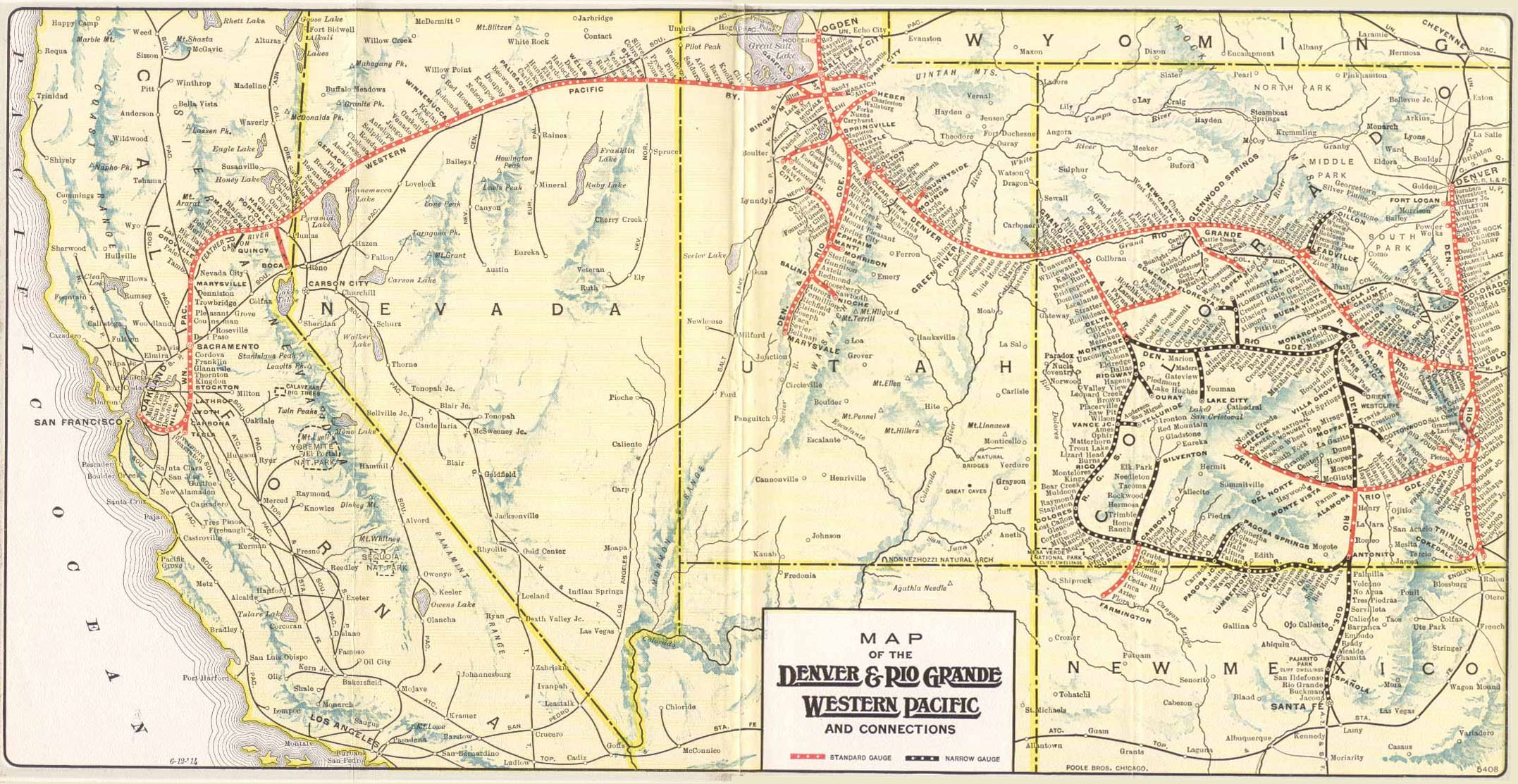

== History ==
=== Construction: 1870s to 1883 ===
When the Denver & Rio Grande Railway (D&RG) was chartered in 1870, it had the goal of connecting Denver with El Paso, Texas. But when it reached Raton Pass in 1878, it found that the Atchison, Topeka and Santa Fe Railroad had beaten it to the best crossing into New Mexico. After several years of financially draining battle, the two companies came to an agreement in 1880, and the D&RG, under the direction of William J. Palmer, set its sights on Salt Lake City.

In the meantime, the Utah and Pleasant Valley Railway (U&PV) had built a 3-foot (914mm) narrow gauge line from the coal mines in the Pleasant Valley to Provo on the Union Pacific Railroad-controlled Utah Southern Railroad. The company was incorporated on December 11, 1875, under the general laws of Utah by owners of land in the valley. The company began grading in April 1877 and track laying on August 29, 1878, driving the last spike between Pleasant Valley and Springville on November 5, 1879. The short distance in the Utah Valley from Springville to the larger city of Provo, which closely paralleled the Utah Southern, opened in October 1880. Investor Charles W. Scofield of New York, who was already in control of two other narrow gauge mining roads - the Bingham Canyon and Camp Floyd Rail Road since 1873 and the Wasatch and Jordan Valley Railroad since 1875 - acquired the U&PV in October 1878.

The U&PV began at a mine in the Pleasant Valley south of Scofield, heading north along the present Pleasant Valley Subdivision to the Scofield Reservoir. The old grade has been flooded until it leaves the lake to the north, rising to an elevation of 7,967 feet (2,428 m) above sea level before descending, via a pair of switchbacks, to Starvation Creek. The valley of that creek took the railroad to the Spanish Fork Canyon, and the later D&RGW, at Tucker. The remainder of the U&PV is now, for the most part, still operated, as it follows Spanish Fork Canyon into the Utah Valley.

The Central Pacific Coal & Coke Co. Ltd. of London chartered the San Pete Valley Railroad in 1873 to develop its mining properties in Utah. Opened in 1882, the narrow-gauge line ran 30 miles from Nephi to the parent company's coal deposits at Wales, was extended 35 miles to Moroni in 1884, to Manti (43 miles) in 1893, and to Morrison (51 miles) in 1894. The D&RG purchased the railroad in 1907.

Associates of Palmer incorporated the Sevier Valley Railway in Utah on December 7, 1880, with a route paralleling the Union Pacific's lines from the railroad center of Ogden south through Salt Lake City and Provo to Nephi, and then continuing through Salt Creek Canyon and the Sanpete Valley to Salina in the Sevier Valley. There it would split, one line continuing south to the Arizona state line, and the other turning east through Salina Canyon and across the Castle Valley to the Grand (Colorado) River, following it to meet the westward-building D&RG at the Colorado border. To counter this threat to its monopoly, the Union Pacific set up the Utah Southern and Castle Valley Railroad less than two weeks later to extend its Utah Southern through Salina Canyon to the Castle Valley. In another week, when UP workers reached the canyon, the Sevier Valley had already begun grading.

On May 26, 1881, D&RG interests incorporated the Salt Lake and Park City Railway, a branch from Salt Lake City east to Park City and Coalville. The lines of this company and the Sevier Valley were included in the far-reaching charter for the Denver & Rio Grande Western Railway, incorporated on July 21, 1881 and immediately consolidated with the others. Palmer knew that it would be important to first complete the line to Ogden, where the Central Pacific Railroad extended west to California. It was rumored as early as April 1881 that the D&RG had gained control of the U&PV and would bypass Salina Canyon, instead using a shorter route northwesterly from Castle Valley to a connection with that road, and Palmer confirmed this in September. (The original grading through Castle Valley was never used for a railroad, although in the 1910s it was briefly part of the Midland Trail, now US-6.) The D&RGW bought the assets of the Wasatch and Jordan Valley Railroad, which had merged with the Bingham Canon and Camp Floyd Rail Road, at foreclosure on December 31, 1881, adding to its system two profitable branches from Midvale to Bingham and Little Cottonwood Canyons.

The D&RGW similarly acquired the U&PV's property on June 14, 1882, and at about that time began operating trains between Salt Lake City and Pleasant Valley, using new trackage north of Provo. The D&RG of Colorado leased the D&RGW of Utah on August 1, allowing the former to operate the latter for a payment of 40% of gross receipts. The difficult double switchback on the original U&PV was bypassed by a new connection to the under-construction D&RGW at Colton on November 23, 1882, as well as the new line from Colton over Soldier Summit to Tucker. D&RG and D&RGW crews met at a point now known as Desert, 14 miles (23 km) west of Green River, on March 30, 1883, and trains began running between Denver and Salt Lake City several days later. (Although the D&RG built the line from the state line to Desert, it was owned by the D&RGW.) Final completion to Ogden in May was delayed for several days by the Union Pacific's refusal to let the D&RGW cross, but on May 19 the D&RGW was complete. Palmer soon resigned as D&RG president, since the directors were opposed to further expansion, but remained in control of the leased D&RGW.

=== Retrenchment and turmoil: 1883 to 1901 ===
With the line into Utah complete, the D&RG system consisted of a narrow gauge main line from Denver to Ogden, passing through or over Colorado Springs, Pueblo, the Royal Gorge, Salida, Marshall Pass, Gunnison, the Black Canyon of the Gunnison, Montrose, Grand Junction, Green River, and Salt Lake City. It included numerous branches, but only three west of Grand Junction - to Pleasant Valley, Bingham Canyon, and Little Cottonwood Canyon. The main line began by following the valley of the Grand (Colorado) River west out of Grand Junction, but curved away at Mack to avoid Ruby Canyon. Some steep grades and sharp curves carried the original line over the highlands north of the river, crossing the state line and continuing southwesterly and westerly to Green River, Utah. Curving northwest around the Beckwith Plateau, the railroad crossed the Price River at Woodside, where it began to follow that river through its valleys and canyons. Almost immediately, due to flooding, the railroad had to be removed from the canyon between Grassy Trail (south of Cedar) and Farnham (southeast of Wellington), though it remained alongside the river from Grassy Trail southeast to Woodside until bypassed by the present standard gauge alignment. Continuing on, the line passed through the Price Canyon, including the Castle Gate rock formation, as it rose to the top of the Wasatch Range at Soldier Summit. The Spanish Fork Canyon took the line down into the Utah Valley, with some 4% grades near the top before it met the earlier U&PV at Tucker. Through the Utah Valley and adjacent Salt Lake Valley, connected by the Jordan Narrows, the D&RGW's line closely paralleled a UP line, serving many of the valleys' populated areas. The final stretch generally followed the Great Salt Lake's shore to Ogden, where it connected to the Central Pacific Railroad.

The expansion resulted in a large debt that the D&RG was unable to pay the interest on. D&RGW president Palmer and D&RG president Frederick Lovejoy got into an argument over the management and payment of rental for the leased D&RGW. Unable to break the lease, Lovejoy ordered the tracks torn up at the state line in retaliation, costing both railroads the Chicago, Burlington and Quincy Railroad's through traffic. The D&RG entered receivership on July 12, 1884 and the D&RGW on August 12, with D&RGW superintendent W. H. Bancroft being appointed to the Utah company. The two companies resumed friendly relations, and after the D&RG reorganized on July 14, 1886, it terminated the lease of the D&RGW on July 31, giving the latter company significant amounts of rolling stock. Palmer returned to his position as D&RGW president, the company having been released from receivership.

Now independent, the D&RGW looked to the east, where the standard gauge Colorado Midland Railway was building west from Colorado Springs with the intent of entering Utah. Palmer realized that if he did not widen his gauge and cooperate with the Midland, he might soon have new competition. To raise the money to convert the line, which would require about 100 miles (160 km) of new railroad where the existing grade was too steep or curvy, he incorporated a new Rio Grande Western Railway. (Palmer had initially proposed the name "Utah and Colorado Railway" for the new company.) The State Line and Denver Railway was incorporated May 16, 1889 with the power to build east to Glenwood Springs, Colorado, then the terminus of the Midland. That same day, it was consolidated with the old Denver & Rio Grande Western Railway, with articles of incorporation filed in both states on June 24.

Construction began immediately, the line being converted from Ogden to Salt Lake City by mid-November 1889, to Provo on March 7, 1890, and the rest of the way to Grand Junction on June 10. The line was completely relocated out of the canyon of the Price River from Grassy Trail to Woodside, and into the Ruby Canyon of the Grand (Colorado) River from Whitehouse to Crevasse, Colorado. Beyond Crevasse, the RGW leased the D&RG track to Grand Junction in December 1889 and subsequently widened its gauge. The Rio Grande Junction Railway, owned jointly by the D&RG and Midland, was completed to Grand Junction on November 15, 1890, and through service began the next day over the RGW and both eastern roads, the D&RG having completed its standard gauge line over Tennessee Pass. All branches were also converted, except for short 3 ft (914 mm) gauge sections at the ends of the lines into Bingham and Little Cottonwood Canyons.

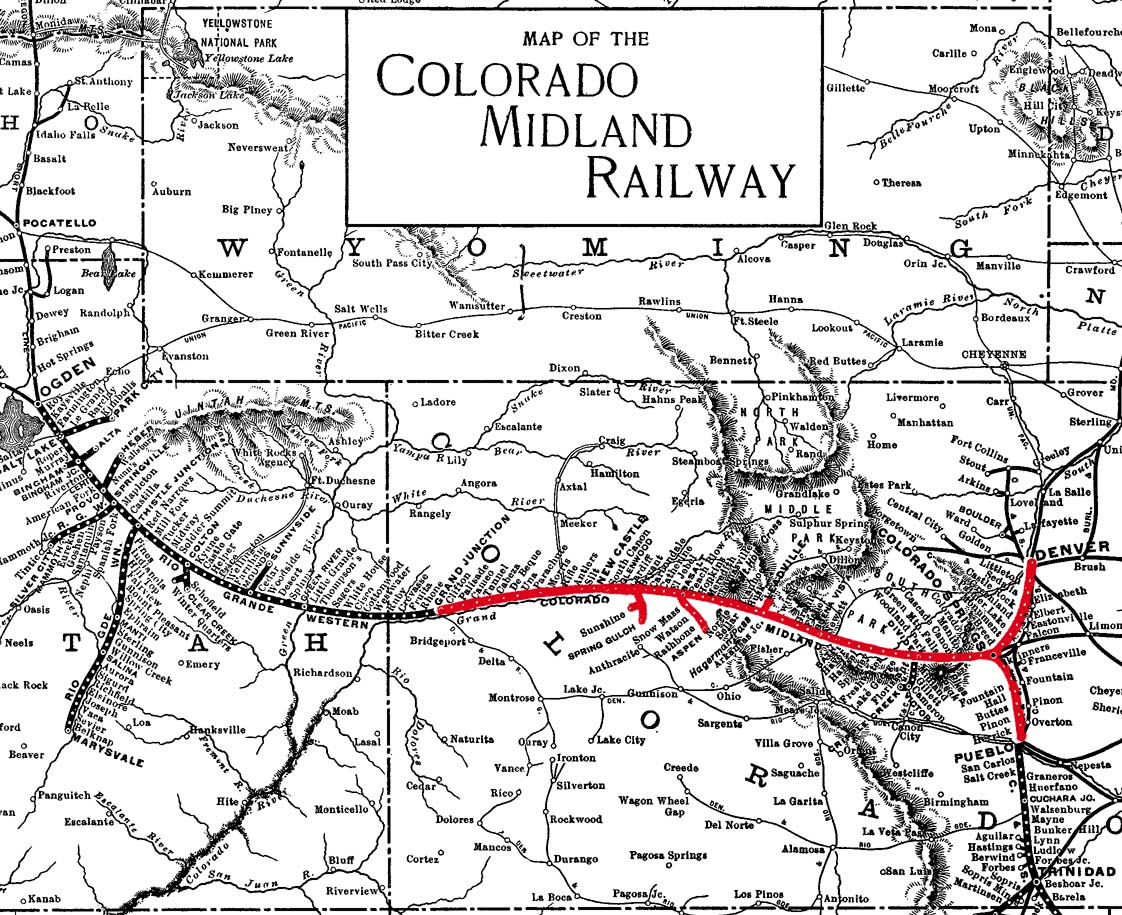
Ca. 1900 map of the Colorado Midland Railway (red), showing its connections to the Rio Grande Western Railway (black, left) and Colorado and Southern Railway (black, lower right)

For the next ten years, the RGW operated as an independent standard gauge bridge line connecting Grand Junction to Salt Lake City and Ogden, with branches to sources of valuable minerals. Through its new subsidiary, the Utah Central Railroad, the RGW acquired several Salt Lake City-area lines in 1898, finally adding to its system the branch to Park City through Parley's Canyon that had been chartered in 1881. The RGW teamed up with the Colorado and Southern Railway, which had recently been split from the bankrupt Union Pacific Railroad, and stretched north–south from Wyoming through eastern Colorado into Texas, to jointly buy control of the connecting Colorado Midland Railway. RGW's publicly listed share prices rose, delaying a takeover by the D&RG until George Gould arrived. Gould, owner of the Missouri Pacific Railroad (MP), wished to create a transcontinental railroad system, and identified the D&RG/RGW as the best route west into Utah. The MP began buying D&RG stock in 1900, and the D&RG did the same with the RGW. Palmer still owned a controlling interest in the RGW, but he came to an agreement to sell the company to Gould, and Gould management, including new president Edward Turner Jeffery, took over on July 1, 1901.

=== Gould control and aftermath: 1901 to present ===
In 1901, the Union Pacific Railroad gained control of the Southern Pacific Railroad, which owned the Central Pacific Railway, the portion of the First transcontinental railroad west of Ogden. Searching for another route to the Pacific, Gould incorporated the Castle Valley Railway as a cutoff from the RGW's main line near Farnham to the Marysvale Branch at Salina and beyond to the under-construction San Pedro, Los Angeles and Salt Lake Railroad (Salt Lake Route) at Milford. However, the Union Pacific gained control of the Salt Lake Route in mid-1903, forcing Gould to construct an entirely new line to California. The financing of the Western Pacific Railway (WP) would take almost all the revenues of the MP, D&RG, and RGW, leaving very little for maintenance, let alone improvements. The D&RG and RGW, operated as a single system since 1901, were merged as the Denver & Rio Grande Western Railroad on July 31, 1908, finally combining the two halves of the Denver-Ogden line into one railroad company.

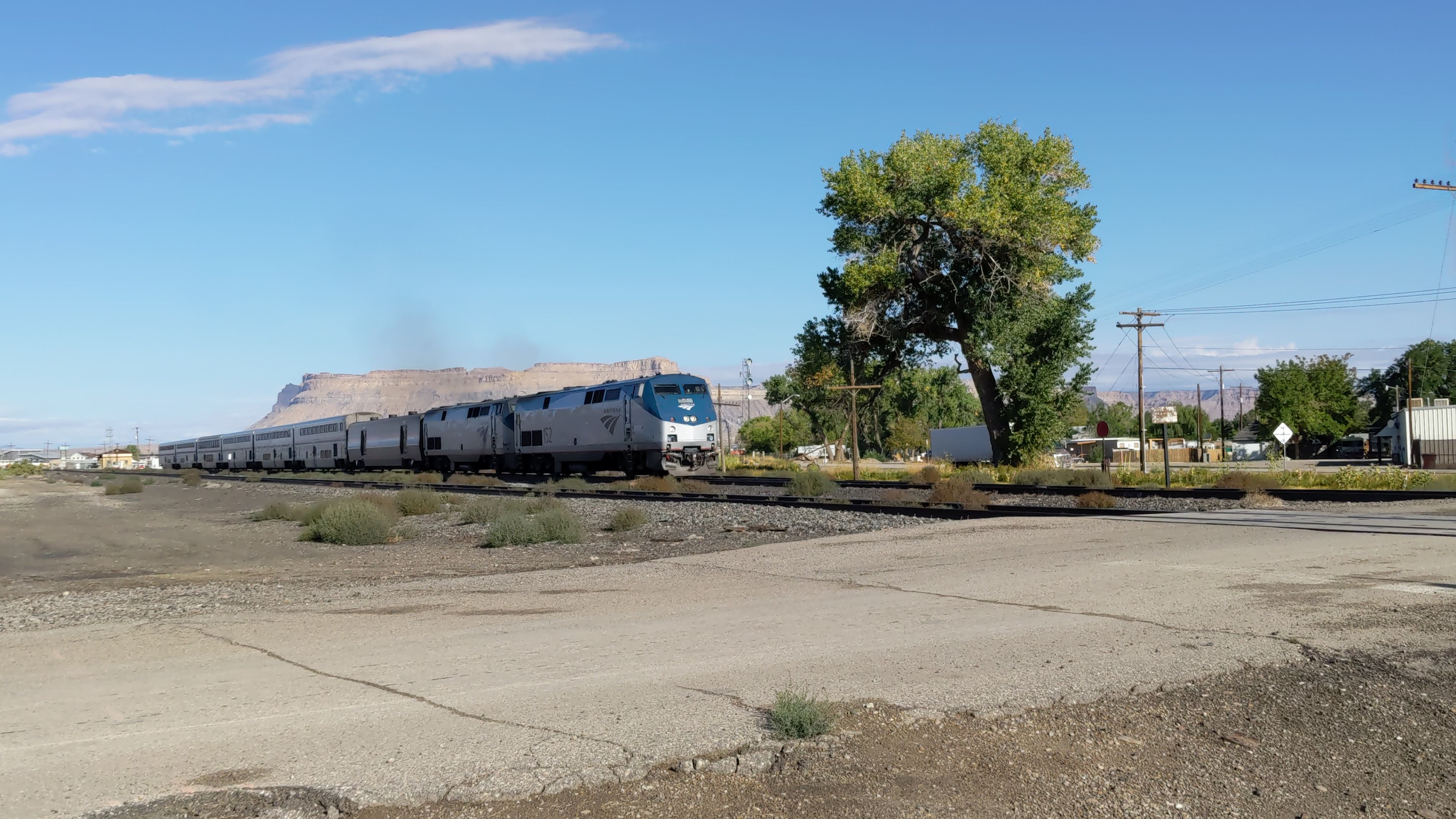
Amtrak's California Zephyr departs Green River.

Improvement of the standard gauge main line through Utah to relieve congestion had begun in 1898, when the RGW added a second track to the steep 4% grade to Tucker on the west side of Soldier Summit. The shallower east-side grade was similarly doubled to Colton in 1906, and further to Kyune and from Castle Gate to Helper in 1909. Construction began on a new low-grade line west of the summit in 1912, when the D&RG added a track between Detour (the west end of the realignment) and Thistle. The new line, with a double hairpin curve, was completed the next year, as was a second track between Kyune and Castle Gate, completing a double-track line between Thistle and Helper, with a maximum grade of 2.4% on the east slope and 2.0% on the west. Local competition arrived in 1912, when the United States Smelting, Refining and Mining Company, which owned coal mines southwest of Price, organized the Utah Railway (originally the Utah Coal Railway). U.S. Smelting objected to the D&RG's charging of higher freight rates due to the mines' location on a branch line, and began to build its own line over Soldier Summit into the Utah Valley. The two companies reached an agreement in November 1913, where the D&RG would operate the Utah Railway between a junction near Castle Gate and the mines, and the unfinished line between Thistle and Provo would be completed as a second track. This arrangement began with the completion of the road in 1914, and the D&RG now had a double-track line between Provo and Helper. Three years later, the Utah Railway began independent operations between the mines and Provo under a reciprocal trackage rights arrangement that has persisted to the present, where each company allows the other to use its half of the double-track line.

The WP was completed in 1910, but its construction had given the D&RG enormous debts. After periods of ownership by Eastern U.S. bankers, the courts appointed two local trustees in 1935. The system was slowly rebuilt into a profitable enterprise, and in 1947 it was reorganized as the Denver & Rio Grande Western Railroad. After buying the Southern Pacific Transportation Company in 1988 and adopting the latter's name, the D&RGW became part of the Union Pacific Railroad in 1996.

With the level of the Great Salt Lake rising in the mid-1980s, the D&RGW and UP came to a trackage rights agreement, where the D&RGW would use the UP's higher line between Salt Lake City and Ogden, and in exchange the UP could use the D&RGW between Salt Lake City and Provo, a better-designed route than the UP's. The majority of the ex-D&RGW north of Salt Lake City is now the Denver & Rio Grande Western Rail Trail, while the UP has sold its Sharp Subdivision north of Provo to the Utah Transit Authority, which operates the TRAX Blue Line (light rail) along the corridor, as well as contracts with the Salt Lake City Southern Railroad for freight.

=== Branches ===
In 1873, the Central Pacific Coal & Coke Company, Ltd. of London chartered the narrow-gauge San Pete Valley Railroad to connect its 10,000 acres of coal property in Wales, Utah to the Utah Southern Railroad at Nephi, Utah (about 30 miles). This was later extended to Manti and Morrison. The Denver & Rio Grande bought all the securities of the SPV in 1907.

A long branch was begun in 1890 as 3 ft (914 mm) gauge and widened in 1891, extending south from Thistle up Thistle Creek and down the San Pitch River to Manti. It was extended south to Sevier in 1891, via the Sevier River, by the Sevier Railway, and that same year the Tintic Range Railway built from Springville southwest and west to Eureka in the Tintic Mountains. The RGW organized both of these companies to be owned by RGW stockholders, but out of the control of RGW bondholders. The Panic of 1893 stopped new construction until 1896, when the Sevier Railway was extended farther south to Belknap.

The Ballard & Thompson Railroad between Thompson Springs and Sego was purchased in 1913 by the D&RGW and became the Sego Branch.

The Rio Grande obtained control of the narrow gauge Wasatch & Jordan Valley Railway in 1881 which had been built up Little Cottonwood Canyon. Portions of the line would be standard gauged as far as Wasatch station by 1913. From Wasatch to the line's terminus at Alta, Utah would remain narrow gauge, the Rio Grande's last narrow gauge in the state of Utah. Rather than operating the line themselves the Rio Grande would lease it to various operators such as the horse-drawn Alta Tramway and later the Shay locomotive powered Little Cottonwood Transportation Company until 1922. Postal service and passenger service on the narrow gauge was provided from 1922 to 1928 by a "jitney" service operated by Elbert Despain on an automobile converted for rail service. Following the end of jitney service, the Rio Grande abandoned access to the mouth of Little Cottonwood Canyon in 1933 along with the narrow gauge route up the canyon. Segments of Utah State Route 210 follow the former railroad grade up the canyon. Full abandonment of the surviving segments of the remaining Sandy branch would occur in 1965.

In the future, a new rail line into the Uintah Basin, currently under study by the state of Utah, may be constructed, branching off the existing line near Soldier Summit.

== Presidents ==
This is a list of presidents (and equivalents) of the Utah company before it was merged into the D&RG in 1908. For post-1908 presidents, see Denver & Rio Grande Western Railroad Presidents.

- William J. Palmer, 1881–1884
- W. H. Bancroft, 1884–1886 (receiver)
- William J. Palmer, 1886–1901
- Edward Turner Jeffery, 1901–1908

== Station listing ==
County	Location	MP	Name	Notes
Mesa	Grand Junction	450.0	Grand Junction	Junction of Tennessee Pass Line/Moffat Line (1890–present) and Gunnison Line (1882–present)
Mesa	Grand Junction	451.7	Durham	
Mesa	Fruita	460.5	Fruita	
Mesa		468.9	Mack	Junction of Uintah Railway (1904–1939)
Mesa		473.1	Ruby	
Mesa		478.0	Shale	
Mesa		483.3	Utaline	Siding at the Utah-Colorado state line
Grand		488.4	Westwater	
Grand		498.1	Agate	
Grand		504.4	Cisco	
Grand		510.5	Whitehouse	
Grand		515.6	Elba	
Grand		520.7	Sagers	
Grand		528.1	Thompson	Junction with Ballard and Thompson Railroad (1912–1950)
Grand		533.8	Brendel	Junction with Cane Creek Branch (1962–present)
Grand		540.4	Floy	
Grand		546.9	Solitude	
Emery	Green River	555.2	Green River	
Emery		561.5	Sphinx	
Emery		567.6	Desert	
Emery		574.2	Cliff	
Emery		581.4	Woodside	
Emery		586.6	Grassy	
Emery		593.1	Cedar	
Emery		602.9	Mounds	Junction with Sunnyside Branch (1899–present)
Carbon		611.3	Wash	
Carbon	Wellington	613.0	Wellington	
Carbon	Price	619.1	Price	
Carbon		622.1	Maxwell	
Carbon			Spring Glen	Junction with Kenilworth and Helper Railway (1907–1926)
Carbon	Helper	626.4	Helper	Junction with Kenilworth Branch (1926-1960s) and Spring Canyon Branch (1912-1970s)
Carbon		628.8	Utah Railway Junction	Junction with Utah Railway (1914–present)
Carbon		630.4	Castle Gate	
Carbon		632.0	Lynn	
Utah		638.9	Kyune	Junction with Jennings and Potter's Quarry Branch (1892–1917)
Utah		644.8	Colton	Junction with Pleasant Valley Branch (1882–present)
Wasatch		651.4	Summit	
Utah		661.0	Gilluly	Name of the horseshoe curves at this siding
Utah			Tucker	Original junction with Pleasant Valley Branch (1882)
Utah		665.6	Detour	Refers to this being the western end of a reroute up the grade to Soldier Summit, the old grade is today used by U.S. Route 6
Utah		672.3	Narrows	
Utah		676.7	Rio	
Utah		681.0	Thistle	Junction with Marysvale Branch (1890–1983)
Utah		684.4	Castilla	
Utah	Springville	695.8	Springville	Junction with Tintic Branch (1891–present)
Utah		698.6	Ironton	
Utah	Provo	701.1	Provo	Junction with Orem Branch (1946-1970s) and Provo Canyon Branch (1899–1970)
Utah	Orem	705.7	Lakota	
Utah	Orem	707.1	Geneva	
Utah	Orem	708.4	Pipe Mill	
Utah	American Fork	715.0	American Fork	
Utah	Lehi	720.3	Mesa	
Salt Lake	Draper	728.6	Riverton	
Salt Lake	Midvale	734.9	Midvale	Junction with Bingham Branch (1882–present) and Little Cottonwood Branch (1882–1964)
Salt Lake	South Salt Lake	742.0	Roper	Former name of the freight yard still at this location, Junction with Park City Branch (1900–2005)
Salt Lake	Salt Lake City	745.1	Salt Lake City	
Salt Lake	Salt Lake City	745.5	Grant Tower	
Salt Lake	Salt Lake City	748.7	Becks	
Davis	North Salt Lake	750.3	North Salt Lake	
Davis	West Bountiful	753.9	Woods Cross	
Davis	Farmington		Farmington	Junction with Lake Park Branch (1887–1925)
Davis	Clearfield	770.4	Clearfield	
Weber	Roy		Roy	Junction with Hooper Branch (1905–1959)
Weber	Ogden	779.3	Sugar Works	
Weber	Ogden	782.0	Ogden	

== See also ==
- List of Denver and Rio Grande Western Railroad lines
