= Sohawa railway station =

Railway station in Punjab, Pakistan

Sohawa Railway Station سوہاوہ ریلوے اسٹیشن
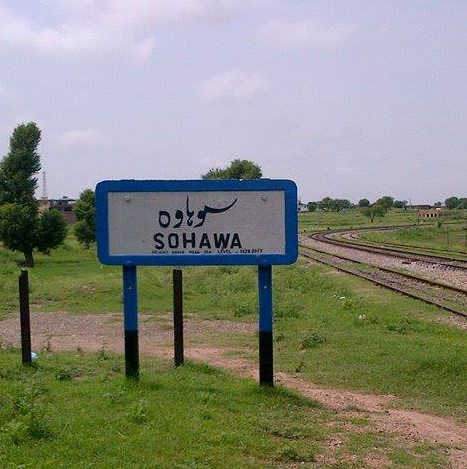

General information
- Coordinates: 33.1316°N 73.4298°E
- Owner: Ministry of Railways
- Line: Karachi–Peshawar Railway Line

Other information
- Station code: SHA

History
- Opened: 1897

Passengers
- Awam express

Services
Preceding station	Pakistan Railways	Following station
Tarki towards Kiamari	Karachi–Peshawar Line	Missa Keswal towards Peshawar Cantonment
Location

Sohawa Railway Station (Urdu and Punjabi: سوہاوہ ریلوے اسٹیشن) is located in Sohawa, Jhelum district of Punjab province of the Pakistan.

== Gallery ==
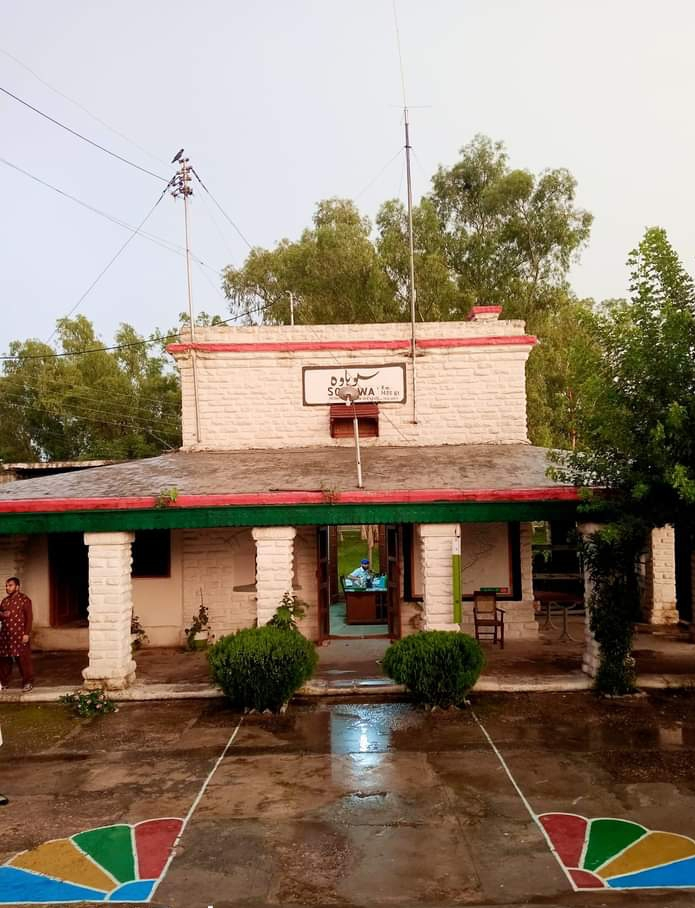

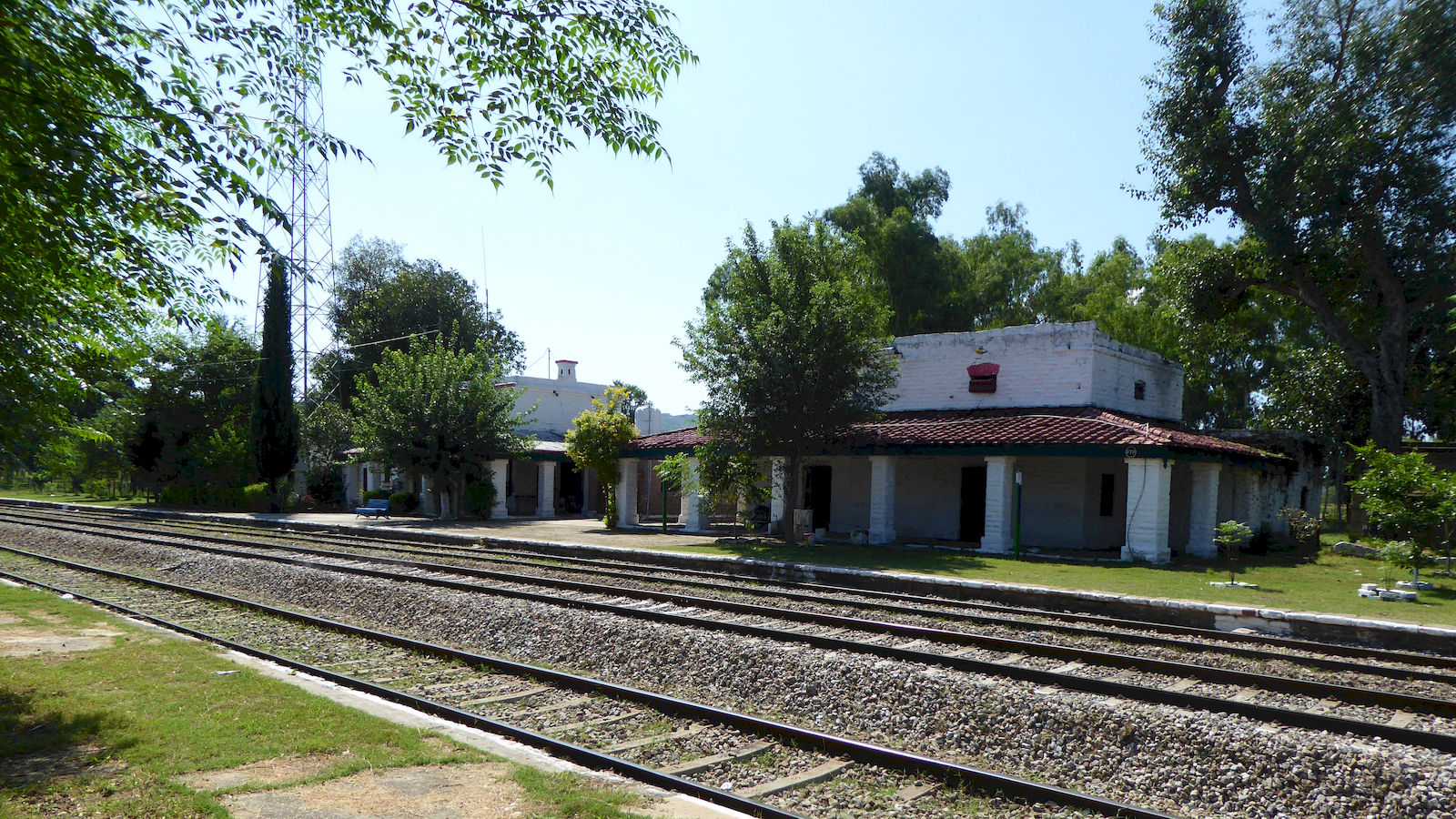

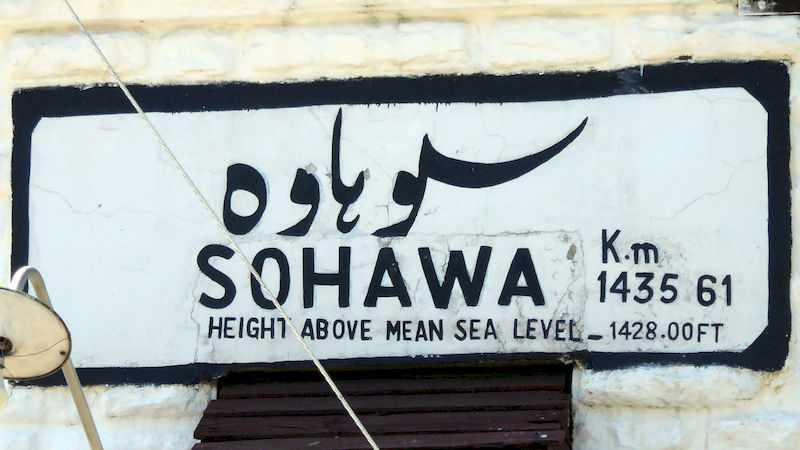
Sohawa railway station tag

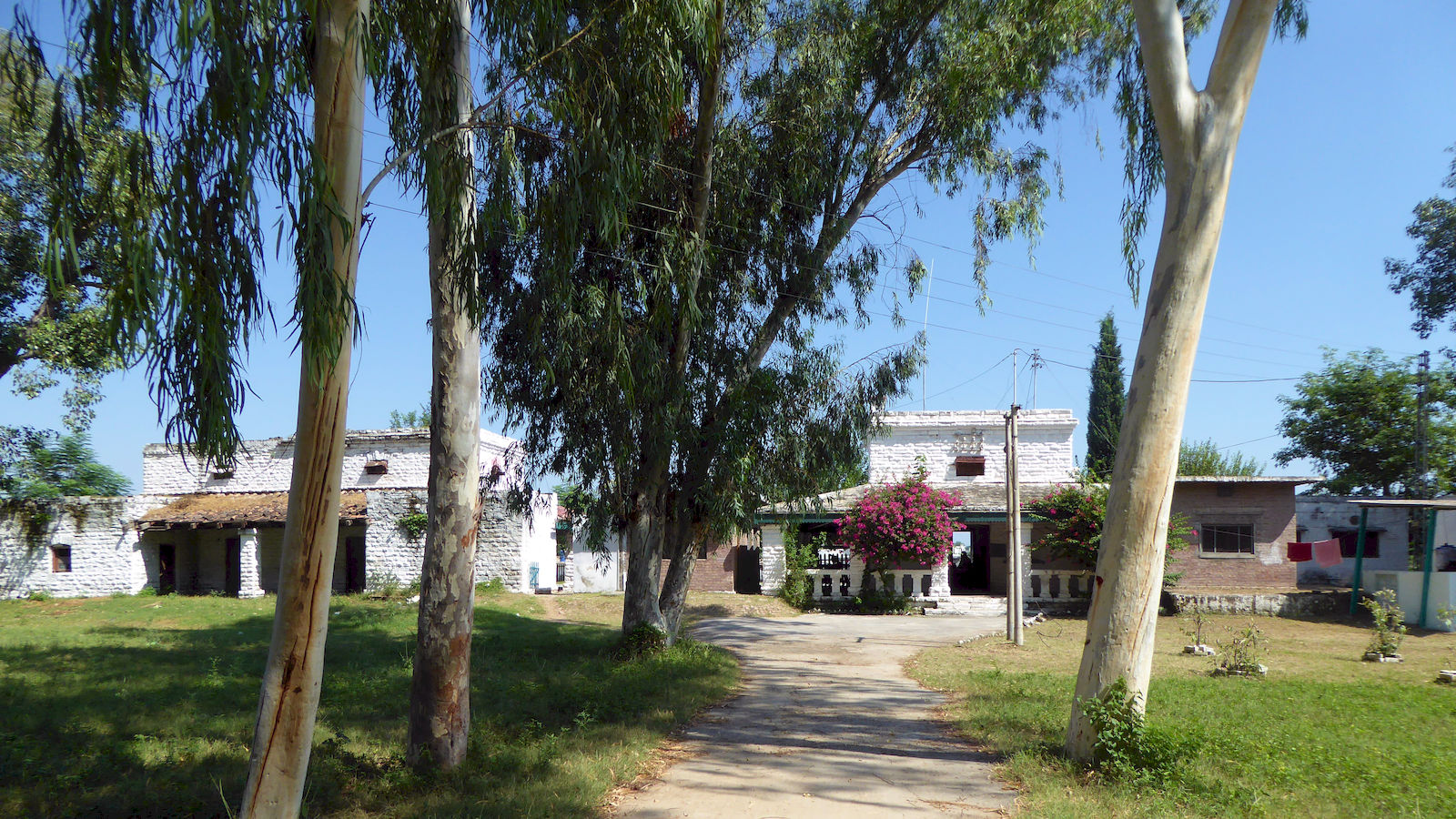
Sohawa railway station view from road

== See also ==
- List of railway stations in Pakistan
- Pakistan Railways
