= Bank engine =

Locomotive used to assist trains up steep inclines

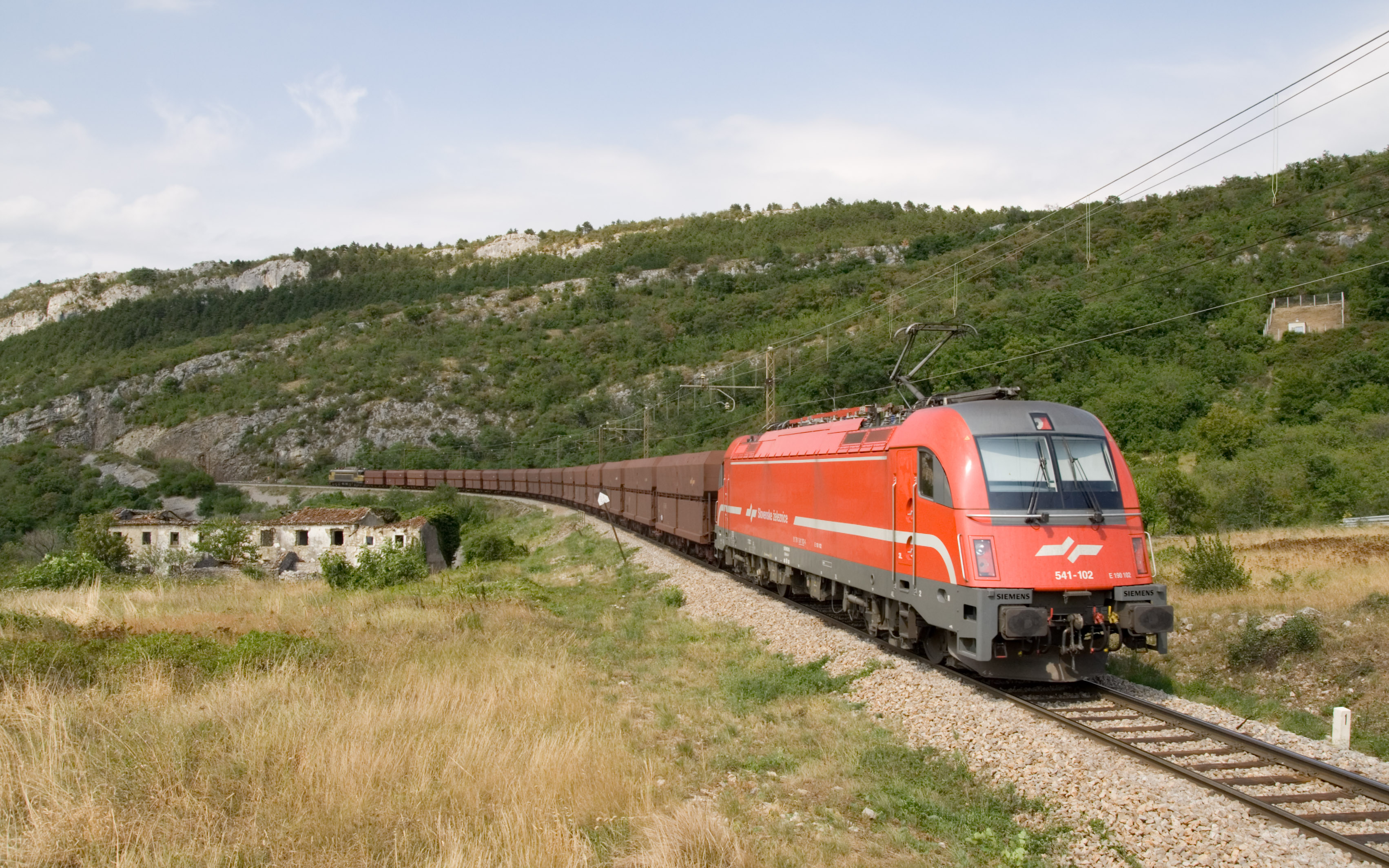
SZ Taurus pushing a freight train on the grade between Koper and Hrpelje-Kozina in Slovenia. An SZ class 363 is leading the train. July 2007.

A bank engine (United Kingdom/Australia) (colloquially a banker), banking engine, helper engine or pusher engine (North America) is a railway locomotive that temporarily assists a train that requires additional power or traction to climb a gradient (or bank). Helpers/bankers are most commonly found in mountain divisions (called "helper districts" in the United States), where the ruling grade may demand the use of substantially greater motive power than that required for other grades within the division.

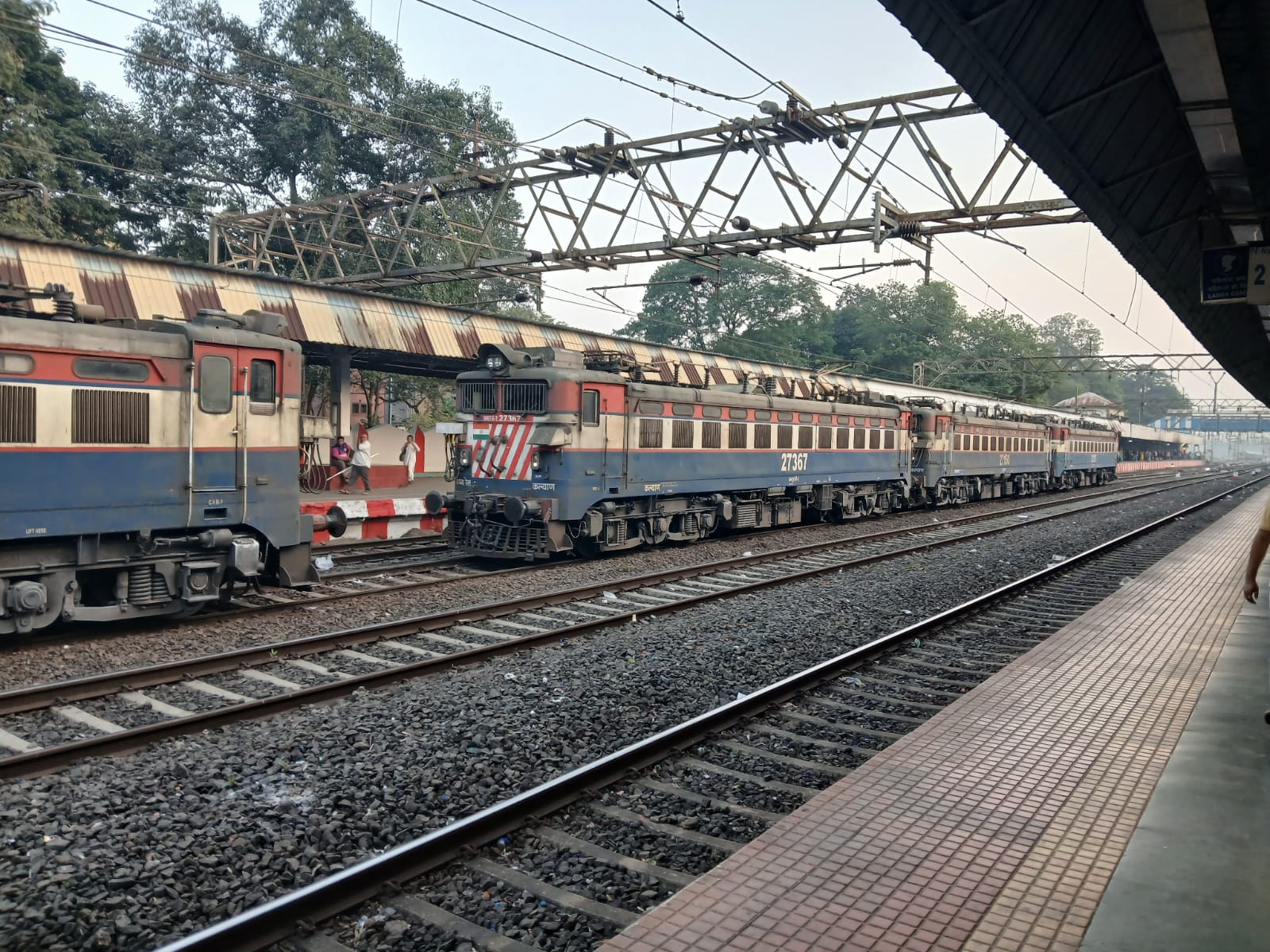
Kalyan Electric Loco Shed WAG-7, to be used as a banker locomotive for climbing the gradient on Bhor Ghat, near Pune. Spotted at Karjat Railway Station

== Historic practice ==
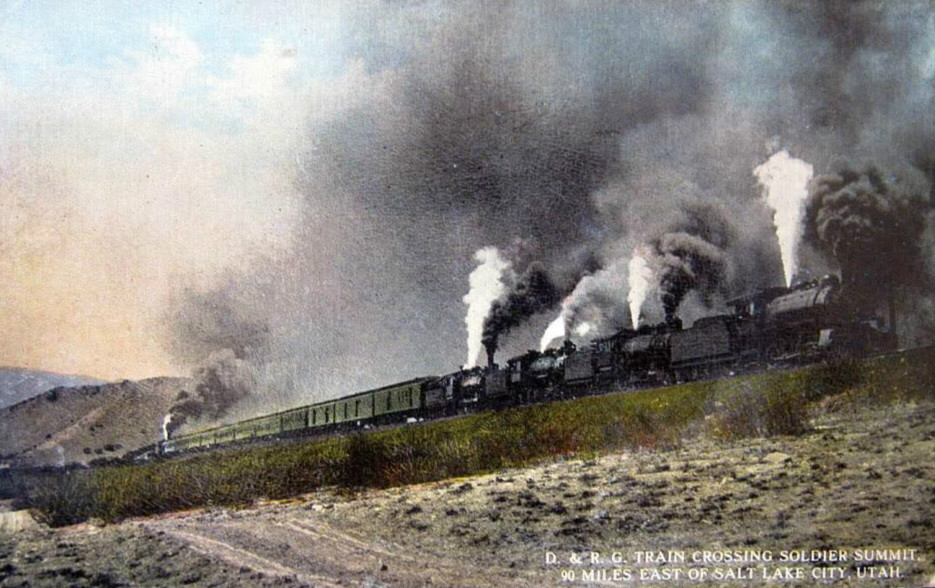
1915 photo of a quadruple header (four front locomotives) train with a rear helper, climbing the Denver & Rio Grande Western's grade up Soldier Summit

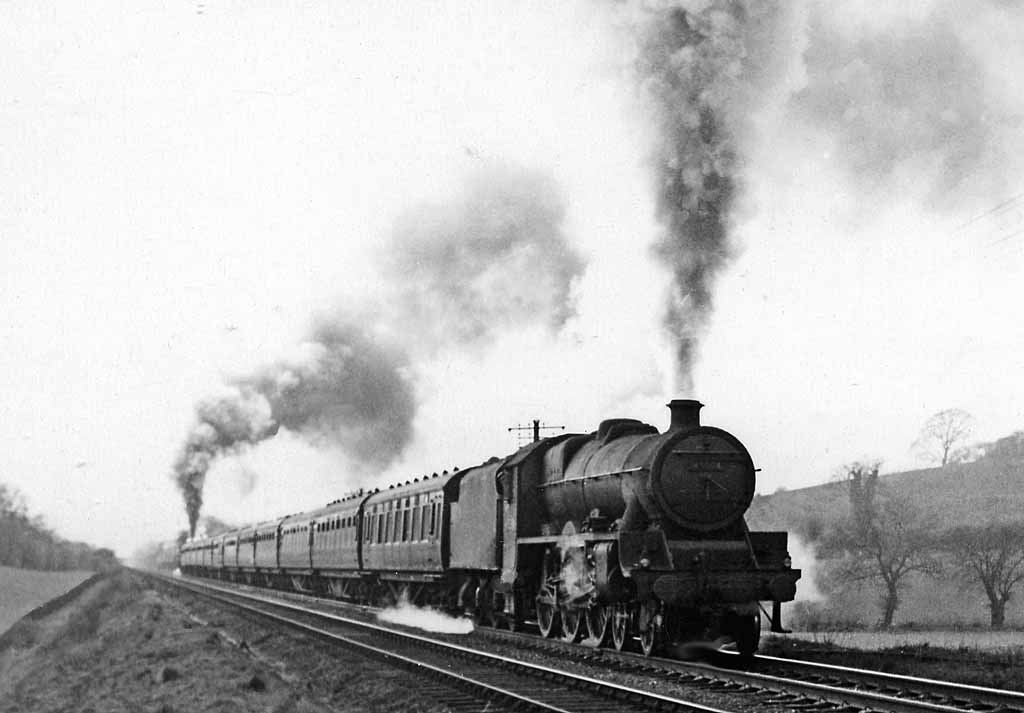
1949 photo of an LMS Jubilee Class climbing the Lickey Incline in Worcestershire with MR 0-10-0 Lickey Banker 'Big Bertha' providing banking at the rear of the train. In the present day, almost all trains can climb the incline unassisted, though heavier freight trains still require bankers.

Helpers/bankers were most widely used during the age of steam, especially in the American West, where significant grades are common and trains are long. The development of diesel-electric or electric locomotives has eliminated the everyday need for bankers/helpers in all but a few locations. With the advent of dynamic brakes on electric or diesel-electric locomotives, helpers/bankers can also be used to provide more braking force on long downhill gradients.

Bankers or helpers were historically positioned at the rear of the train, in which case they also protected against wagons or coaches breaking away from the train and running back downhill. Also, in a pusher role, it was possible for the helper/banker to easily separate once the train had crested the grade. Once separated, the banker would return to a siding or stub so as to clear the mainline and get ready for the next train. A common practice with knuckle couplers was to remove the knuckle from the front coupler. The locomotive would be brought up behind the last car of the train while the train was moving slowly. The air brake hose would not be coupled. When the train no longer required assistance, the helper/pusher would slow, then reverse and coast back down the grade to its siding at the bottom of the grade. This practice was outlawed in North America after the end of the steam era.

Special heavily constructed cabooses were sometimes used in helper areas. Ordinary cabooses were built as lightly as practical and might be crushed by the helper/pusher's force, which could be as much as 90 tons. The heavy cabooses allowed crews to avoid the time-consuming procedure of splitting the train just ahead of the caboose.

Pushers/helpers were commonly designed to provide extreme power for very short runs; as a result they could not push at full power for very far before steam pressure dropped. If it could push enough to get the train to the top of the grade, then it could build up pressure while coasting back down and while waiting for the next train to come along. This practice was common in Europe.

Since it was not possible to remotely control a steam locomotive, each helper had to have a full crew on board. Careful coordination was required between engine crews to assure that all locomotives were operated in a consistent manner. Standard whistle signals were employed to tell the helper crew when to apply power, drift or brake. A misunderstanding of signals by a pusher locomotive crew could result in a major wreck if the lead locomotive applied brakes while the bank engine was still applying power. The usual result was that the train would experience a violent run-in (an abrupt bunching of train slack), resulting in the derailment of part or all of the train.

The town of Helper, Utah, was named after these engines. It was where helper engines were kept to assist on the climb to Soldier Summit.

== Modern practice ==
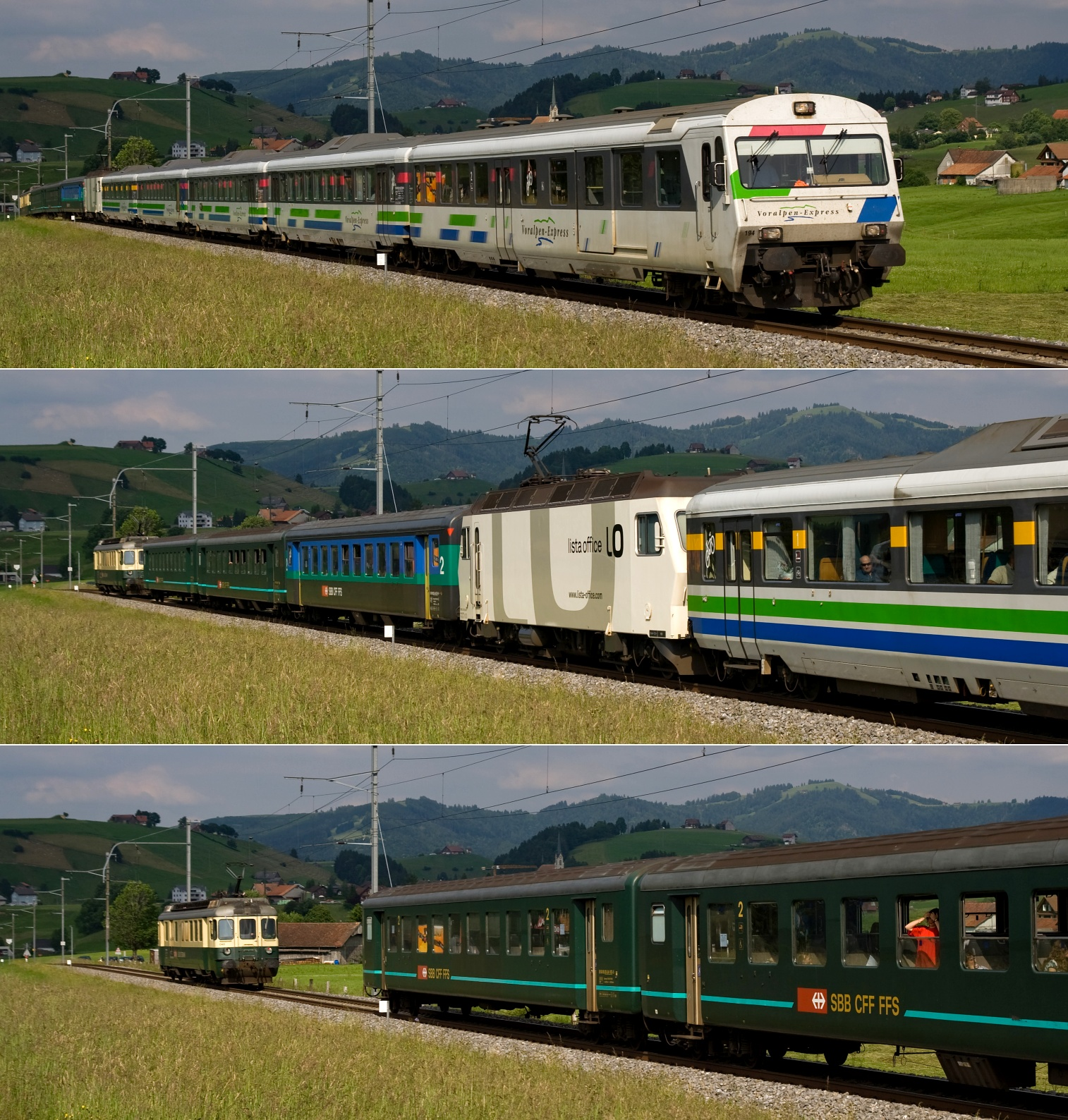
Uncoupled banking service: BDe 4/4 multiple unit separating from the Voralpenexpress after assisting on the 5 percent grade

Nowadays helpers/bankers are often controlled by coded radio signals from the locomotive at the head end of the train, allowing one engineer (driver) to simultaneously control the helper(s) and the train being helped. If radio operation is not possible, electrical control might be used, by way of cables running the length of the train (especially in case of passenger trains). Alternatively, radio communication with the lead engine's driver facilitates manual operation, which is still the norm for bank engines at the end of freight trains in Europe.

=== At the front ===
In the UK, an engine that was temporarily attached to the front of a train to assist with the ascent of an incline was called a pilot locomotive. This differentiated it from the train engine(s) that powered the train to its destination. A train with one or more locomotives attached to the front may be described as a "double header", "triple header", etc., depending on the number of helpers/bankers even when this lash-up of power was used for the entire run. These terms gradually fell out of general usage as diesel locomotives replaced steam power, and are not used for the common assemblage of several power units.

=== Mid-train ===
In countries where buffers-and-chain couplers are used, bank engines often cannot be added to the front of the train due to the limited strength of the couplers; In the case of standard UIC couplers and a maximum grade of 28‰ (which is common, e.g., for lines through the Alps), the limit is a train weight of 1400 tons; if a train is heavier, bank engines have to be added in the middle or to the end of the train in order not to exceed the maximum load for any coupler.

Adding locomotives in the middle of the train has the distinct advantage of applying the helper power to only part of the train, thus limiting the maximum drawbar pull applied to the first car of the train to a safe level. The narrow gauge portions of the Denver and Rio Grande Western Railroad, in particular, used "swing helpers", which meant the helper locomotives were placed mid-train at a point where they were pushing and pulling an approximately equal amount of tonnage, said location being referred to as the train's "swing point". This was also done to balance out the "slack" in the train between the locomotives, the swing helpers, and the end train helpers just in front of the caboose. However, this arrangement requires splitting the train in order to add or remove the helper engine(s), which can be a time-consuming maneuver. However, on some American railroads it was necessary to an extent, because operating rules required end of train helpers to be added at the end of the train, but in front of the caboose. This was done for the safety of the train crew riding inside the caboose.

=== End of the train ===
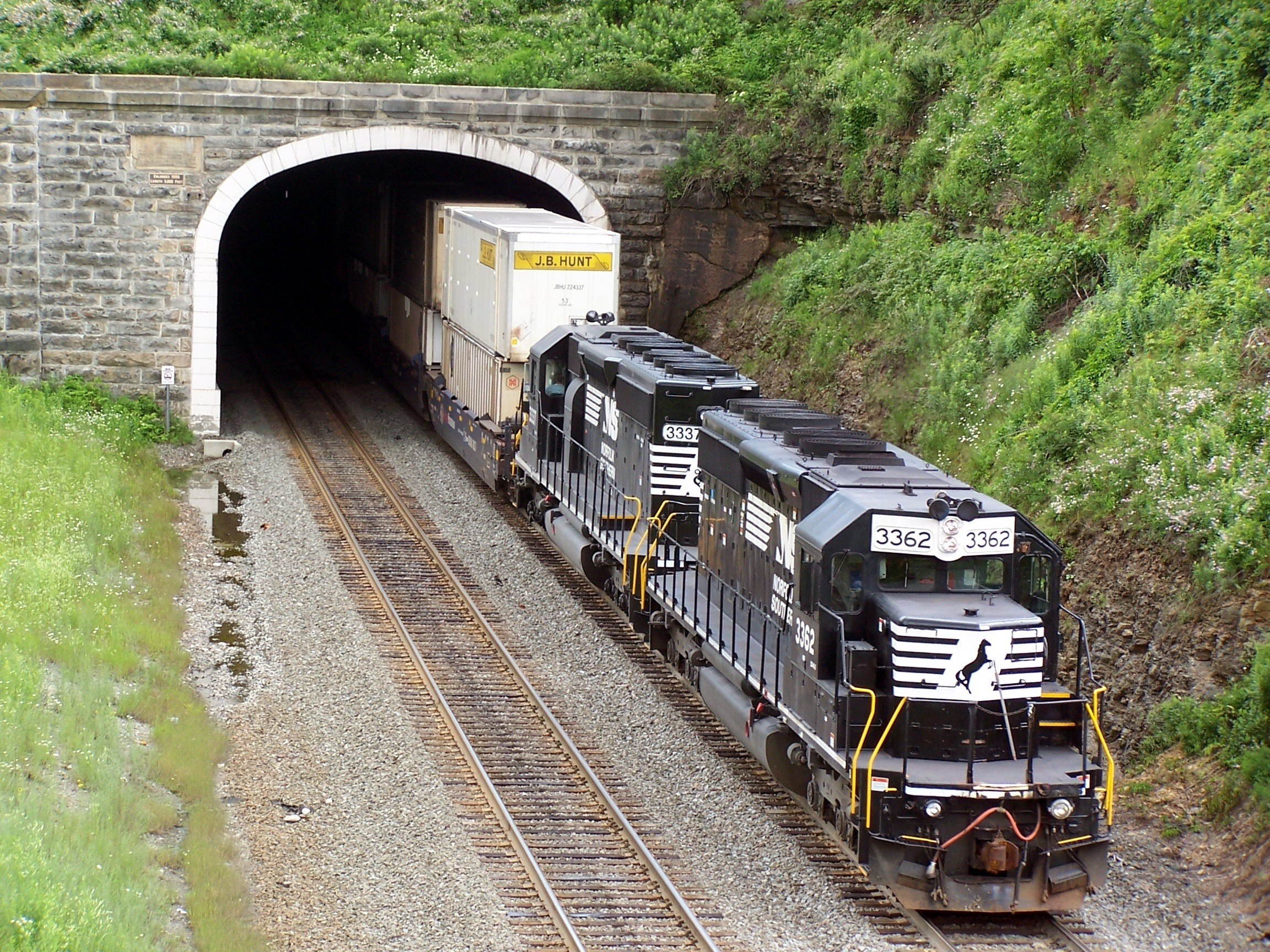
Helper locomotives on the rear of a Norfolk Southern intermodal train entering the Gallitzin Tunnel in Pennsylvania

To be able to add and remove helper locomotives quickly, which is especially important in Europe due to the high traffic density, they are usually added to the end of the train. Normally, they are coupled and the air hoses are connected, which is necessary for the air brake to work correctly e.g., in emergency situations, but in special cases trains are banked with uncoupled locomotives, which can be added or removed "in-flight." In the UK it was a usual practice for banking locomotives to follow and buffer-up to a slow-moving assisted freight train without coupling (as demonstrated in archive films of banking on the Lickey Incline) before applying more power, thus precluding the need for a standing start. Following an accident in 1969 this practice was discontinued. This procedure is not performed in North America, as it would violate Canadian and United States safety regulations.

== Accidents ==
- (United Kingdom) Chapel-en-le-Frith

== See also ==
- Distributed power
- Double-heading
- Station pilot
