= Tarki railway station =

Railway station in Punjab, Pakistan

Tarki Railway Station ترکی ریلوے اسٹیشن
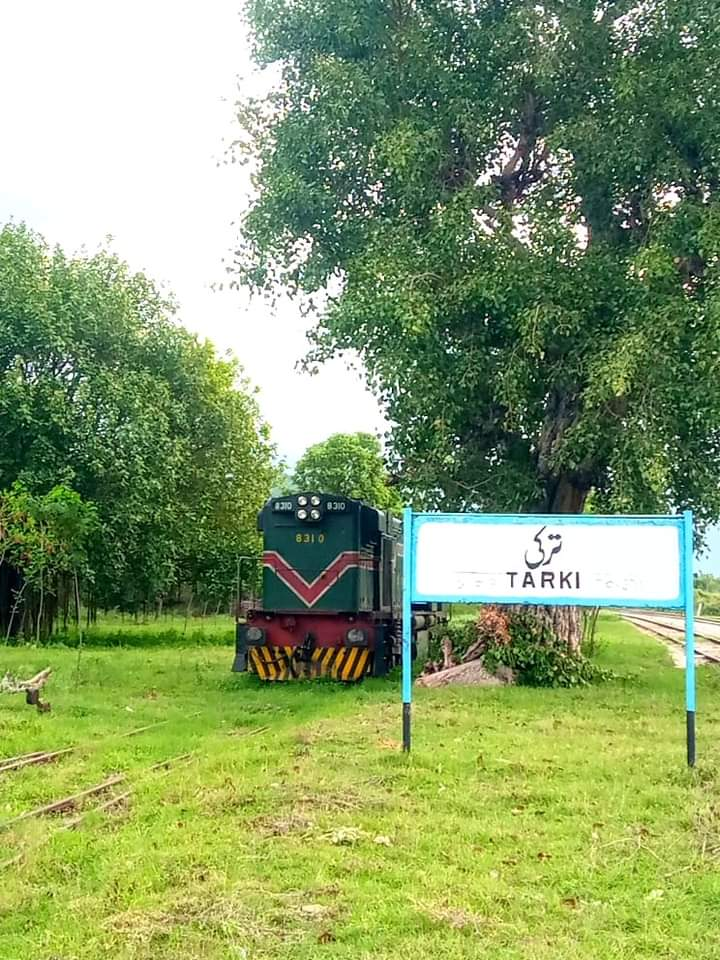

General information
- Coordinates: 33.0688°N 73.4266°E
- Owner: Ministry of Railways
- Line: Karachi–Peshawar Railway Line

Other information
- Station code: TRI

Services
| Preceding station | Pakistan Railways | Following station |
|---|---|---|
| Bakrala towards Kiamari | Karachi–Peshawar Line | Sohawa towards Peshawar Cantonment |
Location

Tarki Railway Station (Urdu and Punjabi: ترکی ریلوے اسٹیشن) is an abandoned railway station located in Tarki village, Jhelum district of Punjab province of the Pakistan.

== See also ==
- List of railway stations in Pakistan
- Pakistan Railways
