= List of reporting marks: W =

Note: Marks ending in U are for container owners; marks ending in X are not common carriers; marks ending in Z are for trailers without flanged wheels. All other marks are of common-carrier railroads.

== W ==
- WA - Western Railway of Alabama; Seaboard System Railroad; CSX Transportation
- WAB - Wabash Railroad; Norfolk Southern
- WACR - Washington County Railroad
- WACX - PCS Phosphate Company
- WAG - Wellsville, Addison and Galeton Railroad
- WAGX - PCS Phosphate Company
- WAL - Western Allegheny Railroad
- WAMX - Watco Transportation Services, L.L.C.
- WAR - Warrenton Railroad
- WAS - Waynesburg Southern
- WATC - Washington Terminal Company
- WATR - Waterville Railroad
- WAW - Conrail
- WBC - Wilkes-Barre Connecting Railroad
- WBCX - Williams Brothers Concrete
- WBMX - Wilkes-Barre Milling (Lauhoff Grain Company)
- WBTS - Waco, Beaumont, Trinity and Sabine Railway
- WC - Wisconsin Central Railway; Canadian National Railway
- WCCL - Wisconsin Central Railway; Canadian National Railway
- WCDX - Far-Mar-Co, Inc.
- WCE - West Coast Express
- WCHX - Walter Haffner Company
- WCRC - Washington Central Railroad
- WCRX - United Grain Corporation
- WCTR - WCTU Railway
- WCTX - West Central Cooperative
- WDRR - White Deer and Reading Railroad
- WDTX - Washington State Department of Transportation
- WE - Wheeling and Lake Erie Railway (current)
- WECX - Westinghouse Electric Corporation
- WEIX - Wilbur-Ellis Company
- WELX - Welland Chemical, Inc.
- WERR - Washington Eastern Railroad
- WEPX - Wisconsin Electric Power Company
- WERZ - Werner Enterprises
- WESX - BC Timber, Ltd.
- WFAX - Western Fuels Association, Inc.
- WFCX - Western Farmers Electric Cooperative
- WFE - Western Fruit Express; Burlington Northern Railroad
- WFIX - WFIX Partners; Wells Fargo Rail
- WFRX - WFEC Railroad Company; Wells Fargo Rail
- WGBX - W. G. Block Company
- WGCR - Wiregrass Central Railroad
- WGRR - Williams and Grand Ronde Railroad
- WHCX - Western Hay Corporation
- WHI - Burlington Northern Railroad
- WHN - Conrail
- WHSX - GE Rail Services
- WICT - Wisconsin and Calumet Railroad
- WIF - West India Fruit and Steamship Company
- WIGX - Wigeon Car Company
- WISX - Wisconsin Power and Light
- WITX - Continental Carbon Company
- WIWR - Wisconsin Western Railroad
- WKRL - Western Kentucky Railway
- WLE - Wheeling and Lake Erie Railway (former)
- WLFB - Wolfeboro Railroad
- WLO - Waterloo Railway
- WLPX - West Lake Polymers
- WLRL - Washington-Lincoln Railink
- WM - Western Maryland Railroad; Baltimore and Ohio Railroad; Chessie System; CSX Transportation
- WMI - West Michigan Railroad
- WMSC - White Mountain Scenic Railroad
- WMSR - Western Maryland Scenic Railroad
- WMTZ - Wal-Mart Transportation
- WMWN - Weatherford, Mineral Wells and Northwestern Railway
- WN - Wisconsin Northern Railroad
- WNF - Winfield Railroad
- WNFR - Winnifrede Railroad
- WNGX - Western Natural Gas Company
- WNYP - Western New York and Pennsylvania Railroad
- WOD - Washington and Old Dominion Railroad
- WOPR - West Oakland Pacific Railroad
- WP - Western Pacific Railroad; Union Pacific Railroad
- WPGX - Western Paving Construction Company
- WPLX - GE Rail Services
- WPMW - Western Pacific Railroad (Maintenance of way)
- WPRR - Willamette and Pacific Railroad
- WPSX - Wisconsin Public Service Corporation
- WPY - White Pass and Yukon Route
- WRA - Western Railway of Alabama; Seaboard System Railroad; CSX Transportation
- WRDX - Iowa-Illinois Gas and Electric Company
- WREX - Western Refrigerator Express
- WRIX - Western Rail Inc.
- WRL - Western Refrigerator Line, Washington Royal Line
- WRLX - Relco Tank Line
- WRNX - Gulf Oil Products Company; Chevron USA, Inc.
- WRPX - Public Service Company of Indiana
- WRRC - Western Rail Road Company
- WRSX - Scholle Corporation
- WRTX - Western Rail Leasing Corporation
- WRWK - Providence and Worcester Railroad
- WRX - Western Refrigerator Line Company
- WS - Ware Shoals Railroad
- WSCX - Buffalo Brake Beam Company
- WSJR - Goderich-Exeter Railway
- WSOR - Wisconsin and Southern Railroad
- WSOX - Wisconsin and Southern Leasing Company
- WSR - Warren and Saline River Railroad
- WSRC - West Shore Railroad Corporation
- WSS - Winston-Salem Southbound Railway
- WSX - National Steel Corporation (Weirton Steel Division)
- WSYP - White Sulphur Springs and Yellowstone Park Railway
- WT - Weldwood Transportation, Ltd., Wyandotte Terminal Railroad
- WTA - Wichita Terminal Association
- WTCO - Watco Railways
- WTCX - Weyerhaeuser Company
- WTOH - Western Ohio Railroad
- WTRY - Wilmington Terminal Railroad
- WTSE - West Shore Railroad Corporation
- WTTX - Trailer Train Company
- WURR - Wallowa Union Railroad
- WUT - Wichita Union Terminal Railway
- WUTX - Washington Utilities and Transportation Commission (scale test cars)
- WVCX - Westvaco Corporation
- WVN - West Virginia Northern Railroad
- WVRR - Whitewater Valley Railroad
- WW - Winchester and Western Railroad
- WWR - Washington Western, Western Washington Railroad
- WWRC - Wilmington & Western Railroad
- WWLX - LaRoche Industries, Inc.
- WWPX - Willimantic Waste Paper, Inc.
- WWSX - Standard Car Truck Company
- WWUX - Unimin
- WYCX - Weyerhauser Canada, Ltd.
- WYS - Wyandotte Southern Railroad
