= WRX =

WRX, or wrx, is a three-letter abbreviation that may refer to:

- FIA World Rallycross Championship
- GB-WRX, the ISO 3166-2:GB code for Wrexham (county borough) in Wales, UK
- Subaru Impreza WRX (World Rally eXperimental) (1992–2014)
- Subaru WRX (World Rally eXperimental) (2014–present)
- Western Refrigerator Line (from its reporting mark)
- wrx, the ISO 639-3 code for the Wae Rana language of Flores, Indonesia
- WRX, the National Rail code for Wrexham General railway station in Wales, UK

See also
