= Gateway Subdivision =

Railway line in Oregon and California

The Gateway Subdivision is a railroad line owned by the BNSF Railway. It runs from Klamath Falls, Oregon in the north to Keddie, California at the south end.

== History ==
The earliest traces of railroad activity on the Gateway Subdivision traces to two major (now fallen flag) railroads, the Great Northern Railway (U.S.) and the Western Pacific Railroad. Historically, the Great Northern laid track from Klamath Falls, Oregon to Bieber, California and the Western Pacific laid track from the famed Keddie Wye near Keddie, California to Bieber (Actual town is known as Nubieber, today. Bieber is the RR name for the location). In March 1931, both railroads met in the town of Bieber. Within no time, trains began to travel the newly completed railroad line. The railroads offered interchange service, where Great Northern trains handed over their trains to the Western Pacific and the Western Pacific transferred their trains to the Great Northern.

This trend, continued until 1970, when the Great Northern Railway merged with the Northern Pacific Railway, Chicago, Burlington and Quincy Railroad and the Spokane, Portland and Seattle Railway to form the Burlington Northern Railroad. Western Pacific operations however, remained until 1983 when the Union Pacific Railroad took over the Western Pacific and it became under the control of the Burlington Northern and the Union Pacific Railroads. In the 1990s, the Burlington Northern Railroad merged with the Atchison, Topeka and Santa Fe Railway to form the BNSF Railway. Currently, the trackage is wholly owned by the Burlington Northern Santa Fe Railway.

== Traffic ==
Traffic on the Gateway Subdivision consists of general merchandise freights and empty well car trains—as many as three of the latter each day. As of October 2011, there is one local freight that runs out of Klamath Falls twice weekly—south to Clear Creek Jct. or Crescent Mills on Monday and north to Klamath Falls on Tuesday, and south on Thursday and back north on Friday. Amtrak's Seattle–Los Angeles Coast Starlight stops at Klamath Falls, but there is no passenger service on the Gateway Subdivision itself.
