= Green Bay and Western Railroad =

Railroad in Wisconsin, USA

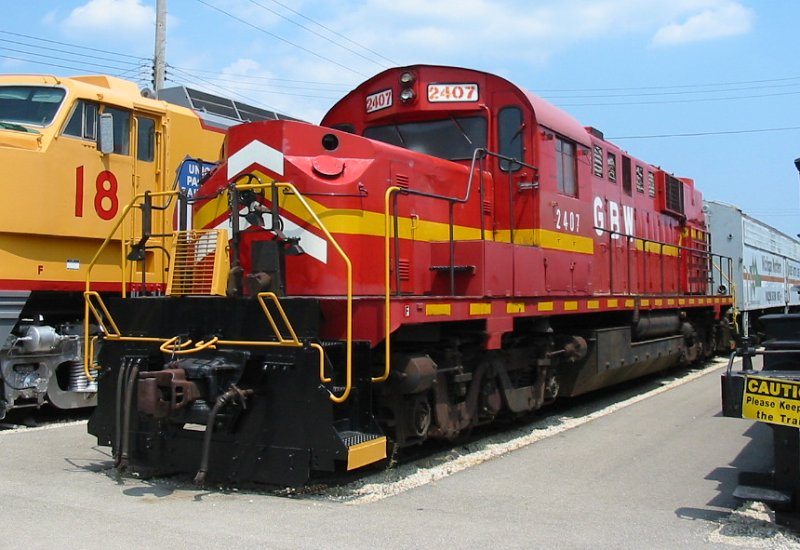
- Ex-LS&I #2407 at the Illinois Railway Museum

Overview
- Headquarters: Green Bay, Wisconsin
- Reporting mark: GBW
- Locale: Wisconsin
- Dates of operation: 1896–1993
- Successor: Wisconsin Central Ltd.

Technical
- Track gauge: 4 ft 8 1/2 in (1,435 mm) standard gauge

The Green Bay and Western Railroad (reporting mark GBW), also known as the Green Bay Route, served central Wisconsin in the United States from 1896 until it was absorbed into the Wisconsin Central in 1993. At the end of 1970 it operated 322 miles of track on 255 miles of road; that year it reported 317 million ton-miles of revenue freight.

== History ==
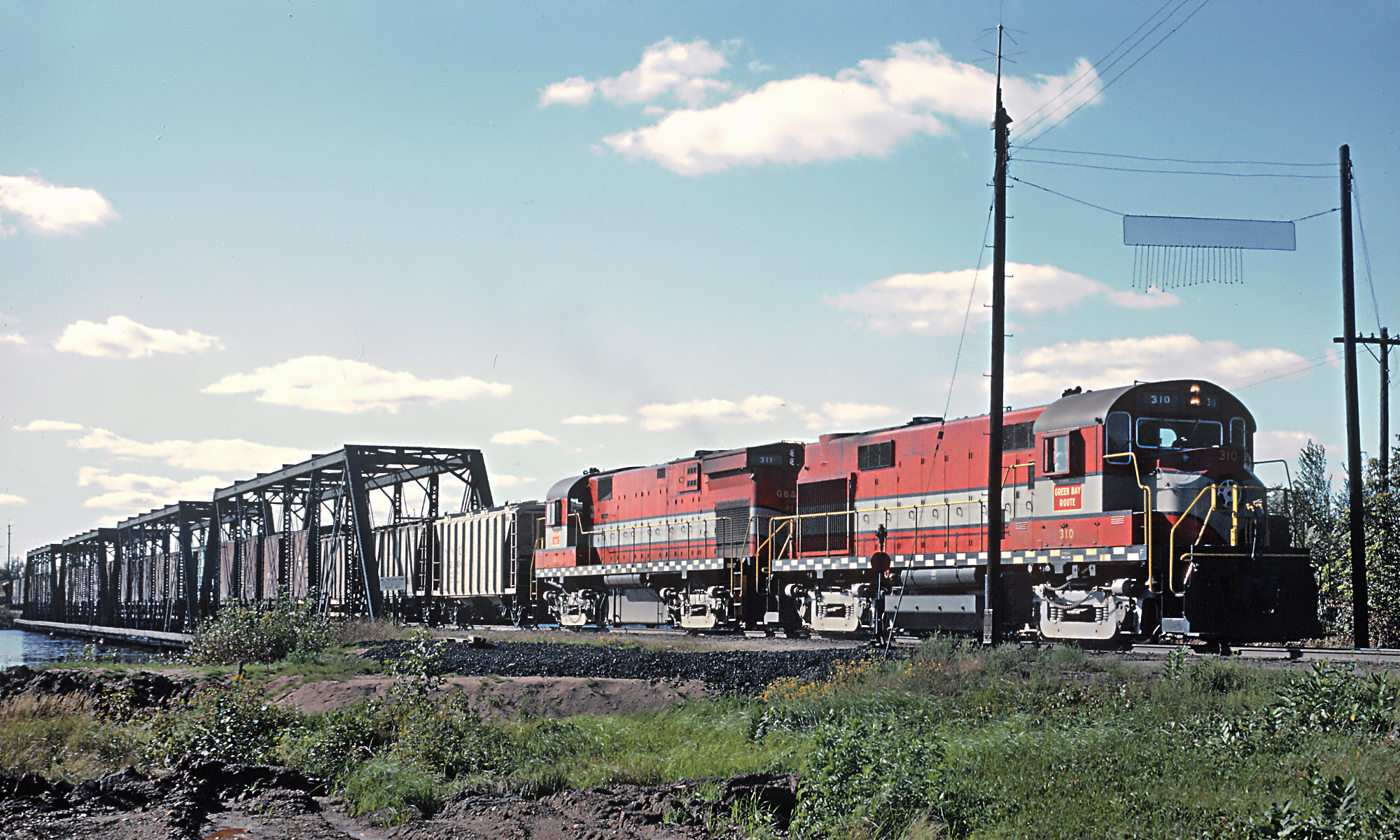
A Green Bay and Western Railroad train, 1964

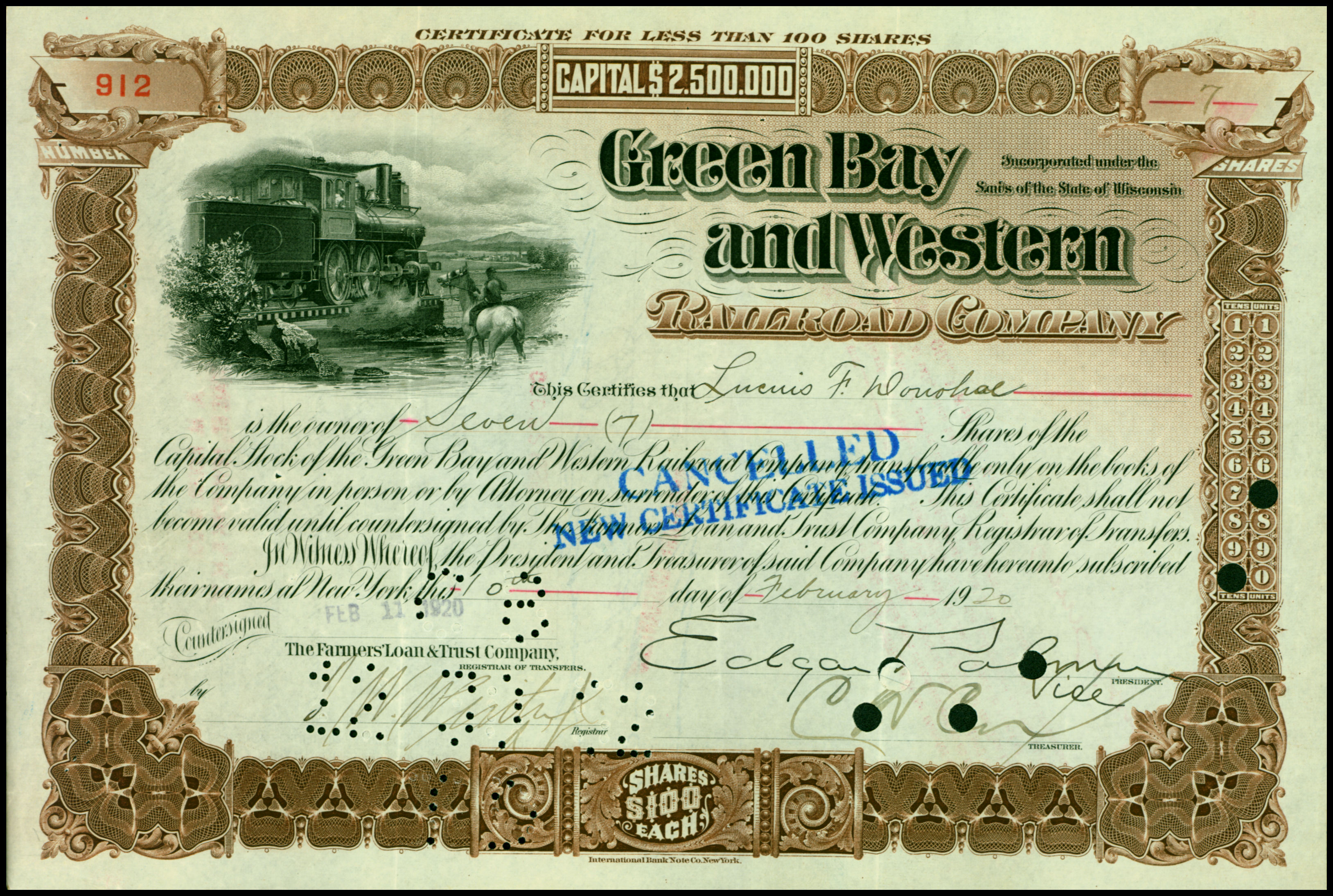
Share of the Green Bay and Western Railroad Company, issued 10. February 1920

The Green Bay and Western Railroad was formed in 1896 from the bankruptcy proceedings of the Green Bay, Winona & St Paul and the Kewaunee, Green Bay and Western. The existing route, originally built by the Green Bay and Lake Pepin Railroad, linking Green Bay, Wisconsin, and East Winona, Wisconsin, formed the bulk of the new railroad. The Green Bay and Western acquired on August 1, 1906, a majority of shares/interest in the Ahnapee and Western Railway. The GBW established in 1929 the Western Refrigerator Line Company (WRX) to operate a 500-car fleet of reefers. Passenger traffic ceased in April 1949. The Line had carried 50,000 passengers yearly in the 1870s, 310,000 in 1915 but only 1,000 in 1947 having reverted to mixed trains. The Green Bay and Western sold off the Ahnapee and Western Railway to Vernon M. Bushman and a group of private investors on May 31, 1947. The Itel Corporation purchased the Green Bay & Western in 1978. The Green Bay & Western and the Fox River Valley Railroad were merged into a new Wisconsin Central subsidiary, the Fox Valley and Western Railroad August 27, 1993. Wisconsin Central was, in turn, purchased by Canadian National railway in 2001.

== Main line ==
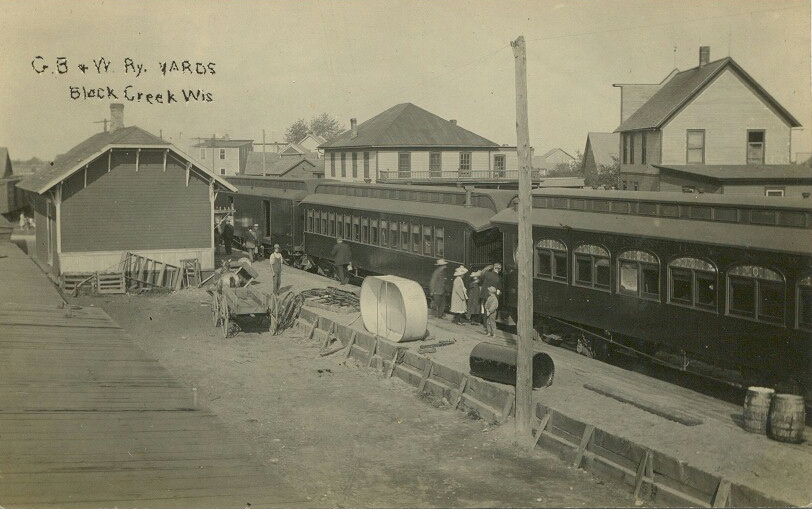
Green Bay & Western Railway yards in Black Creek.

- Kewaunee - Casco Junction - Green Bay. Opened - November 1891. 2015 Status - Open from Green Bay - Luxemburg. Points past that are part of the Ahnapee State Trail.
- Green Bay - New London. Opened - November 1871. 2015 Status - Open to industrial spurs in west Green Bay to MP 4. Otherwise abandoned. Most of the abandoned segment are currently trails.
- New London - Wisconsin Rapids. Opened - January 1873. 2015 Status - Open New London (MP 39) - Northport (MP 41.75) and Plover - Wisconsin Rapids. Northport - Manawa is currently out of service. Otherwise abandoned.
- Wisconsin Rapids - Merrillan. Opened - January 1873. 2021 Status - Open.
- Merrillan - Arcadia. Opened December 1873. 2021 Status - Open.
- Arcadia - East Winona. Opened 1883. 2021 Status - O/O/S.
- East Winona - Winona. Opened 1891. The GBW operated over this section as one-third owner of the Winona Bridge Railway Company. One third was originally Chicago Great Western, another third was owned by the Chicago, Burlington and Quincy Railroad. Status 2015 Abandoned. The bridge was closed to traffic in 1984. It was damaged by fire in 1989 and dismantled in 1990.

== Branch lines ==
- Casco Junction - Algoma - Sturgeon Bay, see Ahnapee and Western Railway.
- Iola (Iola Northern Railroad), opened 1893 from Scandinavia, operated by the GBW and purchased by them in 1914, abandoned October 1956. Note: The proposed extension to Prentice to connect with the Soo Line was never constructed.
- Waupaca (Waupaca Green Bay Railway), opened 1907 from Scandinavia, purchased by GBW in 1922, closed 1947 (passenger traffic ceased some years previously). The Waupaca Line was promoted by local business interests to provide competition to the Wisconsin Central. The Waupaca Depot was unusual in that it was the former Evangelical Lutheran church.
- Biron Branch, opened sometime between 1881 and 1896 from Wisconsin Rapids, open as of 2021. Although only 2.2 miles (3.5 km) long from Wisconsin Rapids, it proved valuable as connection to paper industries.
- Stevens Point (Stevens Point and Northern), opened January 1882 from Plover, purchased by GBW in May 1896, open as of 2021.
- La Crosse Branch (La Crosse to Onalaska), 6.38 miles (10.27 km), opened 1876, abandoned 1922. Connected to main line via trackage rights over the C&NW from Marshland.

== Lake Michigan ferry connections ==
The GBW prospered from 1892 when a train ferry was introduced across Lake Michigan from Kewaunee eliminating transhipment and bypassing the congested Chicago area. Ferries ran to Frankfort, Michigan, operated by the Ann Arbor Railroad and Ludington, Michigan, operated by the Chesapeake & Ohio.

Frankfort services ended around 1980 and those to Ludington in 1990.

== See also ==
- Western Refrigerator Line
- Ahnapee and Western Railway
- Kewaunee, Green Bay and Western Railroad
