= Ahnapee and Western Railway =

Shortline railroad in Wisconsin, U.S.

Ahnapee and Western Railway logo.

The Ahnapee and Western Railway (A&W) was a common carrier shortline railroad located in northeastern Wisconsin.

The railroad ran 34.5 miles (55.5 km) from a connection with the Kewaunee, Green Bay and Western Railroad at Casco Junction to the lakeshore terminals of Algoma in Kewaunee County and Sturgeon Bay in the "Door County thumb" of Wisconsin. Other towns along the line include Casco, Rio Creek, Forestville, Maplewood, and Sawyer. The name of the railroad comes from the city of Ahnapee, which was founded along the Ahnapee River and became Algoma in 1899.

== History ==
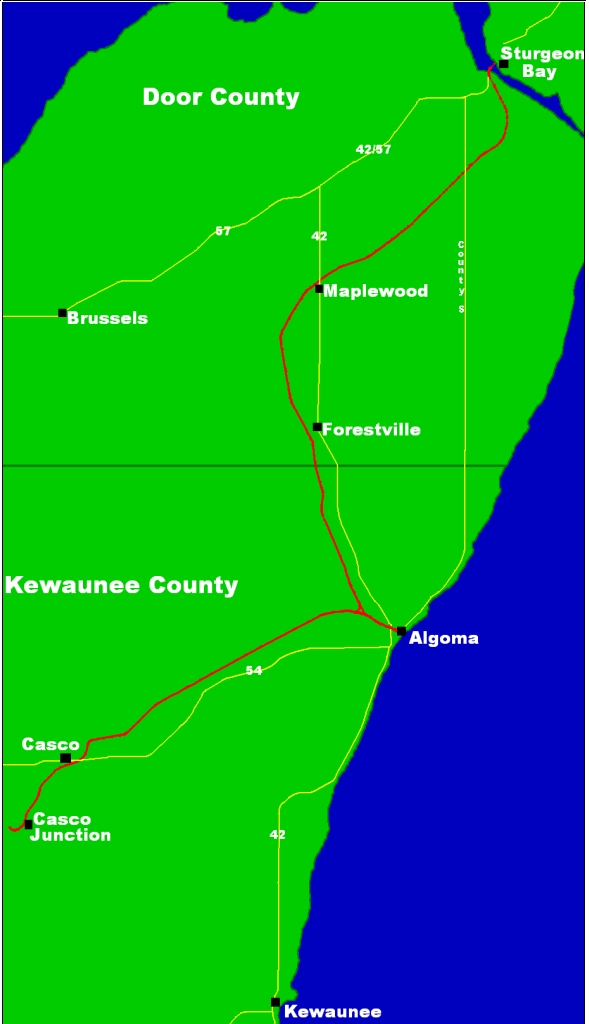
Route of Ahnapee and Western Railway/Ahnapee trail.

The A&W was incorporated on August 18, 1890, and was built from Casco Junction to Algoma in 1892 and extended to Sturgeon Bay in 1894. The railroad owned a total of 4 4-4-0 American type locomotives during these times. It was financed by Edward Decker, a prominent businessman in the area, to dovetail with his logging, publishing, and other commercial interests centered at Casco. Decker sold the company on August 1, 1906, to the Green Bay and Western Railroad (GB&W). The A&W became a division of the GB&W and the physical plant of the line was substantially upgraded in the period around World War I. In 1915 the GB&W replaced the four 4-4-0s with two 2-6-0 moguls. Through the Depression years the railroad saw a decrease in traffic and the GB&W looked to sell the line during World War II despite short-term increases in carload traffic due to wartime production of naval vessels and of wood products at industries along the route. The A&W also transported German prisoners of war to Door County to work the fruit harvest season during the war years.

The A&W was sold by the GB&W to local interests on May 31, 1947. Vernon Bushman of Green Bay, Wisconsin, purchased the railroad and, along with his brother Erv, operated the road whose carloadings were dependent on the local shipbuilding, plywood, evaporated milk, lumber, and petroleum products-related industries. In 1949, the A&W bought GB&W 398, but later traded it for GB&W 351. In 1955, travel time between Sturgeon Bay to Chicago was one night for express service and two nights for regular service. Regular service over two nights also connected Sturgeon Bay to the Twin Cities and Detroit.

Upon the condemnation of the swing bridge across the Sturgeon Bay Ship Canal in 1968, the railroad embargoed the entire north end (Sturgeon Bay to Algoma) on August 8, 1968. The south half of the railroad was sold to United States Plywood/Champion Papers in December 1970 to ensure rail service to the Algoma Plywood & Veneer mill (a USP subsidiary). The GB&W was contracted to operate train service over the line in September 1972, with the last independent A&W train running on September 15, 1972. The GB&W operated the railroad as a branchline a few days per week, and Trans-Northern operated weekend special excursion trains until a bridge pier was damaged by flooding at the Kewaunee River. This forced the entire line to be embargoed. Sources state that the last train to operate on the railroad ran on March 25, 1986.

The company was officially acquired by Wisconsin Central Transportation's subsidiary Fox Valley and Western in its August 27, 1993, purchase of the Itel-owned lines of the Green Bay & Western, Fox River Valley, and Ahnapee & Western Railroads. However, the line had already been declared "no longer a Common Carrier" on October 25, 1990. The Railroad Retirement Board determined that the railroad ceased to be a carrier employer effective November 19, 1993, following the sale to WC/FV&W.

== Ahnapee State Trail ==
The railroad right of way has been turned into a hiking, biking, horse riding, and snowmobile trail called the Ahnapee State Trail, traveling from the railway's original connection with the former GB&W tracks at Casco Junction to Sturgeon Bay. It is open year around and gives users a remarkably scenic view of the Wisconsin countryside. Many artifacts of the A&W's history remain along the trail including steam locomotive boiler culverts, dated concrete bridges, several steel girder bridges, and many of the buildings that once housed rail-related industries.

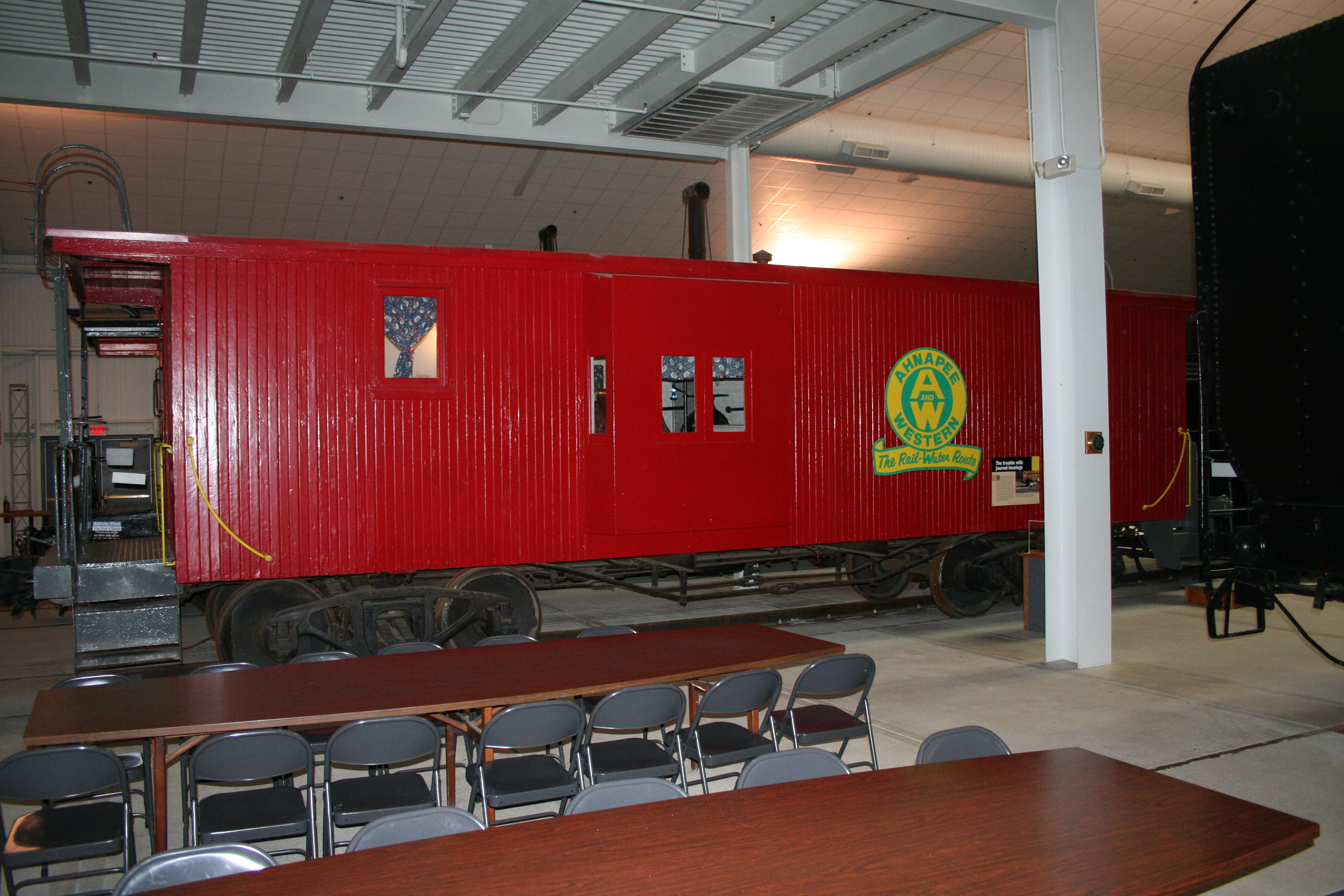
Ahnapee and Western caboose, on display

== National Railroad Museum ==
The Ahnapee & Western № 33 caboose is on display indoors at the National Railroad Museum in Green Bay.

== Gallery ==
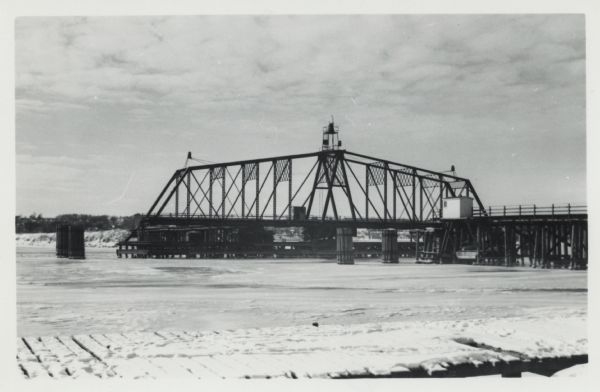
Bridge over the canal at Sturgeon Bay, March 18, 1920

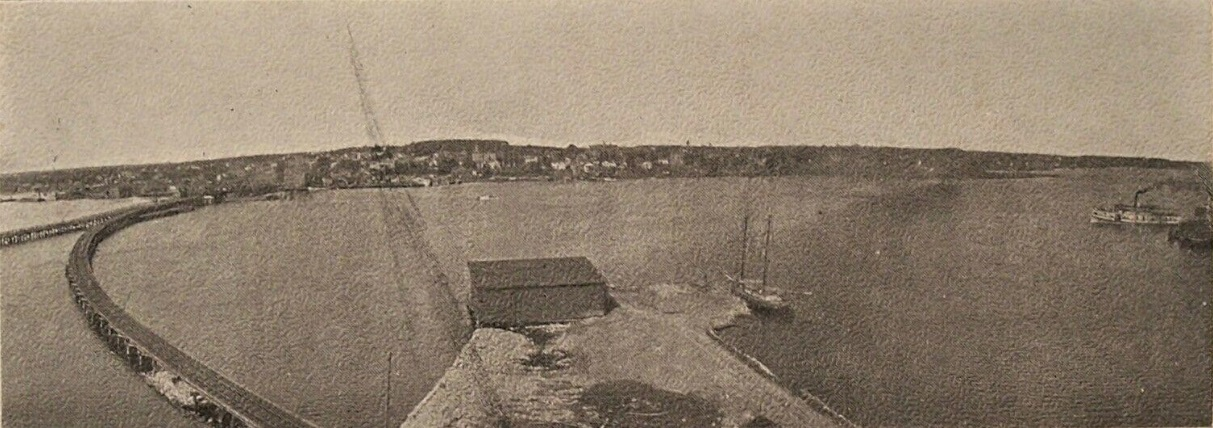
View of the curved railroad bridge at Sturgeon Bay; from a postcard published in 1907 or earlier

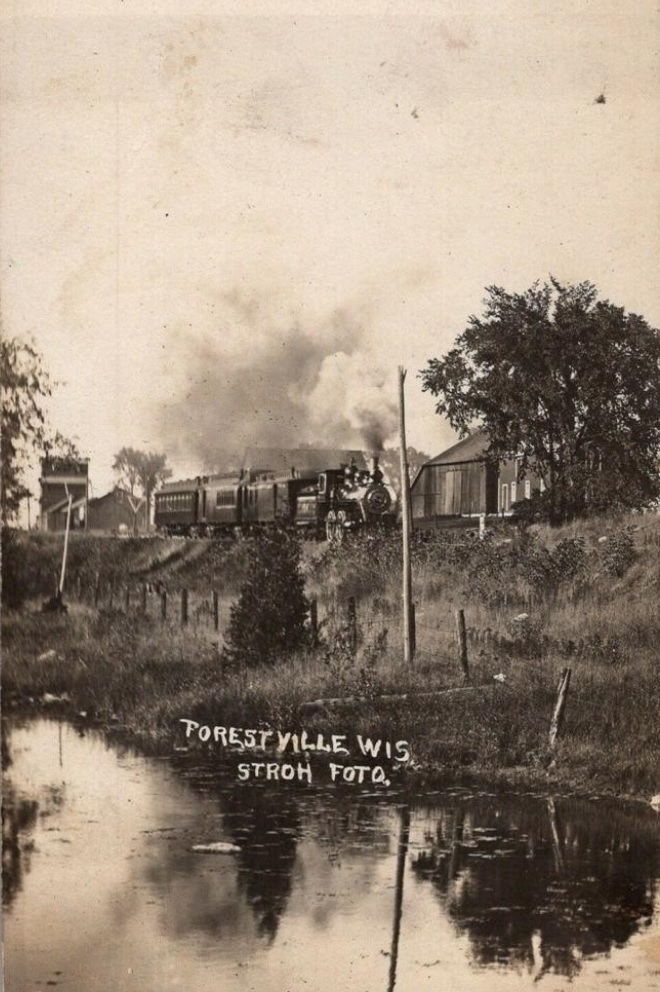
Passing through Forestville; from a postcard postmarked in 1909

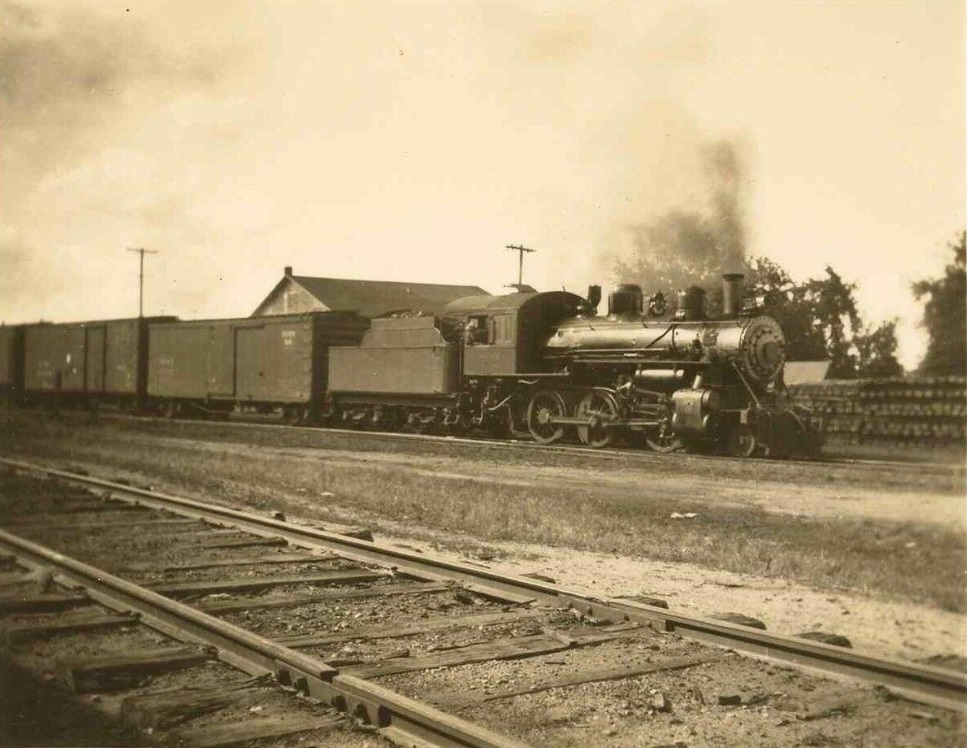
Engine № 72 at Sturgeon Bay; from postcard of unknown date

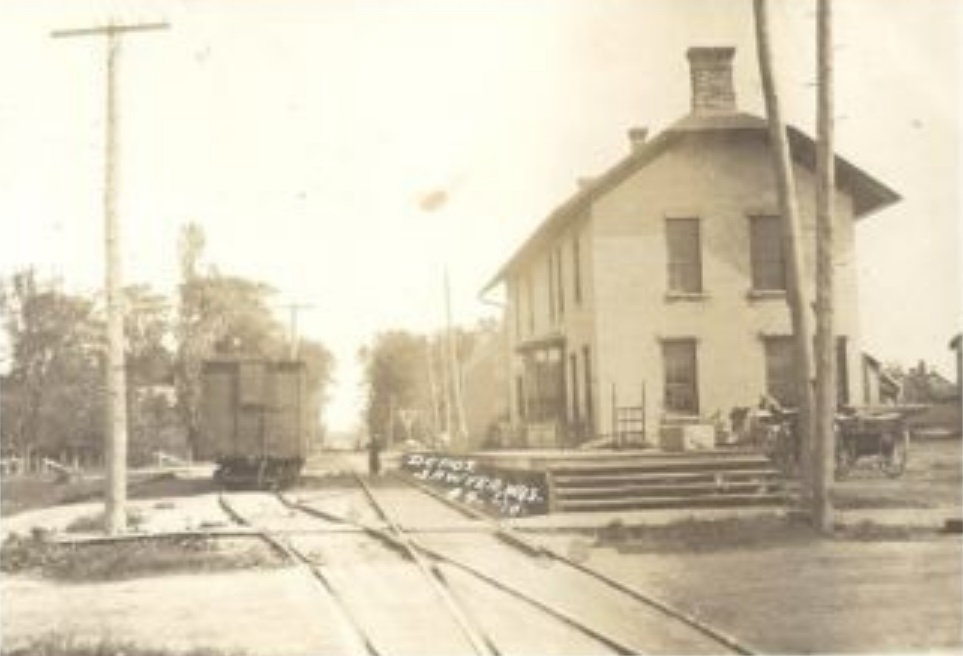
At Sawyer (which later merged with Sturgeon Bay); from a postcard postmarked in 1910

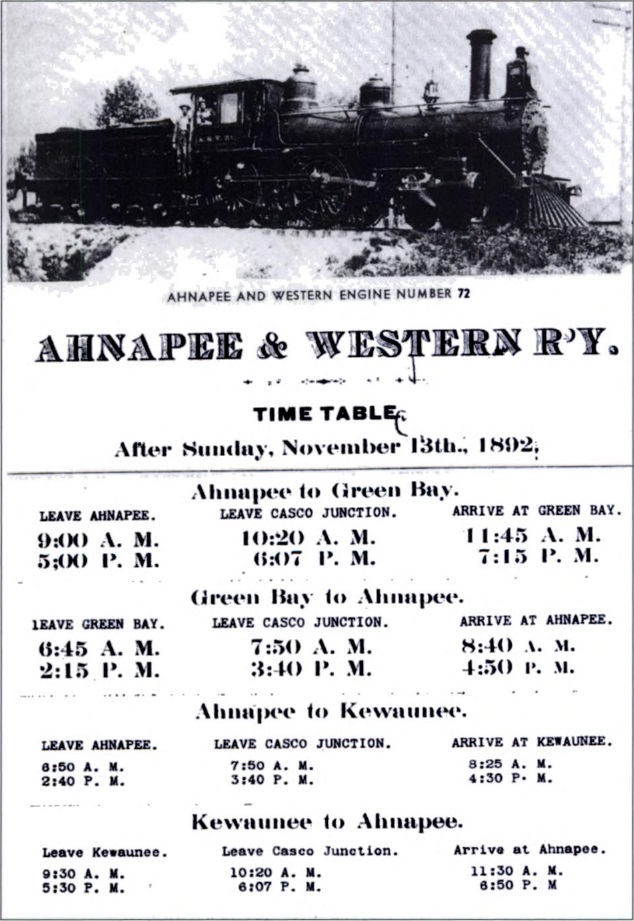
1892 time table

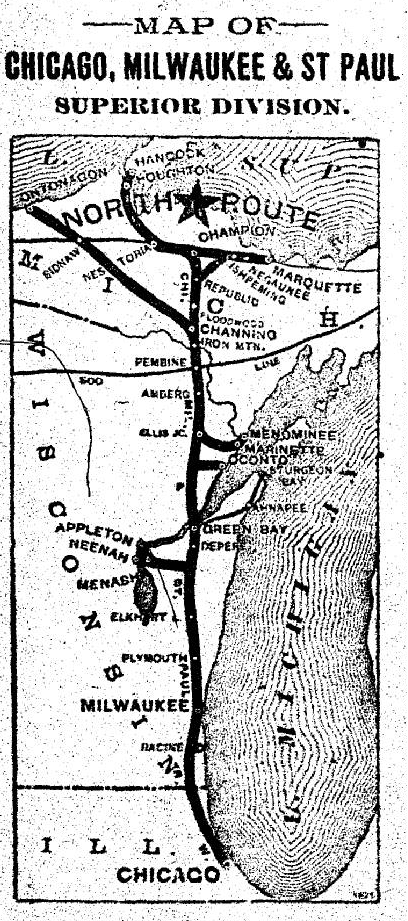
1899 route map

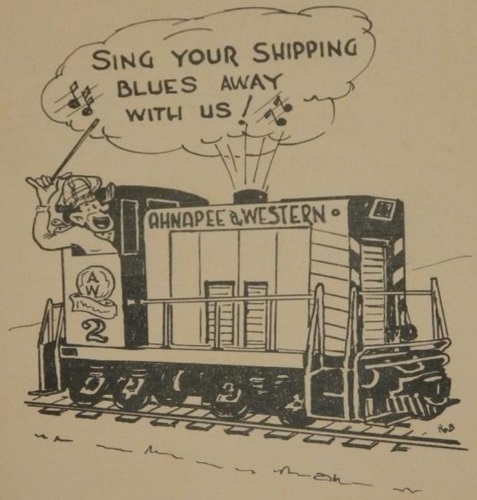
Cartoon advertisement in the Sing Brother, Sing! Sing booklet published by the Ahnapee and Western Railway

== See also ==
- Green Bay and Western Railroad
