= Keddie Wye =

Railroad Junction

Coordinates: 40°01′06″N 120°57′27″W

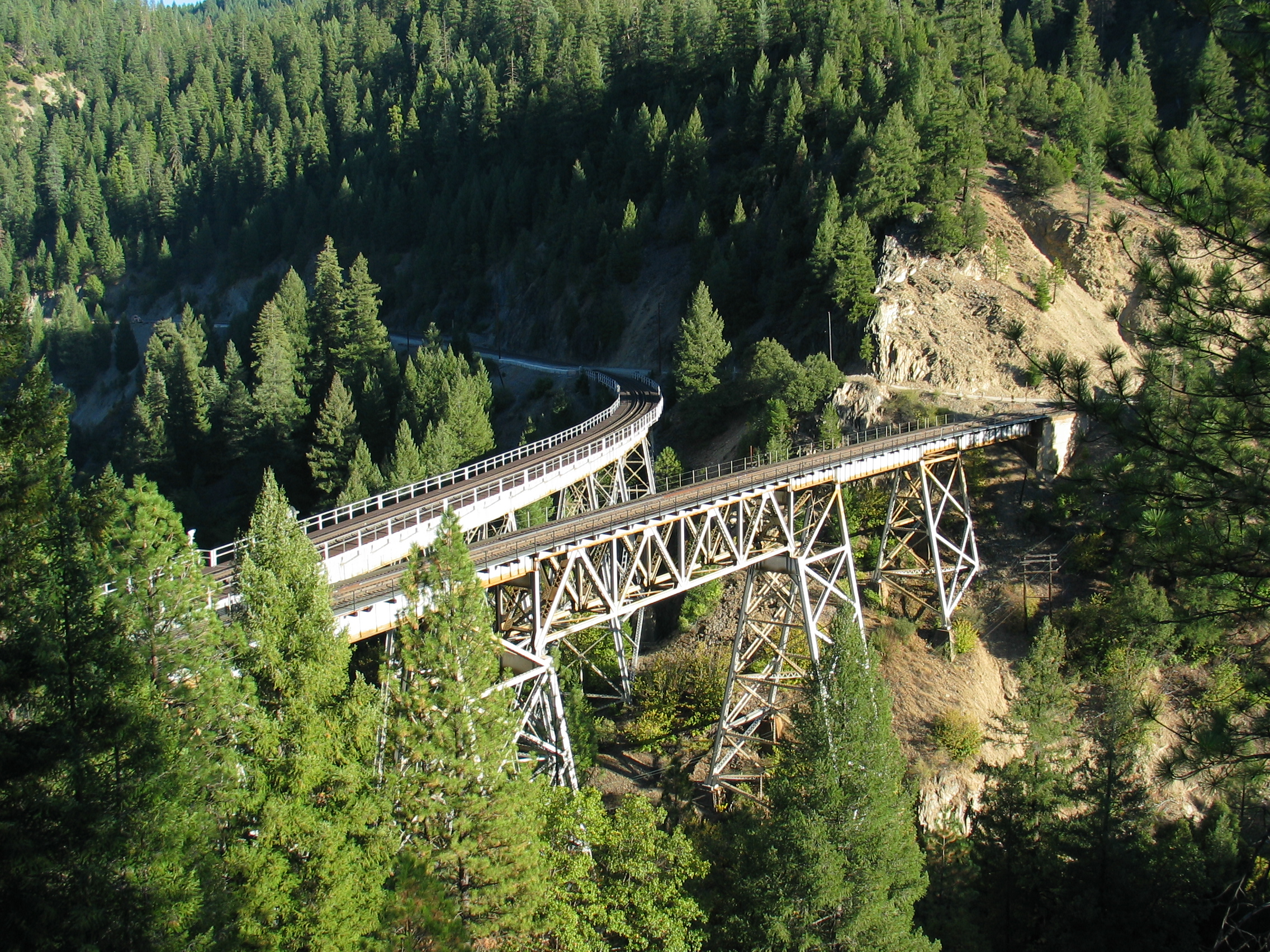
Keddie Wye as seen in 2003

The Keddie Wye is a railroad junction in the form of a wye on the Union Pacific Railroad in Plumas County, California, United States. Located at the town of Keddie, it joins the east-west Feather River Route and the "Inside Gateway"—formally, the BNSF Gateway Subdivision—which runs north to Bieber.

A notable feat of railroad engineering, it is the world's only wye with two legs on bridges that meet in a tunnel. The west and north legs of the wye are on bridges over Spanish Creek, and the southeast leg runs through a tunnel (Tunnel No. 32). Just to the northwest, where the two bridged legs join, is Tunnel No. 31.

The wye and the town are named for Arthur W. Keddie, who purchased the survey rights and the right to build a railroad through the Feather River Canyon from George Jay Gould, the son of Jay Gould.

== History ==
The Western Pacific Railroad (now part of the Union Pacific) built the tracks along the Feather River in 1909 to complete a route from the San Francisco Bay Area to Salt Lake City, Utah, providing an alternate to the Southern Pacific's route over Donner Pass. Keddie was the site of the "last spike" ceremony held on November 1, 1909.

The Feather River route was preferred by some over the Donner Pass route through the Sierra Nevada because the high point of the former (the Chilcoot Tunnel under Beckwourth Pass) is at a lower elevation — about 5,000 ft (1,500 m) as opposed to 7,000 ft (2,100 m) — and most of the route is at a gentler grade than the line over Donner Pass.

Construction started on the branch running north to Bieber in 1930 and was completed in 1931, along with the north and southeast legs of the wye. This allowed the Western Pacific to diverge from its east-west route (along the west leg of the wye) and go north to an interchange with the Great Northern Railway (now BNSF Railway) and its traffic from the Pacific Northwest.

== Railfanning ==
The Keddie Wye is a favorite railfan spot and is part of Plumas County's 7 Wonders of the Railroad World. Access to the site is described in the county travel guide.

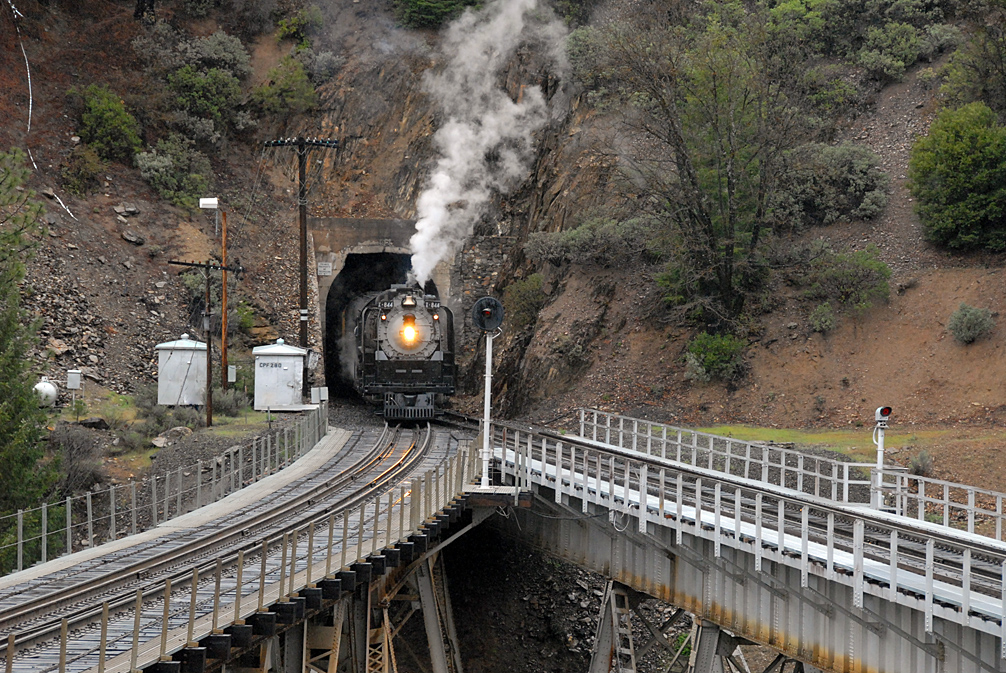
UP 844 emerges from Tunnel 31 (May 2009)

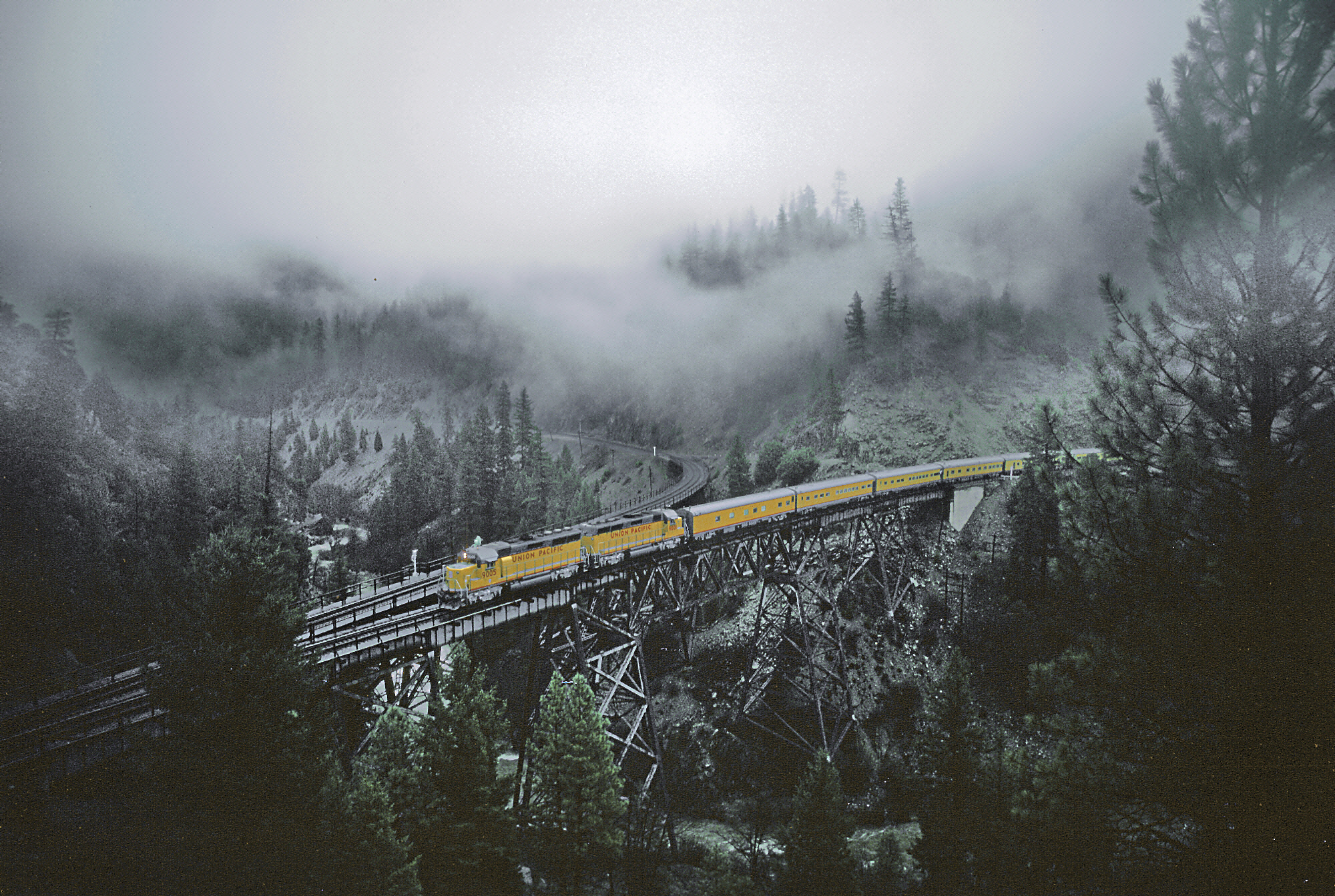
UP Officers Special (Feb 1983)

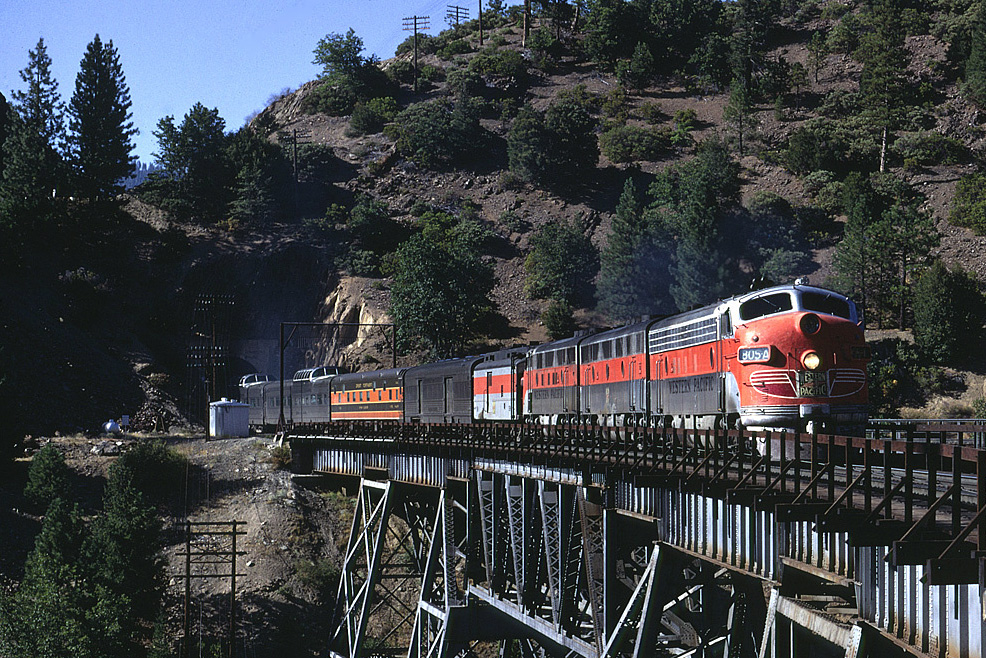
WP California Zephyr at Keddie Wye (Aug 1969)

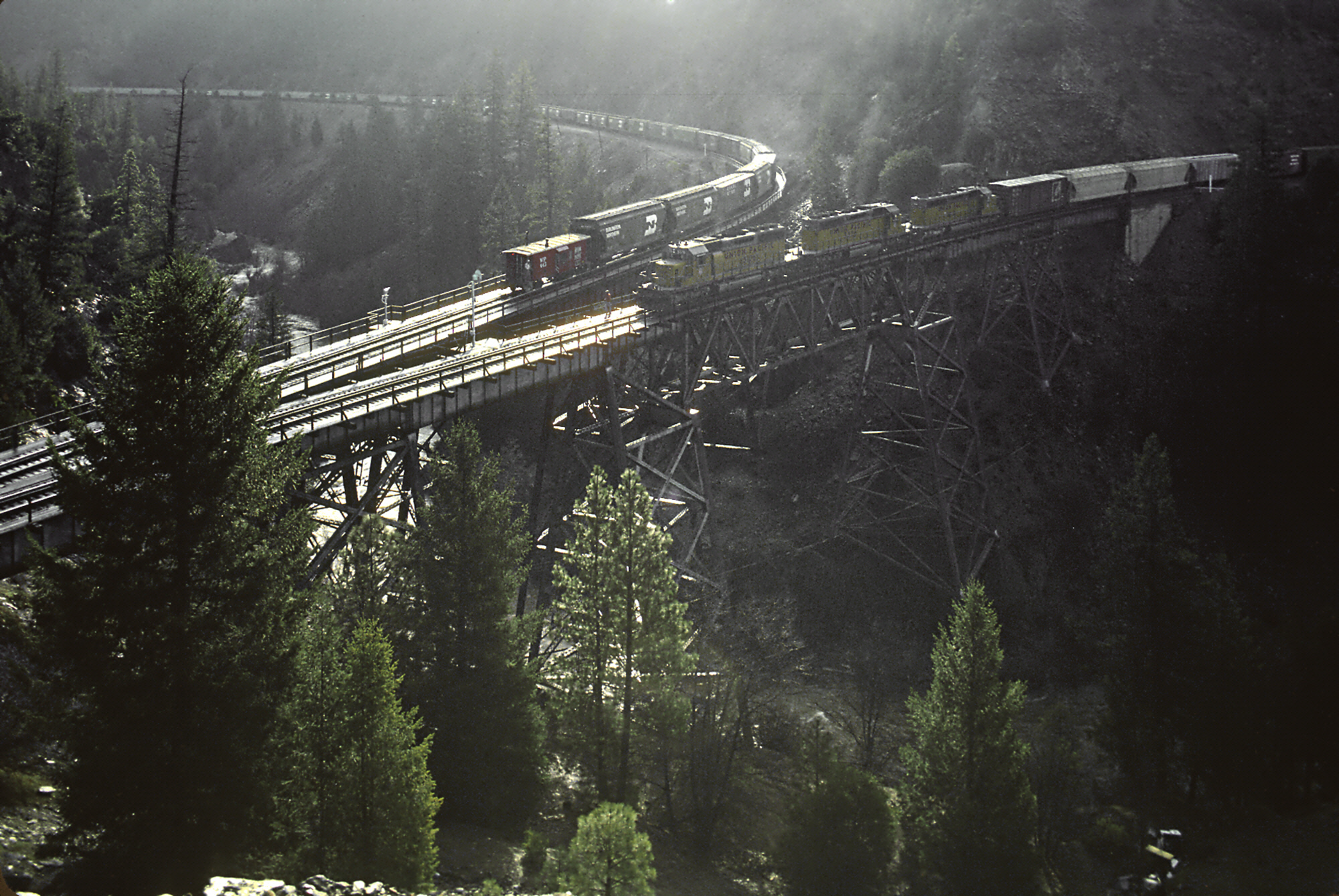
Westbound train waits for northbound train to clear Tunnel 31 (Mar 1983)
