= Keddie murders =

Unsolved 1981 American quadruple homicide

- Victims, clockwise: Sue Sharp, John Sharp, Dana Wingate, and Tina Sharp
- Date: April 11–12, 1981
- Location: 28 Keddie Resort Road, Keddie, California, U.S.; 40.0160°N 120.9625°W
- Type: Quadruple murder
- Deaths: Glenna Susan Sharp; John Sharp; Dana Wingate; Tina Sharp
- Suspects: Martin Smartt (died 2000); John Boubede (died 1988)

The Keddie murders are an unsolved quadruple homicide that occurred over the night of April 11–12, 1981, in Keddie, California, United States. The victims were Glenna Susan "Sue" Sharp (née Davis; born March 29, 1945), daughter Tina Louise Sharp (born July 22, 1968), son John Steven Sharp (born November 16, 1965) and John's friend Dana Hall Wingate (born February 8, 1964).

The murders took place in house No. 28 of the Keddie Resort. The bodies of Wingate, Sue and John Sharp were found on the morning of April 12 by Sue's 14-year-old daughter Sheila, who had been sleeping at a friend's house. Sue's two younger sons, Rick and Greg, as well as their friend Justin Smartt, were also in the house but were unharmed. Tina was missing from the scene.

Tina remained a missing person until April 1984, when her skull and several other bones were recovered at Camp 18, California, near Feather Falls in Butte County, about 62 miles (100 km) from Keddie. Multiple leads and suspects were examined in the intervening years, but no charges were filed. Several new leads were announced in the 21st century, including the discovery of a hammer in a pond in 2016 and the discovery of new DNA evidence.

== Timeline ==
=== Background ===
In July 1979, Glenna Susan "Sue" Sharp (née Davis; born March 29, 1945, in Springfield, Massachusetts), along with her five children, left her home in Connecticut after separating from her husband, James Sharp. They relocated to northern California, where Sue's brother Don lived. Upon arriving in California, she rented a small trailer formerly occupied by her brother at the Claremont Trailer Village in Quincy. The following fall, she moved to house #28 in the rural Sierra Nevada railroad town of Keddie. The house was much larger than the trailer and had become available when Plumas County's sheriff Sylvester Douglas Thomas vacated the property. She resided there with her 15-year-old son John (born November 16, 1965), 14-year-old daughter Sheila, 12-year-old daughter Tina (born July 22, 1968) and two younger sons, Rick (age 10) and Greg (age 5).

On April 11, 1981, at around 11:30 a.m., Sue, Sheila and Greg drove from the residence of their friends, the Meeks family, to retrieve Rick, who was attending baseball tryouts at Gansner Field in Quincy. They happened upon John and his friend Dana Hall Wingate (born February 8, 1964) hitchhiking at the mouth of the canyon from Quincy to Keddie and then drove them about 6 miles (9.7 km) away to Keddie. Two hours later, at around 3:30 p.m., John and Dana hitchhiked back to Quincy, where they may have had plans to visit friends. Around this time, the boys were seen in the city's downtown area.

That same evening, Sheila had plans to spend the night with the Seabolt family, who lived in adjacent #27, while Sue remained at home with Rick, Greg and the boys' young friend Justin Smartt. Sheila departed house #28 shortly after 8:00 p.m. to sleep at the Seabolts'. Tina, who had been watching television at the Seabolt residence, returned to #28 after asking what time it was at 9:30.

=== Murders and discovery ===
At approximately 10:00 a.m. on the morning of April 12, Sheila returned to #28 and discovered the dead bodies of Sue, John and Dana in the house's living room. All three had been bound with medical tape and electrical cords. Tina was absent from the home, while the three younger children—Rick, Greg, and Justin—were found physically unharmed in an adjacent bedroom. Upon discovering the scene, Sheila rushed back to the Seabolts' house, and Jamie Seabolt retrieved Rick, Greg and Justin through the bedroom window. He later admitted to having briefly entered the home through the back door to see if anyone was still alive, potentially contaminating evidence in the process.

The murders of Sue, John and Dana were especially vicious: two bloodied knives and one hammer were found at the scene. Blood-spatter evidence from inside the house indicated that the murders had all taken place in the living room.

Sue was discovered lying on her side near the living room sofa, nude from the waist down and gagged with a blue bandana and her own underwear, which had been secured with tape. She had been stabbed in the chest and her throat was stabbed horizontally, the wound passing through her larynx and nicking her spine, and on the side of her head was an imprint matching the butt of a Daisy 880 Powerline BB/pellet rifle. John's throat was slashed. Dana had multiple head injuries and had been manually strangled to death. John and Dana suffered blunt-force trauma to their heads caused by one or more hammers. Autopsies determined that Sue and John died from the knife wounds and blunt-force trauma, and Dana died by asphyxiation.

=== Initial investigation ===
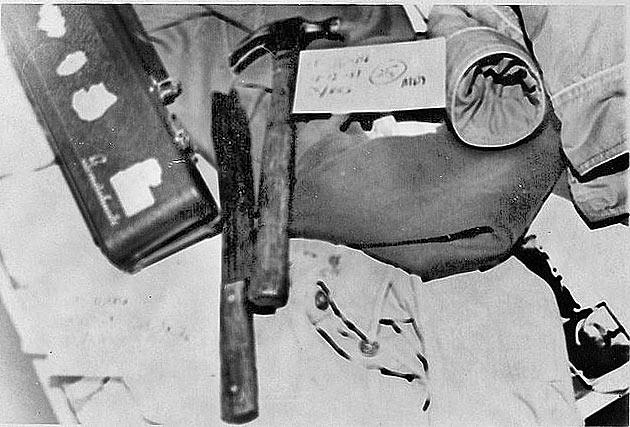
Hammer and knife found at the scene, with Sheila's flute case intentionally posed by the killers atop the knife

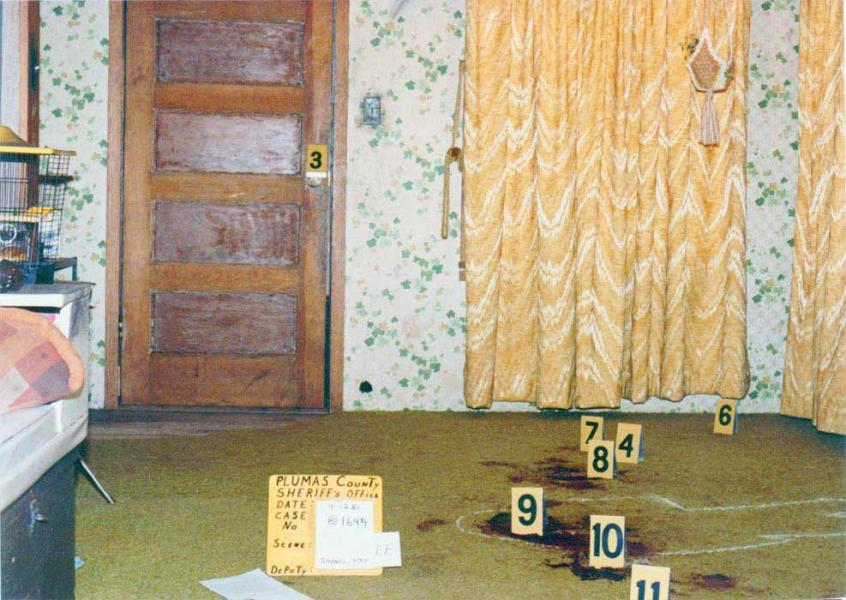
The house's front door and living room interior

Sheila and the Seabolt family (with whom Sheila had spent the night in the neighboring home) heard no commotion during the night; a couple living in nearby house #16 was awakened at 1:15 a.m. by what sounded like muffled screaming coming from the direction of the rear area of #28.

Justin's stepfather Martin Smartt, a neighbor and main suspect, claimed that a claw hammer had inexplicably gone missing from his home. In addition to interviewing the Smartts, detectives interviewed numerous other locals and neighbors; several, including members of the Seabolt family, recalled seeing a green van parked at the Sharps' house at around 9:00 p.m.

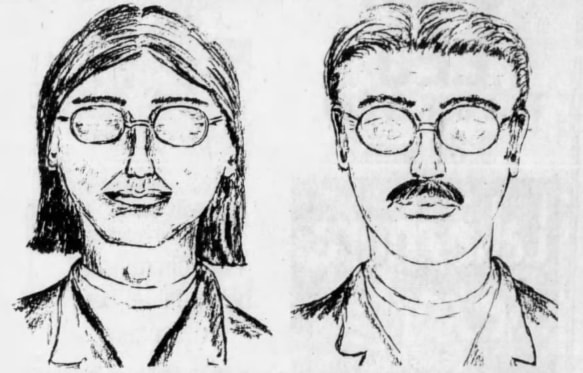
Original composite sketches of two suspects based on testimony from Justin, who claimed to have witnessed the crimes

Justin offered conflicting stories of the evening and stated that he had dreamed details of the murders. In his later account of events, told under hypnosis, he claimed to have seen Sue with two men.

Based on Justin's descriptions, composite sketches of the two unknown men were produced by Harlan Embry, a man with no artistic ability and no training in forensic sketching. It was never explained why, with access to the Justice Department's and the Federal Bureau of Investigation's (FBI) top forensic artists, law enforcement chose to use an amateur who sometimes volunteered to help local police. In press releases accompanying the sketches, the suspects were described as in their late 20s to early 30s; one stood between 5 feet 11 inches (1.80 m) to 6 feet 2 inches (1.88 m) tall with dark-blonde hair, and the other between 5 feet 6 inches (1.68 m) and 5 feet 10 inches (1.78 m) with black, greased hair. Both wore gold-framed sunglasses.

Rumors regarding the crimes being ritualistic or motivated by drug trafficking were dismissed by Plumas County sheriff Doug Thomas, who stated in the week following the murders that neither drug paraphernalia nor illegal drugs were found in the home.

=== Recovery of Tina Sharp's remains ===
Tina's disappearance was initially investigated by the FBI as a possible abduction, although it was reported on April 29, 1981, that the FBI had "backed off" the search as the California State Department of Justice was doing an "adequate job" and "made the FBI's presence unnecessary."

On April 11, 1984, the third anniversary of the murders, a bottle collector discovered the cranium portion of a human skull and part of a mandible at Camp 18 near Feather Falls in neighboring Butte County, roughly 5 miles (8.0 km) from Feather Falls, CA. The remains were confirmed by a forensic pathologist to be those of Tina in June 1984.

Shortly after announcing the discovery, the Butte County sheriff's office received an anonymous call that identified the remains as belonging to Tina, but the call was not documented. A tape containing a recording of the call was found at the bottom of an evidence box at some point after 2013 by a deputy who was assigned to the case.

=== Subsequent developments ===
The house in which the murders occurred was demolished in 2004.

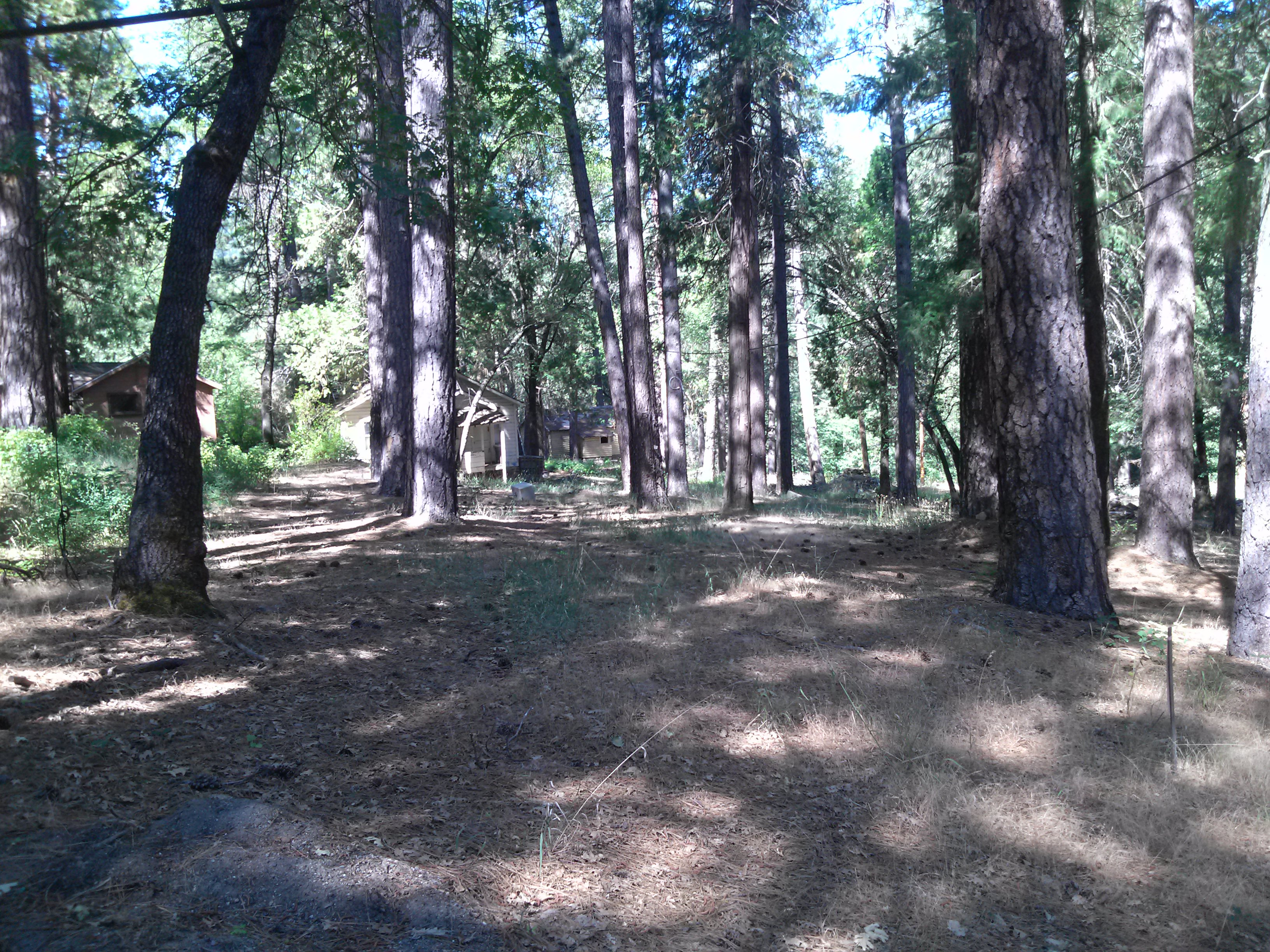
Site of former #28 in July 2012

According to a 2016 article published by The Sacramento Bee, Martin Smartt had left Keddie and driven to Reno, Nevada, shortly after the murders. While there, he sent a letter to his wife Marilyn ruminating on personal struggles in their marriage, in which he stated, "I've paid the price of your love & now I've bought it with four people's lives." In a 2016 interview, Plumas County special investigator Mike Gamberg stated that the letter was "overlooked" in the initial investigation and was never admitted as evidence. He later criticized the quality of the initial investigation, saying, "You could take someone just coming out of the academy, and they'd have done a better job." A counselor whom Smartt regularly visited also alleged that he had admitted to the murders of Sue and Tina but claimed, "I didn't have anything to do with [the boys]." He allegedly told the counselor that Tina was killed to prevent her from identifying him, as she had "witnessed the whole thing."

John Boubede, another suspect who was in the same neighboring cabin as Smartt, allegedly had ties to organized crime in Chicago. He died in 1988.

On March 24, 2016, a hammer matching the description of the one Smartt had claimed to have lost was discovered in a local pond and taken into evidence by Gamberg. Plumas County sheriff Greg Hagwood, who was 16 years old at the time of the murders and knew the Sharp family, stated that "the location [where] it was found.... It would have been intentionally put there. It would not have been accidentally misplaced." Gamberg also stated that at that time, six potential suspects were being examined.

In April 2018, Gamberg stated that DNA evidence recovered from a piece of tape at the crime scene matched that of a known living suspect.

== See also ==
- List of homicides in California
- List of solved missing person cases: 1950–1999
- List of unsolved murders (1980–1999)

== Sources ==
- Scott, Robert (2012). "Nightmare on Spanish Creek". In Flowers, R. Barri (ed.). Masters of True Crime: Chilling Stories of Murder and the Macabre. Amherst, New York: Prometheus Books. pp. 73–81. ISBN 978-1-616-14567-5.
- Simpson, Philip L. (2013). "'There's Blood on the Walls': Serial Killing as Post-9/11 Terror in The Strangers". In Alzena MacDonald (ed.). Murders and Acquisitions: Representations of the Serial Killer in Popular Culture. London: Bloomsbury Publishing. pp. 181–202. doi:10.5040/9781628928211. ISBN 978-1-4411-7702-5.
