= Kewaunee, Green Bay and Western Railroad =

Railroad in Wisconsin

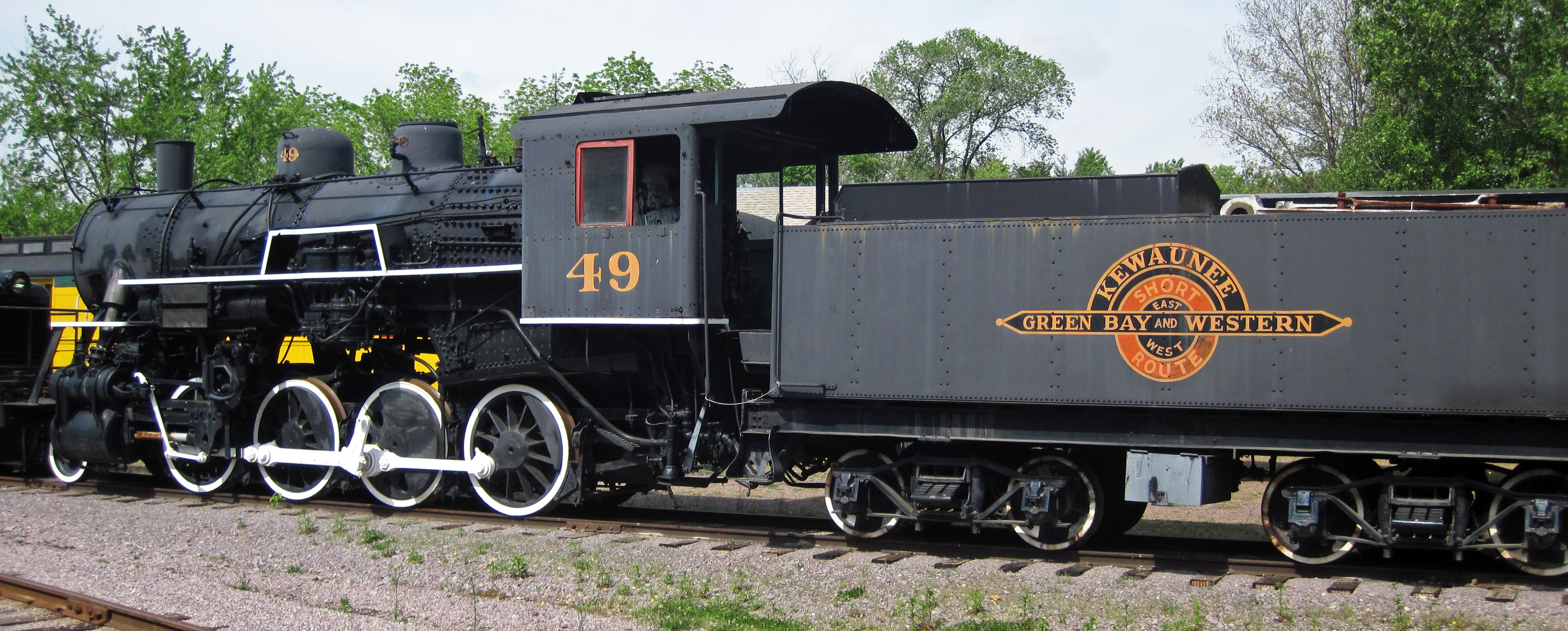
Kewaunee, Green Bay & Western locomotive #49 (2-8-0) & tender, on display at Mid-Continent Railway Museum.

The Kewaunee, Green Bay and Western Railroad, constructed with Lackawanna Trust and W. W. Cargill backing, was incorporated on May 19, 1890, for the purpose of moving cargo between the port cities of Green Bay and Kewaunee in Wisconsin. At first, cargo was transferred between freight cars and steamships manually, but before long carferries equipped with rails on their decks began transporting the railroad cars themselves across the lake between Kewaunee in Wisconsin and Frankfort and Ludington in Michigan.

The KGB&W also connected with other rail lines such as the Ahnapee & Western at Casco Junction; the Green Bay, Winona, & Saint Paul (later the Green Bay and Western Railroad), Milwaukee Road and the Chicago and Northwestern in Green Bay; and the Pere Marquette Railway and Ann Arbor Railroad via carferries at Kewaunee.

In 1896, the KGB&W, along with the GBW&SP, were sold to a group of east coast and local investors, and operated together as the Green Bay Lines. The merger would be fully completed in 1969, when the KGB&W was fully absorbed by the Green Bay Route.

On January 19, 2000, by decision and notice of interim trail use or abandonment (NITU) served on August 3, 1998, an interim trail use/rail banking agreement for 16.7-mile line of railroad, known as the Luxemburg-Kewaunee Line, extending from milepost 18.9 near Luxemburg to milepost 35.6 at the end of the line near Kewaunee, in Kewaunee County, WI was granted.

== See also ==
Green Bay Route
