= Keddie, California =

Keddie
- Unincorporated Community; Census Designated Place
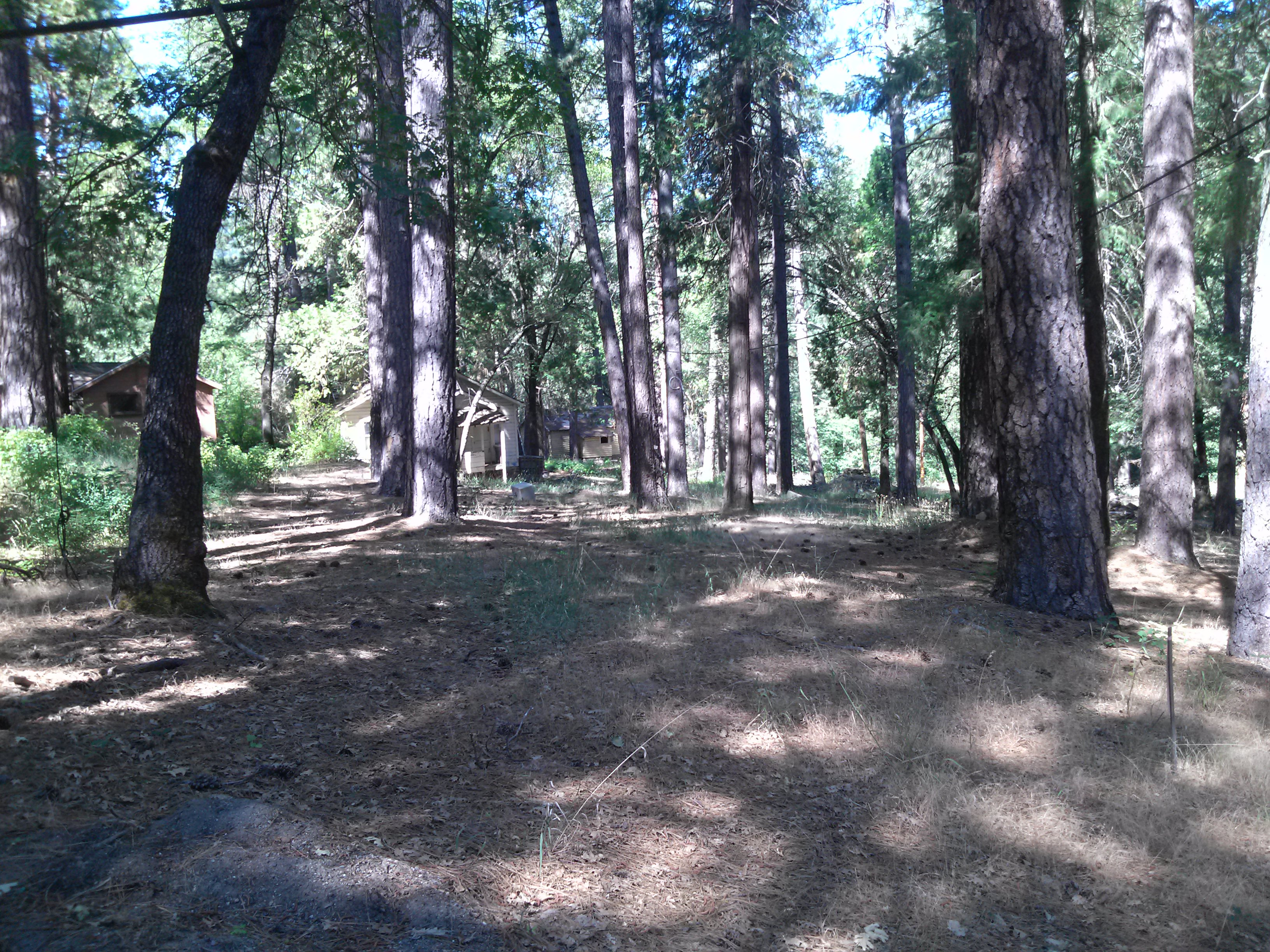
- Keddie Resort grounds in 2012, including former site of cabin in which the Keddie murders occurred

- Location in Plumas County and the state of California

- Location in the United States
- Coordinates: 40°0′21″N 120°57′25″W
- Country: United States
- State: California
- County: Plumas

Area
  - Total: 0.657 sq mi (1.702 km^{2})
  - Land: 0.657 sq mi (1.702 km^{2})
  - Water: 0 sq mi (0 km^{2}) 0%
- Elevation: 3,264 ft (995 m)

Population (2020)
  - Total: 51
  - Density: 78/sq mi (30/km^{2})
- Time zone: UTC-8 (Pacific (PST))
  - Summer (DST): UTC-7 (PDT)
- ZIP code: 95952
- Area code: 530
- FIPS code: 06-37904
- GNIS feature ID: 1656106

Keddie is a census-designated place in Plumas County, California, United States. The population was 51 at the 2020 census.

== Geography ==
According to the United States Census Bureau, the CDP has a total area of 0.66 square miles (1.7 km^{2}), all land.

Keddie is the location of the Keddie Wye, a railroad junction that features bridges and tunnels.

== History ==
A post office called Keddie was established in 1910, and remained in operation until 1966. The community's name honors Arthur Walter Keddie, a railroad surveyor.

Keddie was also the site of the Keddie murders, a notorious unsolved mass murder.

== Demographics ==
Historical population
Census	Pop.	Note	%±
2000	96		—
2010	66		−31.2%
2020	51		−22.7%
U.S. Decennial Census; 1860–1870 1880-1890; 1900 1910 1920; 1930 1940 1950; 1960 1970 1980; 1990 2000 2010

Keddie first appeared as a census designated place in the 2000 U.S. census.

=== 2020 ===
Keddie CDP, California – Racial and ethnic composition Note: the US Census treats Hispanic/Latino as an ethnic category. This table excludes Latinos from the racial categories and assigns them to a separate category. Hispanics/Latinos may be of any race.
Race / Ethnicity (NH = Non-Hispanic)	Pop 2000	Pop 2010	Pop 2020	% 2000	% 2010	% 2020
White alone (NH)	81	62	40	84.38%	93.94%	78.43%
Black or African American alone (NH)	2	2	0	2.08%	3.03%	0.00%
Native American or Alaska Native alone (NH)	1	0	0	1.04%	0.00%	0.00%
Asian alone (NH)	3	0	0	3.13%	0.00%	0.00%
Native Hawaiian or Pacific Islander alone (NH)	0	0	0	0.00%	0.00%	0.00%
Other race alone (NH)	0	0	0	0.00%	0.00%	0.00%
Mixed race or Multiracial (NH)	2	2	2	2.08%	3.03%	3.92%
Hispanic or Latino (any race)	7	0	9	7.29%	0.00%	17.65%
Total	96	66	51	100.00%	100.00%	100.00%

The 2020 United States census reported that Keddie had a population of 51. The population density was 77.6 inhabitants per square mile (30.0/km^{2}). The racial makeup of Keddie was 44 (86%) White, 0 (0%) African American, 0 (0%) Native American, 0 (0%) Asian, 0 (0%) Pacific Islander, 1 (2%) from other races, and 6 (12%) from two or more races. Hispanic or Latino of any race were 9 persons (18%).

The whole population lived in households. There were 30 households, out of which 3 (10%) had children under the age of 18 living in them, 14 (47%) were married-couple households, 4 (13%) were cohabiting couple households, 6 (20%) had a female householder with no partner present, and 6 (20%) had a male householder with no partner present. 8 households (27%) were one person, and 2 (7%) were one person aged 65 or older. The average household size was 1.70. There were 17 families (57% of all households).

The age distribution was 7 people (14%) under the age of 18, 1 person (2%) aged 18 to 24, 13 people (25%) aged 25 to 44, 22 people (43%) aged 45 to 64, and 8 people (16%) who were 65 years of age or older. The median age was 56.1 years. There were 28 males and 23 females.

There were 40 housing units at an average density of 60.9 units per square mile (23.5 units/km^{2}), of which 30 (75%) were occupied. Of these, 24 (80%) were owner-occupied, and 6 (20%) were occupied by renters.

=== 2010 ===
The 2010 United States census reported that the CDP had a population of 66. The population density was 102.3 inhabitants per square mile (39.5/km^{2}). There were 65 housing units at an average density of 100.7 per square mile (38.9/km^{2}). The racial makeup of the CDP was 94% White, 3% African American, and 3% from two or more races. 0% of the population was Hispanic or Latino of any race.

The Census reported that 100% of the population lived in households.

There were 32 households, of which 5 (16%) had children under the age of 18 living in them, 13 (41%) were opposite-sex married couples living together, 4 (13%) had a female householder with no spouse present, 2 (6%) had a male householder with no spouse present. There were 4 (13%) unmarried opposite-sex partnerships, and 1 (3%) same-sex married couples or partnerships. Eight households (25%) were made up of individuals, and 5 (16%) had someone living alone who was 65 years of age or older. The average household size was 2.06. There were 19 families (59% of all households); the average family size was 2.47.

There were 7 people (11%) under the age of 18, 4 people (6%) aged 18 to 24, 7 people (11%) aged 25 to 44, 29 people (44%) aged 45 to 64, and 19 people (29%) who were 65 years of age or older. The median age was 52.5 years. For every 100 females, there were 100.0 males. For every 100 females age 18 and over, there were 90.3 males.

There were 65 housing units of which 78% were owner-occupied and 22% were occupied by renters. The homeowner vacancy rate was 0%; the rental vacancy rate was 22%. 77% of the population lived in owner-occupied housing units and 23% lived in rental housing units.

== Politics ==
In the state legislature, Keddie is in the 1st senatorial district, represented by Republican Megan Dahle, and the 1st Assembly district, represented by Republican Heather Hadwick.

Federally, Keddie is in California's 3rd congressional district, represented by Independent Kevin Kiley.

== Education ==
The school district is Plumas Unified School District.

== See also ==
- Keddie murders
