= Western Pacific Railroad =

Former Class I railroad in the United States

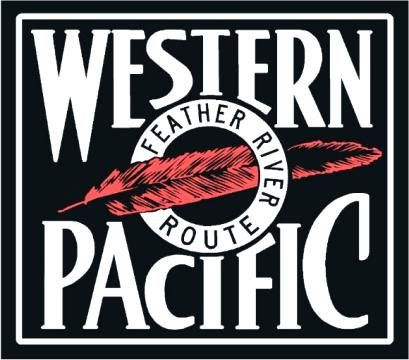

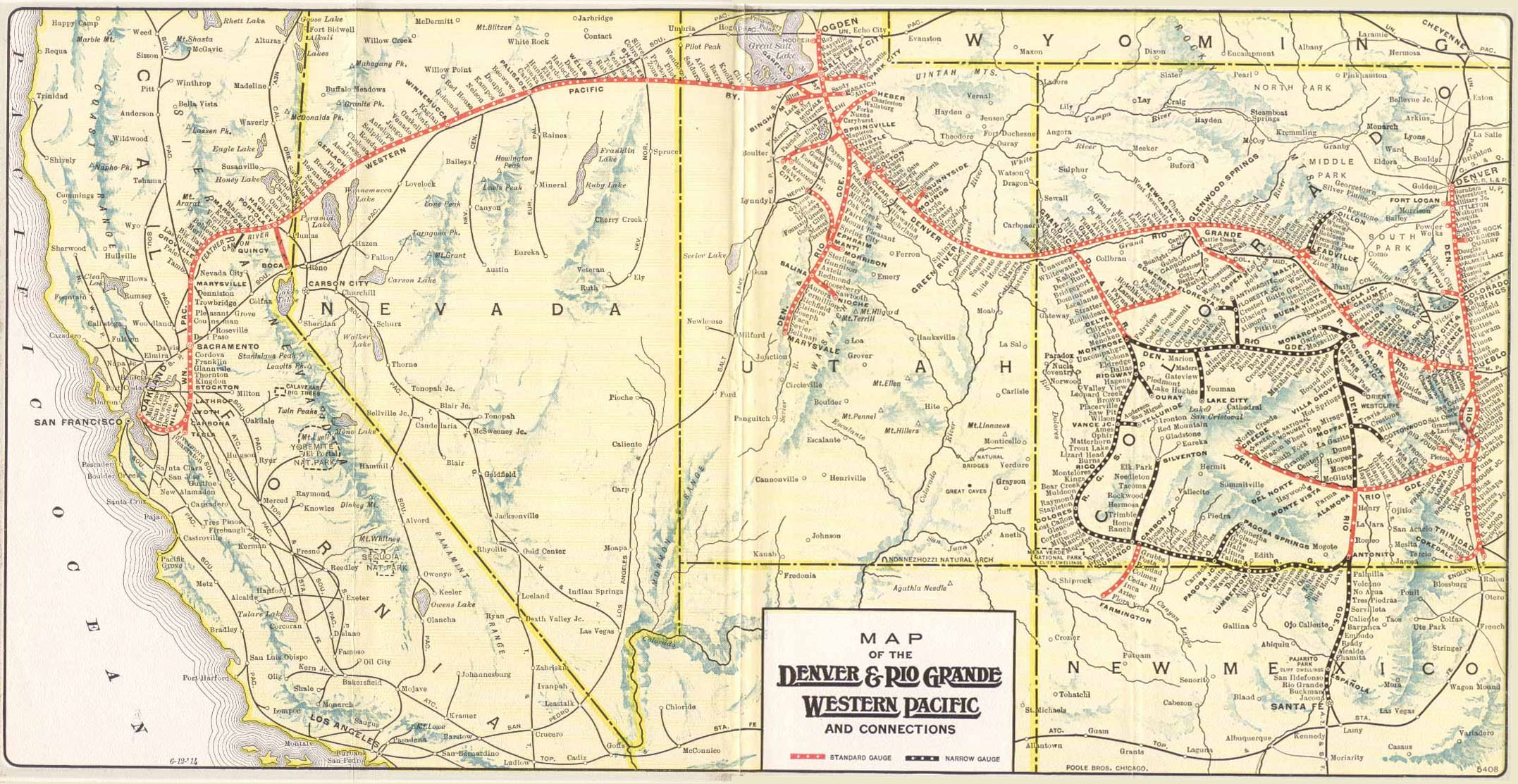
- c. 1914 Map of the Western Pacific and Denver and Rio Grande Western systems

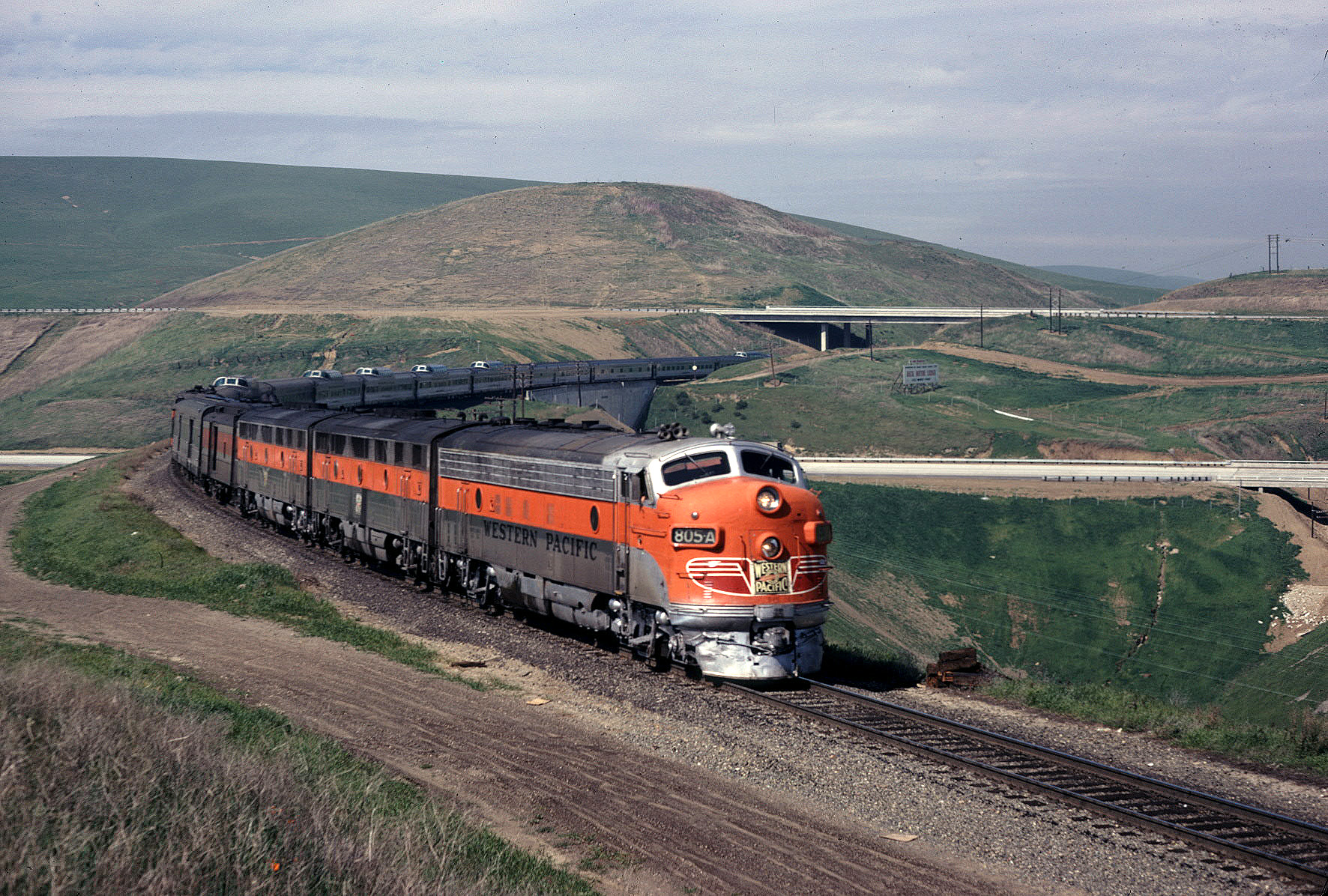
- An EMD FP7 leads the California Zephyr east through Altamont Pass in 1970

Overview
- Headquarters: Oakland, California
- Founders: George Jay Gould
- Reporting mark: WP
- Locale: Western United States
- Dates of operation: 1903–1983; 43 years ago
- Successor: Union Pacific Railroad

Technical
- Track gauge: 4 ft 8 1/2 in (1,435 mm) standard gauge

The Western Pacific Railroad (reporting mark WP) was a Class I railroad in the United States. It was formed in 1903 as an attempt to break the near-monopoly the Southern Pacific Railroad had on rail service into northern California. WP's Feather River Route directly competed with SP's portion of the Overland Route for rail traffic between Salt Lake City/Ogden, Utah, and Oakland, California, for nearly 80 years. The Western Pacific was one of the original operators of the California Zephyr passenger line.

In 1982, the Western Pacific was acquired by the Union Pacific Corporation and it was merged into the Union Pacific Railroad.

== History ==
The original Western Pacific Railroad (1862–1870) was established in 1862 to build the westernmost portion of the first transcontinental railroad, between Sacramento and San Jose, California (later to Oakland). After completing the last link from Sacramento to Oakland, this company was absorbed into the Central Pacific Railroad in 1870.

The second company to use the "western pacific" appellation was the Western Pacific Railway Company, founded in 1903. Under the direction of George Jay Gould I, the Western Pacific Railway proposed to build a standard gauge track connection to the Pacific Coast for his aspiring Gould transcontinental system. Construction was financed by the Denver and Rio Grande Western Railroad, a company in the Gould system, which had lost access to California due to the attempted acquisition of the Southern Pacific Railroad by the Rio Grande's main rival, the Union Pacific Railroad. The Western Pacific Railway acquired the Alameda and San Joaquin Railroad and began construction on what became known as the Feather River Route. Completed in 1909, it was the last major rail line connected to California. After Western Pacific Railway Company defaulted on mortgage bonds, its assets were sold in 1916 to The Western Pacific Railroad Company.

The original line used 85 lb/yd rail on untreated ties, with no tie plates except on curves over one degree; in 1935 more than half of the main line still had its original rail, most of it having carried 150 million gross tons.

In 1931 Western Pacific opened a main line north from the Feather River Canyon to the Great Northern Railway in northern California. This route, today part of BNSF's Gateway Subdivision, joined the Oakland – Salt Lake City main line at the Keddie Wye, a unique combination of two steel trestles and a tunnel forming a triangle of intersecting track. In 1935, the railroad went bankrupt because of decreased freight and passenger traffic caused by the Great Depression and had to be reorganized.

Western Pacific (WP) operated the California Zephyr passenger train with the Denver and Rio Grande Western Railroad and the Chicago, Burlington and Quincy Railroad. The WP handled the "Silver Lady" from Oakland, California, to Salt Lake City, Utah from 1949 to 1970. The Western Pacific owned several connecting short-line railroads. The largest was the Sacramento Northern Railway, which once reached from San Francisco to Chico, California. Others included the Tidewater Southern Railway, the Central California Traction, the Indian Valley Railroad and the Deep Creek Railroad. In December 1953, the Railroad retired its last steam locomotive from revenue service. At the end of 1970, WP operated 1,187 miles (1,910 km) of road and 1,980 miles (3,190 km) of track, not including its Sacramento Northern and Tidewater Southern subsidiaries.

Western Pacific logo from 1979 to 1983

In 1982, the Interstate Commerce Commission approved the purchase of the Western Pacific and the Missouri Pacific Railroad by the Union Pacific Corporation. The transaction closed the following year, merging the WP and the Missouri Pacific to form a combined Union Pacific rail system. The Union Pacific maintains one locomotive in its fleet, Union Pacific 1983, in a Western Pacific influenced livery.

== Passenger operations ==
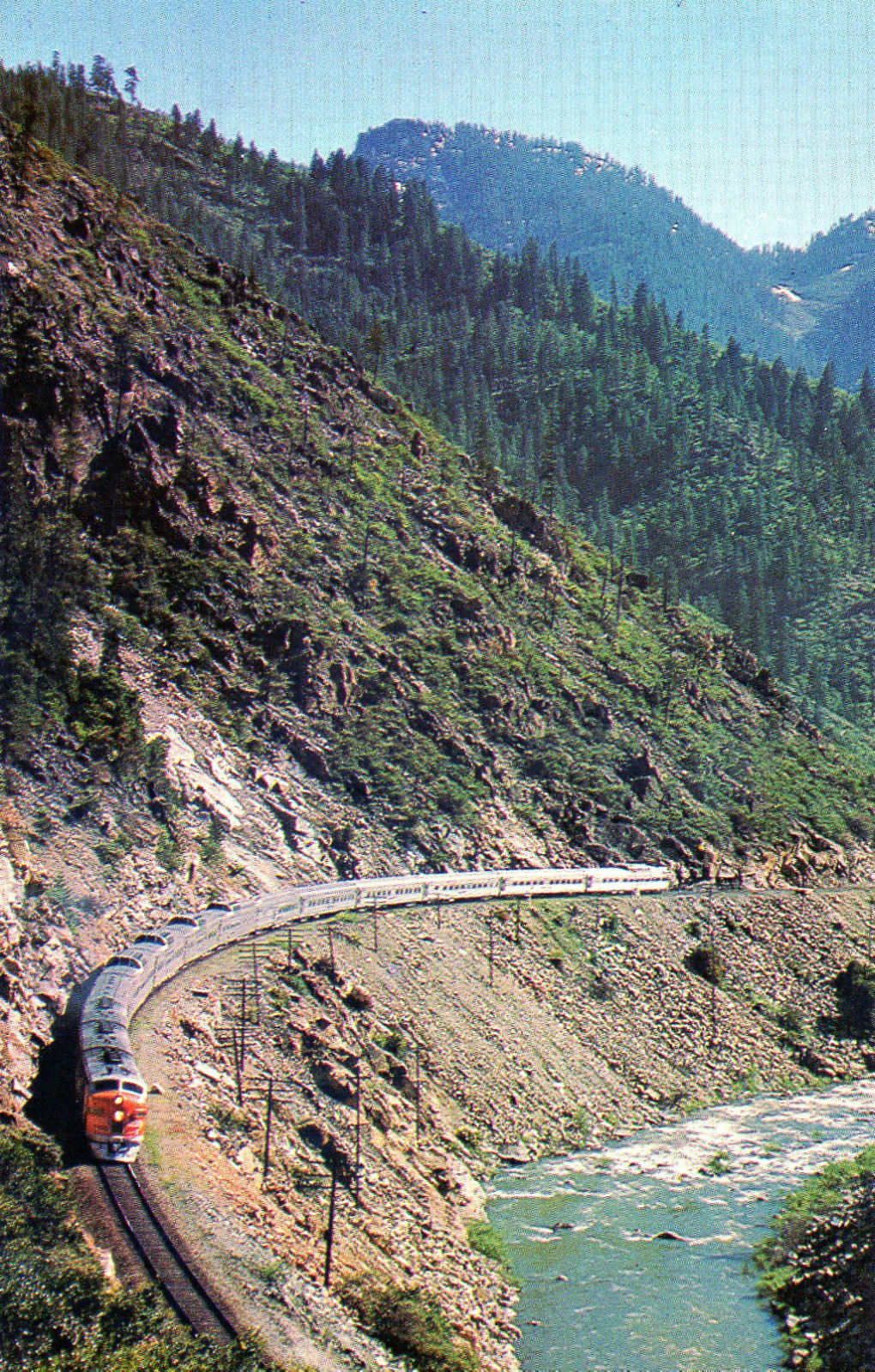
California Zephyr pulled by Western Pacific locomotives through Feather River Canyon

The California Zephyr was the famous Western Pacific passenger train but the railroad had a few others:

- Exposition Flyer (Chicago to Oakland in conjunction with the Chicago, Burlington and Quincy Railroad and Denver and Rio Grande Western Railroad, 1939 to 1949; named after the Golden Gate International Exposition of 1939 and 1940)
- Royal Gorge (between Oakland and Denver via Pueblo)
- Scenic Limited (between Oakland and Denver via Pueblo)
- Zephyrette (between Oakland and Salt Lake City)

== Executives ==
There were twelve presidents of the railroad:

- Walter J. Bartnett (March 3, 1903 to June 23, 1905)
- Edward T. Jeffery (June 23, 1905 to November 6, 1913)
- Benjamin F. Bush (November 6, 1913 to March 4, 1915)
- Charles M. Levey (July 14, 1916 to March 30, 1927)
- Harry M. Adams (March 30, 1927 to December 31, 1931)
- Charles Elsey (January 1, 1932 to December 31, 1948)
- Harry A. Mitchell (January 1, 1949 to July 1, 1949)
- Frederic B. Whitman (July 1, 1949 to June 30, 1965)
- Myron M. Christy (June 30, 1965 to November 30, 1970)
- Alfred E. Perlman (December 1, 1970 to December 31, 1972)
- Robert G. "Mike" Flannery (January 1, 1973 to June 9, 1982)
- Robert C. Marquis (June 9, 1982 to January 11, 1983)

== Gallery ==
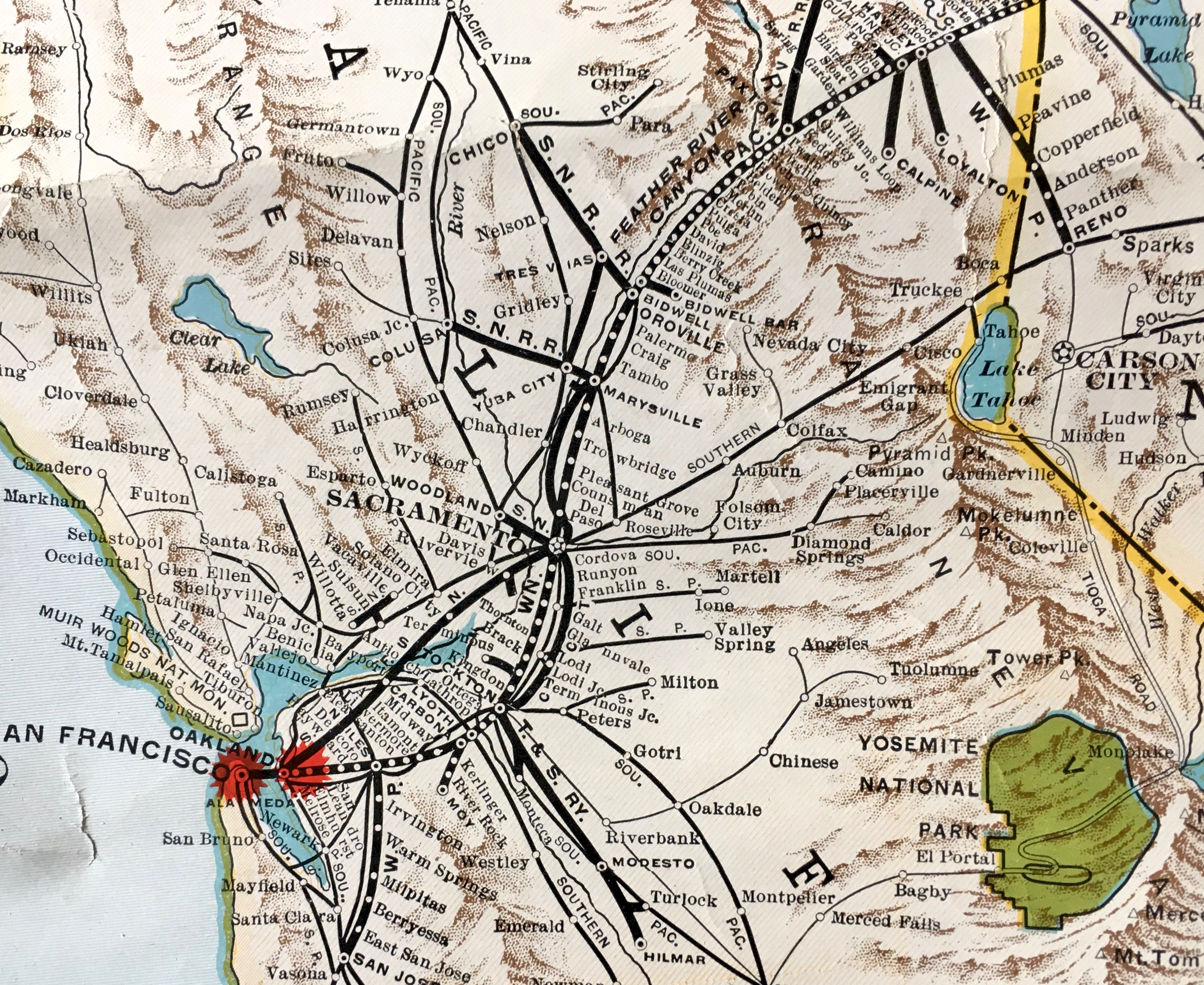
Western Pacific map of California in 1931

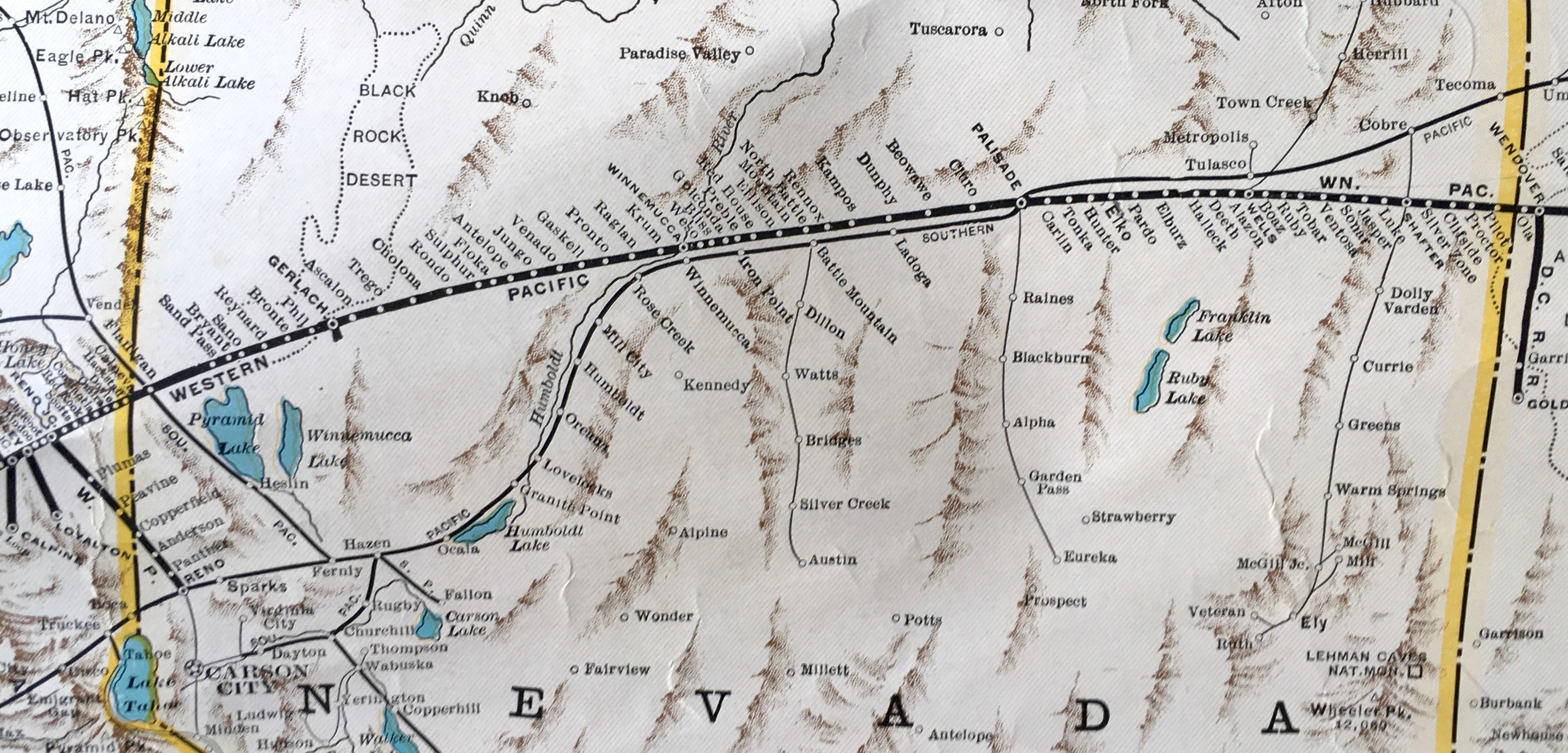
Western Pacific map of Nevada in 1931

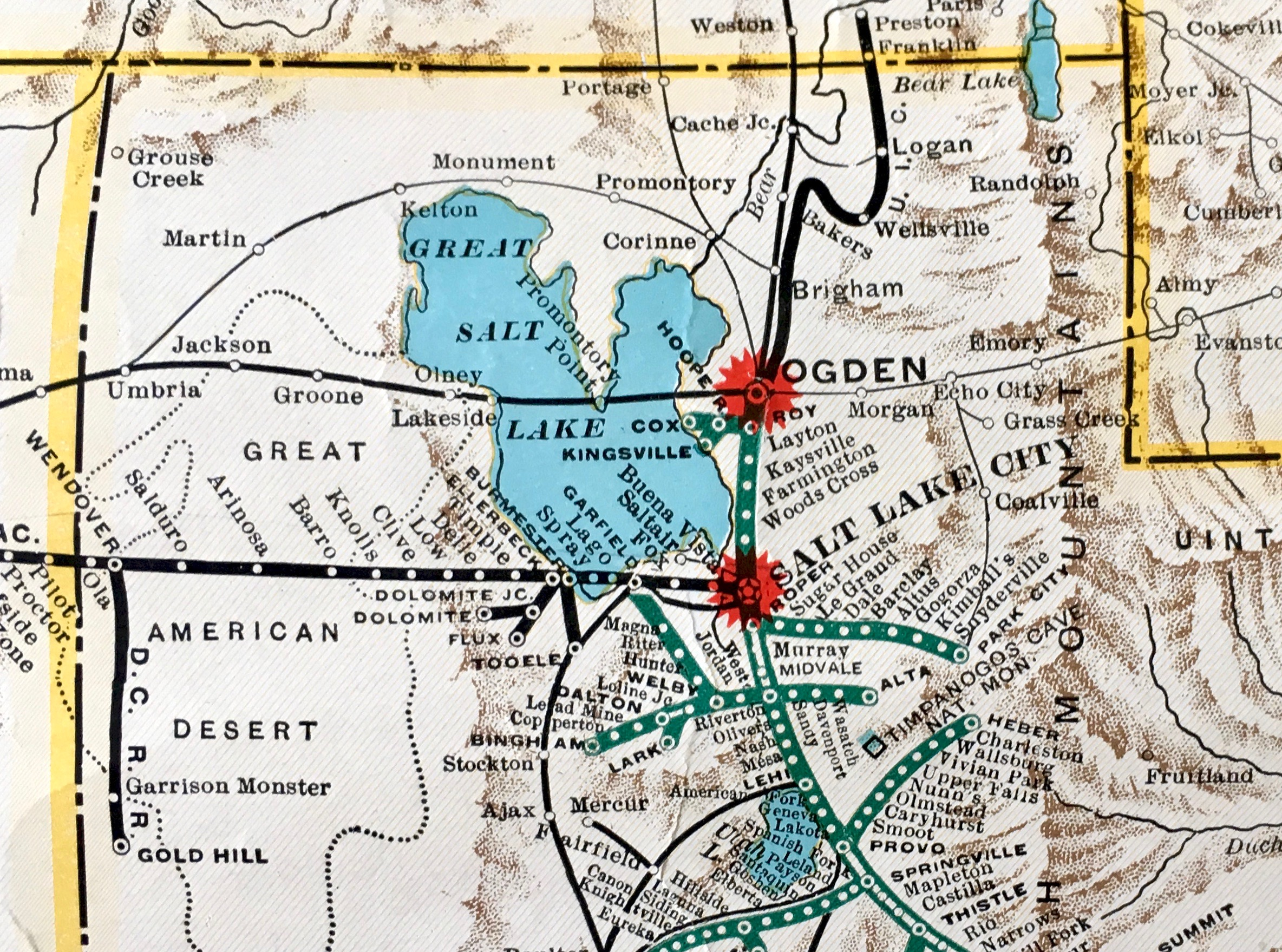
Western Pacific map of Utah in 1931

== See also ==
- Hercules – A steam-powered tugboat previously owned by the Western Pacific
- Western Pacific Railroad Museum
- Western Refrigerator Line – Subsidiary of the Western Pacific
