= Western Refrigerator Line =

An ACF builder's photo of Pacific Fruit Express car #50187, one of the first to wear the WP's "Feather River Route" emblem.

Two distinct and separate railroad refrigerator car companies have operated under the name Western Refrigerator Line.

The first, the Western Refrigerator Line (WRL) was a refrigerator car leasing company founded by the Western Pacific Railroad on January 1, 1923 specifically to service the fruit and green vegetable farmers in California's Central Valley. In early 1924, however, the WP and Pacific Fruit Express entered into an agreement whereby the PFE would handle all of Western Pacific's perishable goods. All of the WP's 2,000 pieces of existing rolling stock were placed into PFE's car pool, including an additional 775 units ordered that year.

All cars delivered prior to the agreement were painted yellow with black ends and roofs, were lettered "Western Refrigerator Line," and bore a diamond-shaped herald formed by the words "Perishable Products" surrounding the letters "WRL." Units arriving after the contract's execution were painted yellow-orange, were lettered and numbered according to PFE's classification, and were emblazoned with WP's "Feather River Route" emblem on each side.

After three decades of service, 900 of the best cars were reconditioned at PFE's Roseville, California shops. The units were outfitted with electrically powered circulation fans and other improvements required to bring them up to current standards. By 1967, all but a few of the cars had been retired. Facing the need to invest millions of dollars toward the purchase of new, mechanically cooled refrigerator cars, the Western Pacific chose instead to become a partner in the PFE's rival Fruit Growers Express in June of that year (which, at the time, controlled 24,000 mechanical reefers and 3,500 refrigerated tractor-trailer sets).

A handful of the original wood refrigerator cars were converted for ice service on the WP system.

The Western Refrigerator Line Company (WRX) was established in 1929 to operate a 500-car fleet of reefers for the Green Bay and Western Railroad (GBW). WRX was headquartered at Norwood Yard in Green Bay, Wisconsin until the property was purchased by the GBW in the 1960s. WRX rolling stock often sported the GBW's "Green Bay Route" emblem. By 1981, the WRX had become part of the Burlington Northern Railroad.

Western Refrigerator Line Company Roster, 1930–1970:

1930	1940	1950	1960	1970
500	500	481	386	198

Source: The Great Yellow Fleet, p. 17.
