= Feather Headwaters =

Watershed of the Feather River

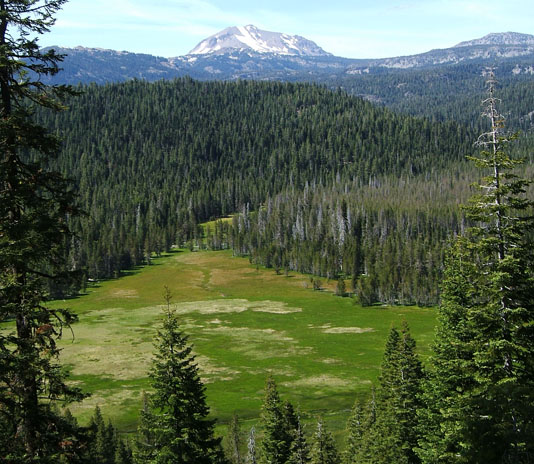
Buzzard Springs (foreground), a partial source of the North Fork Feather River.

The Feather Headwaters is the watershed of the Feather River above Lake Oroville, totaling 3,450 sq mi (8,900 km^{2}). Subdivided into 3 watersheds, the North Fork Feather Watershed is 1,090 sq mi (2,800 km^{2})—including the West Branch drainage of about 282.5 sq mi (732 km^{2}), the East Branch North Fork Feather Watershed is 1,010 sq mi (2,600 km^{2}), and the Middle Fork Feather Watershed is 1,350 sq mi (3,500 km^{2})—including the South Fork drainage of about 132 sq mi (340 km^{2}). Headwaters drainage is impaired by the Palermo Canal at Oroville Dam, the Hendricks Canal at the West Branch Feather River, and the Miners Ranch Canal at the South Fork's Ponderosa Reservoir. Additionally, the Pacific Gas and Electric Company releases Upper Feather water into the Hyatt Generating-Pumping Plant for hydroelectric generation during daily peak demand.

== North Fork ==
The North Fork Feather Watershed (USGS huc 18020121) includes the West Branch and North Fork rivers and receives flow from the East Branch North Fork Feather Watershed.

West Branch
The West Branch (or West Fork) Feather River originates in Butte County and Lassen National Forest and flows near the North Fork watershed's drainage divide with the Mills-Big Chico Watershed generally north-to-south to the northwest arm of Lake Oroville. The West Branch flow is impaired by up to 125 cu ft/s (3.5 m^{3}/s) diverted to the 8.66 mi (13.94 km) Hendricks Canal, and the Magalia 73 Dam conveys water to the Lime Saddle and Coal Canyon powerhouses near Lake Oroville, then to a Thermalito powerplant. The Little West Fork West Branch River is a similarly named West Branch tributary.

North Fork
The North Fork Feather River is the Feather River's source tributary with the largest watershed area and the highest average discharge into Lake Oroville. The fork's portion of the Feather River Canyon is notable as part of the Feather River Route, and the railroad's 1962 North Fork Bridge near the river's mouth is the longest reinforced concrete bridge in the United States. The East Branch North Fork Feather River is the largest tributary of the North Fork, and the headwaters of the North Fork Feather watershed extend from Lassen Peak in the Shasta Cascades to the east slope of Indicator Peak in the northern Sierras.

== East Branch North Fork ==
The East Branch Feather Watershed (USGS huc 18020122) is the middle watershed of the headwaters of the Feather River basin and includes the American and Indian valleys.

East Branch
The East Branch North Fork Feather River is a left tributary of the North Fork Feather River extending past Twain to near Belden. East Branch headwaters begin along ~46 mi (74 km) of the Sierra Crest from the triple watershed point with the North Fork (Bear Valley Creek headwaters) across Diamond Mountain (Indian Creek), Black Mountain, and the Middle Fork triple point.

== Middle Fork ==
The Middle Fork Feather Watershed (USGS huc 18020123) includes the Middle Fork Feather River, the Fall River, and the South Fork Feather River; as well as the Grizzly Valley

Middle Fork
The Middle Fork Feather River drains from over 41 mi (66 km) of the Sierra Crest and from the Sierra Valley Channels through the Sierra Valley (location of its source) to the tip of the middle arm of Lake Oroville. The channels are a number of tributaries that merge in an inverted river delta wetland with a network of irrigation ditches and drains. From its source, the Middle fork flows through Mohawk Valley, Long Valley, and then enters a gorge before reaching the middle arm of Lake Oroville. The South Branch Middle Fork Feather River is a similarly named Middle Fork tributary.

Fall River
The Fall River is a Lake Oroville source tributary that drains a south portion of the Middle Fork Watershed and which enters the lake along the shore of the North Arm, 0.39 mi (0.63 km) from the Middle Fork's mouth at the tip of the arm. The river is notable as the source of water for Feather Falls in the Lake Oroville State Recreation Area.

South Fork
The South Fork Feather River is a Lake Oroville source tributary with several reservoirs in the southernmost portion of the Middle Fork Feather Watershed, including Little Grass Valley Reservoir.

The broad drainage divide of the Feather Headwaters lies northwest-to-southeast along 1) the divide with the Lower Pit Watershed (north of the North Fork Feather Watershed), 2) the Great Basin Divide at the Eagle-Honey Watershed (north & northeast of the North Fork Feather Watershed), 3) the northern Sierra Crest (northeast of the North Fork Feather & East Branch North Fork Feather watersheds), and 4) the northern Sierra Crest (east of the Middle Fork Feather Watershed) to the Truckee Watershed triple point in Sierra County.

== History ==
The Maidu inhabited the American and Sierra Valleys and had villages in the Big Meadows area (now Lake Almanor) and Indian Valley. The Washoe hunted in the Sierra and Mohawk Valleys, and Paiute and Washoe settlements were in the Long Valley area. The 1849 California Gold Rush brought thousands of prospectors and settlers to the region. The American and Indian Valleys were settled in the 1850s. In the Sierra Valley the first settlers arrived in 1852. Operations at the Lime Saddle and Coal Canyon hydroelectric powerhouses along the North Fork began August 1, 1906, and December 24, 1907. The 1909 Feather River Route was built through the Feather River Canyon along the North Fork and East Branch and crossed under the mid-Sierra drainage divide between the East Branch and Middle Fork watersheds via the Spring Garden tunnel. Other historical Feather River Route features (west-to-east) in the Feather Headwaters are the Keddie Wye, Williams Loop, Clio trestle, & Chilcoot Tunnel.
