= Fall River (Plumas County, California) =

Fall River (Lake Oroville)

Location
- Country: United States
- State: California
- Region: Middle Fork Feather Watershed
- District: Plumas County

Physical characteristics
- Source
  - location: near Little Grass Valley Reservoir
- Mouth: Lake Oroville Middle Arm
  - location: Butte County
  - elevation: 902 ft (275 m)

The Fall River is a Lake Oroville source tributary that drains the south portion of the Middle Fork Feather Watershed. The river enters the lake along the shore of the North Arm 0.39 mi (0.63 km) from the mouth of the North Fork Feather River at the tip of the arm and elevation 928 ft (283 m). The river is notable as the source of water for Feather Falls in the Lake Oroville State Recreation Area.

Fall River course.
	description	coordinates
headwaters	headpoint	
Fall River	source, west slope from headpoint	
Fall River	border, Plumas NF	
Fall River	road, Walters Ridge Rd	
Fall River	confluence, Boomer Creek	
Fall River	confluence, Quartz Creek	
Fall River	border, Plumas NF	
Fall River	confluence, Kenebeck Creek	
Fall River	Feather Falls	
Fall River	mouth, @ Lake Oroville Middle Arm	
