= Brad Freeman Trail =

The Brad Freeman Trail is bicycle trail near Oroville, California, which was part of the Feather River Route until the railroad was moved before construction of the Oroville Reservoir. During construction of the Oroville Dam, the railroad was used for hauling dam materials along the Feather River, and a train collision occurred at one of the trail's tunnels.
