= Honcut Creek =

Stream in California, United States

Coordinates: 39.2955°N 121.6244°W

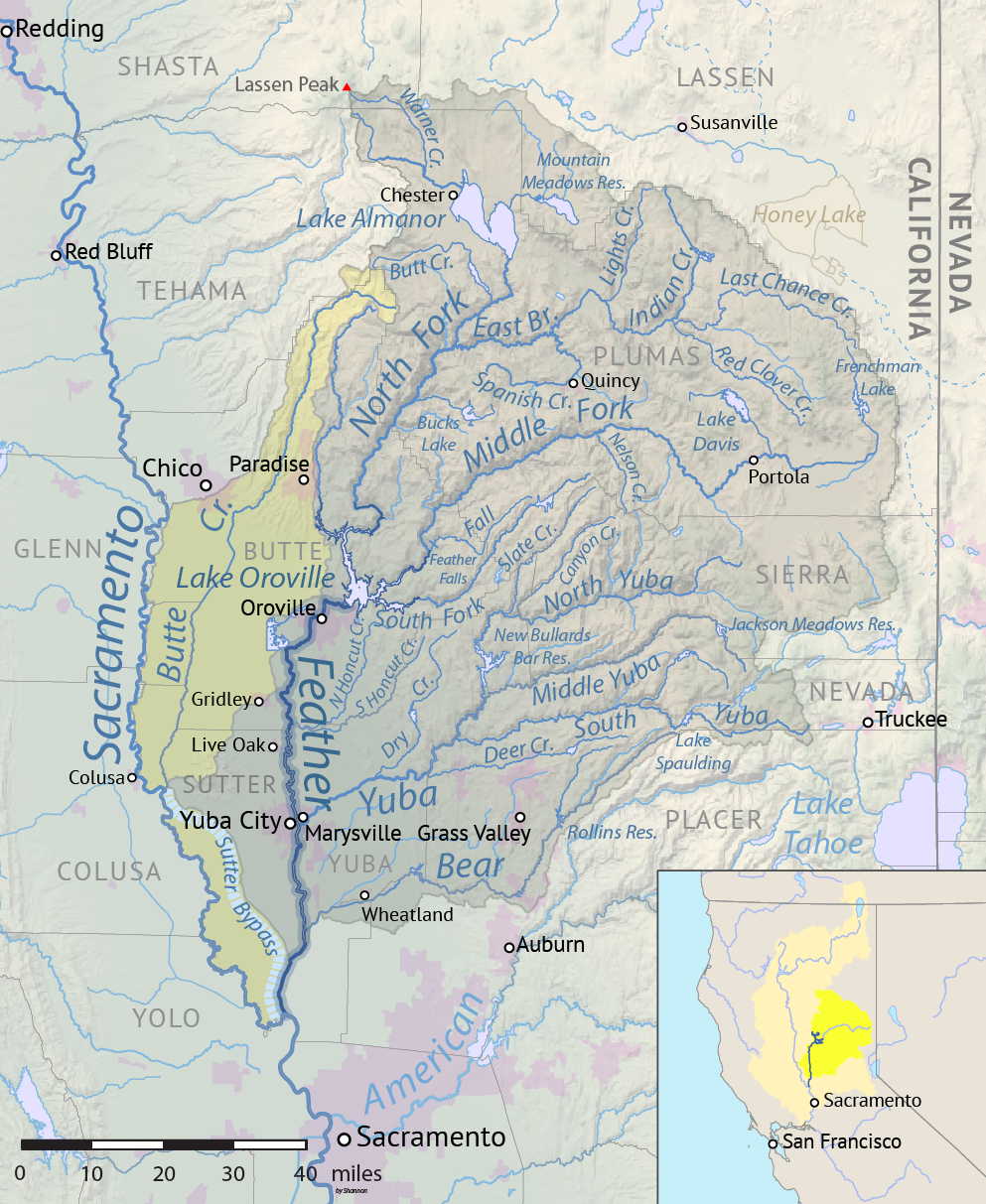
- Map of the Feather River watershed including Honcut Creek

Location
- Country: United States
- State: California

Physical characteristics
- Source
  - location: Sierra Nevada, near Lake Oroville
- Mouth
  - location: Feather River
  - elevation: 72 feet (22 m)
- Length: 20 miles (32 km) to farthest source
- Basin size: 130 square miles (340 km^{2})

Basin features
- River system: Sacramento River
- Tributaries
  - left: Wilson Creek

Honcut Creek is a stream in central California in the United States. It is a tributary of the Feather River and flows from the Sierra Nevada south and west into the river] in the Sacramento Valley.

The headwaters are in the Sierra Nevada, and include: North Honcut, Upper Rocky Honcut, South Honcut, and Natchez creeks. The creek area in the lower Feather River watershed includes Honcut, California, and locations of former settlements such as the Maidu's Honkut at the mouth of Honcut Creek and Honcut City, California, along North Honcut Creek.

== See also ==
- Feather Headwaters
