= Bear Ranch Creek =

Stream in California, United States

Coordinates: 39°50′36″N 121°23′50″W

Bear Ranch Creek is a stream located in Butte County, northern California, United States.

It is a 3 mile long tributary of the North Fork Feather River, which flows through the Sierra Nevada into Lake Oroville.
