= Lake Oroville State Recreation Area =

State park in California, United States

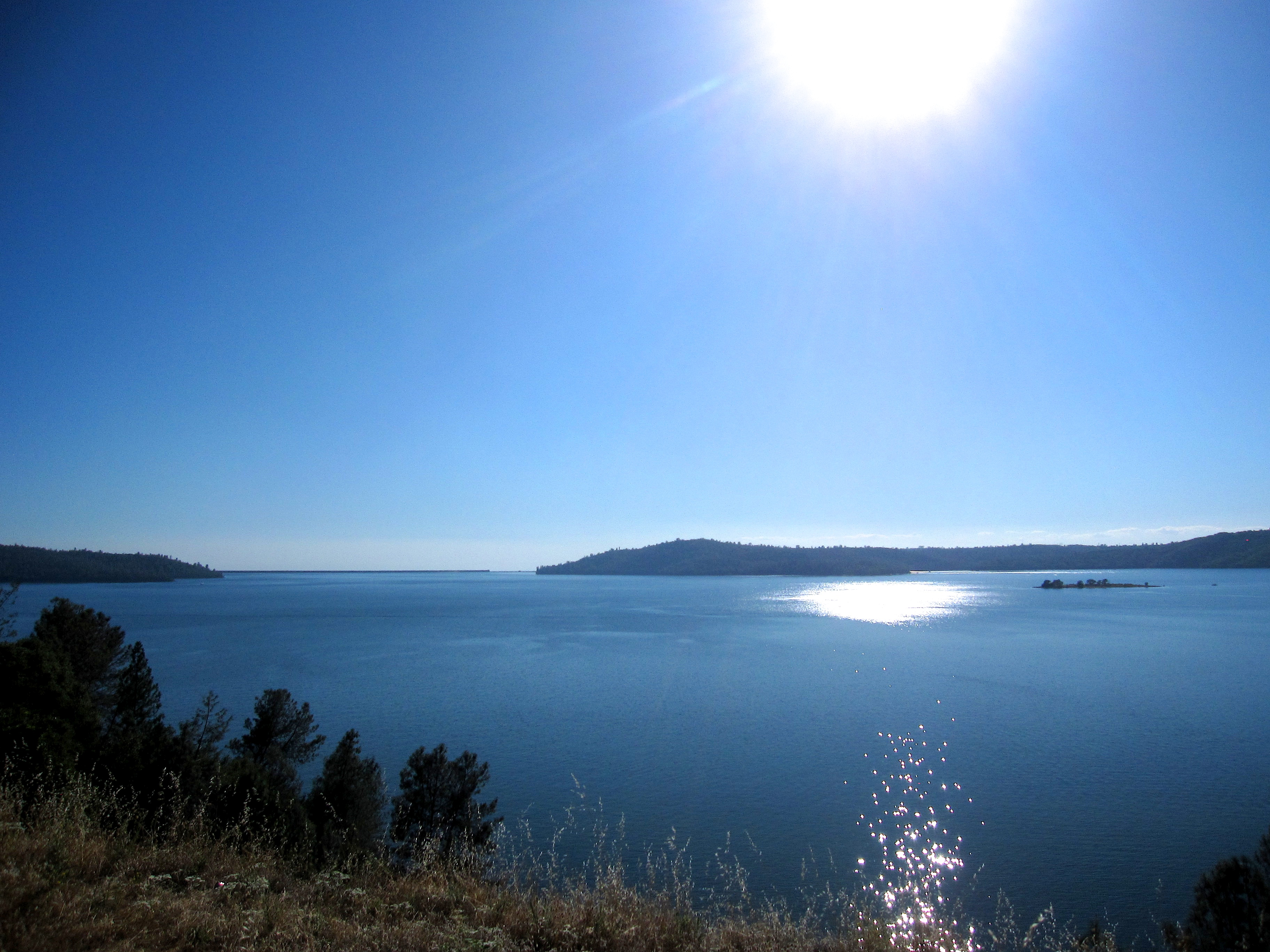
- Lake Oroville

- Location within California Location within the United States
- Location: Butte County, California, United States
- Nearest city: Oroville, California
- Coordinates: 39°33′49″N 121°27′23″W
- Area: 29,447 acres (11,917 ha)
- Established: 1967
- Governing body: California Department of Parks and Recreation

Lake Oroville State Recreation Area (LOSRA) is a state park unit of California, United States, surrounding Lake Oroville, a reservoir on the Feather River. It is located in Butte County outside Oroville, California. The 29,447-acre (11,917 ha) park was established in 1967. The recreation area "includes Lake Oroville and the surrounding lands and facilities within the project area as well as the land and waters in and around the Diversion Pool and Thermalito Forebay, downstream of Oroville Dam."

== Recreation ==
The park and lake support outdoor recreation such as camping, picnicking, horseback riding, hiking, sail and power-boating, water-skiing, fishing, swimming, boat-in camping, floating campsites, and horse camping. There is a visitor center with interpretive exhibits and a 47-foot (14 m) observation tower overlooking the lake and dam.

Nearby attractions are Feather Falls and the Feather River Fish Hatchery.

Hidden train tunnels - When the water level gets low you can see train tunnels that are normally submerged. One tunnel is found in the Berry Creek cove when the water level gets down to about 720 ft level.

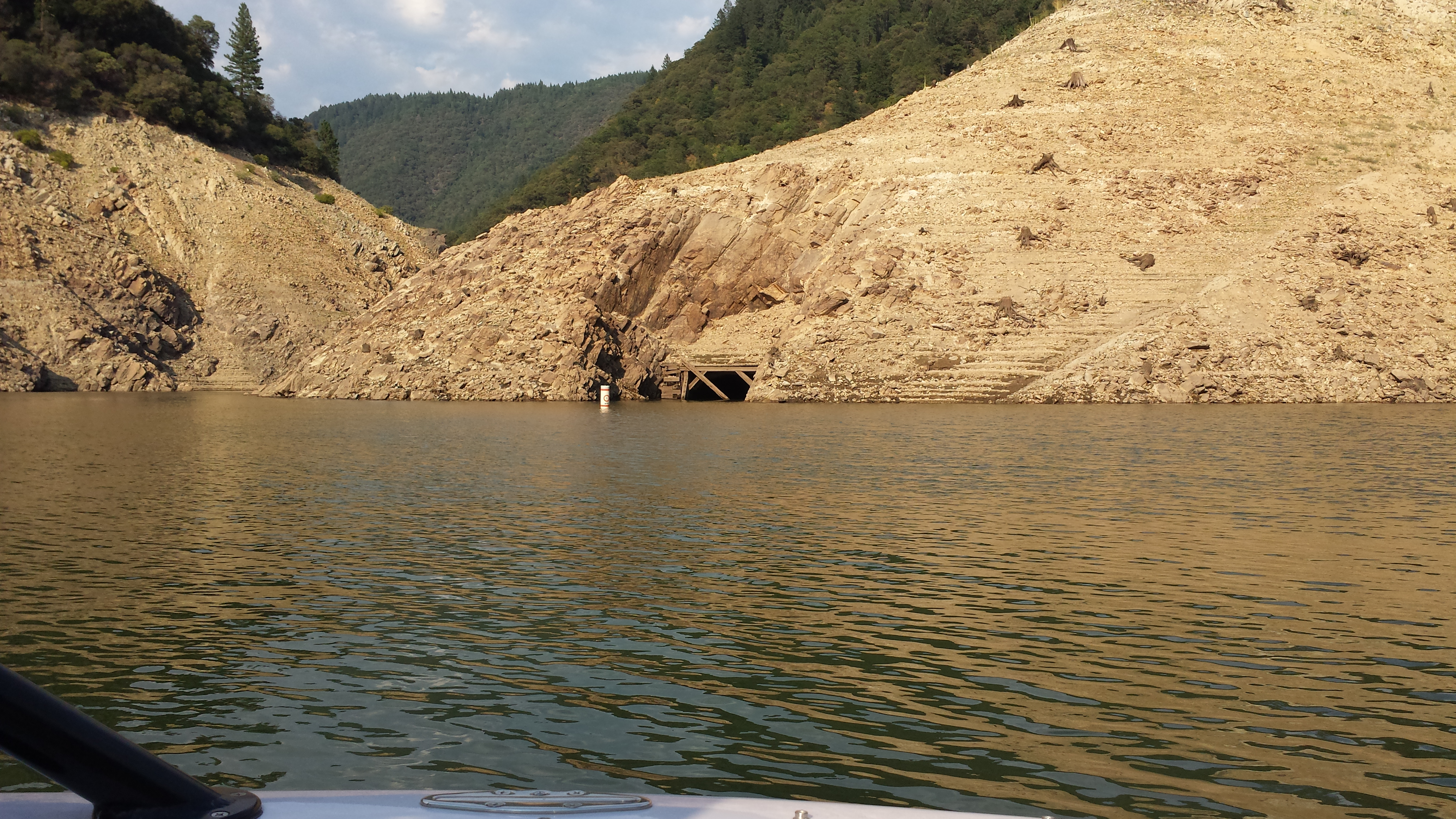
Berry Creek Train Tunnel

== See also ==
- List of California state parks
