= Feather Falls =

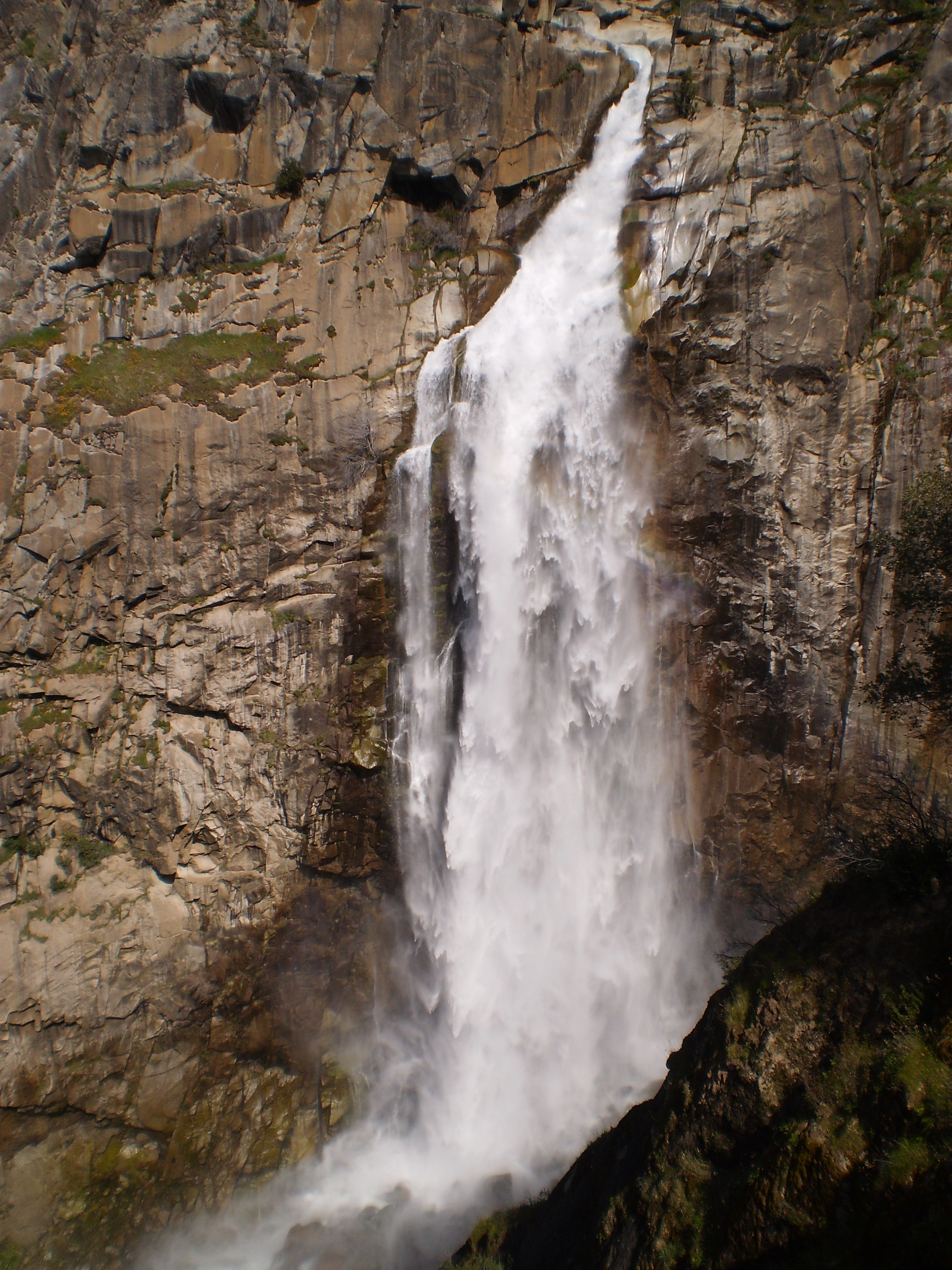
- Feather Falls

- Location within California
- Location: Plumas National Forest, Butte County, California, U.S.
- Coordinates: 39.642943°N 121.274407°WU.S. Geological Survey Geographic Names Information System: Feather Falls
- Type: Plunge
- Total height: 410 ft (120 m)
- Number of drops: 1

Feather Falls is a waterfall located on the Fall River, a tributary of the Middle Fork Feather River, within the Plumas National Forest in the Sierra Nevada mountain range in Butte County, eastern California, United States.

== Description ==
The Feather Falls were measured to be 410 feet tall. This concurs with the USGS Brush Creek 7½" quadrangle information. They have been incorrectly claimed to stand 640 feet tall.

The falls can be partially seen from the middle arm of Lake Oroville but are usually observed from a platform accessed by either of two trails maintained by the United States Forest Service. The nearby town of Feather Falls, California takes its name from the falls.

== Ladybugs ==
The area at Frey Creek is a famous stopping point for migrating ladybugs. Millions of ladybugs can be seen at Frey Creek during the winter months. The ladybugs can usually be seen from November to March, but some sightings have been reported as early as August. The ladybugs stay for the winter, and then fly back down into the valley when spring comes.

== See also ==
- List of waterfalls
- List of waterfalls in California
