= Oroville–Thermalito Complex =

Group of reservoirs and facilities in California

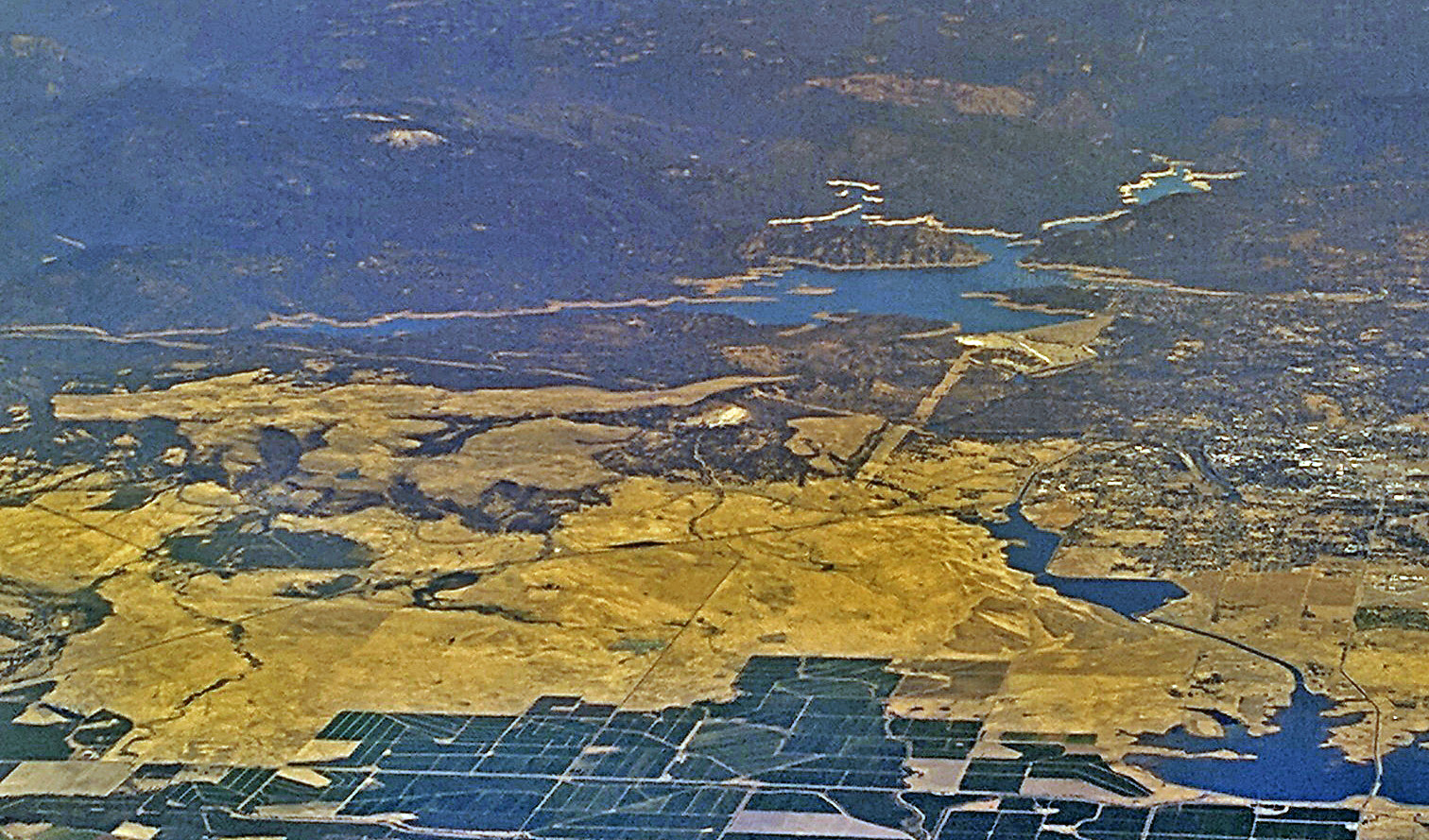
- Aerial view from the west showing Lake Oroville, the Oroville Dam, Thermalito Forebay and Thermalito Afterbay

Location
- State: California
- Region: Northern California
- County: Butte
- Nearest City(s): Oroville East, Ca, Oroville, Ca & Thermalito, Ca

Operations
- Operator: California Department of Water Resources (DWR)
- Other operators/co-operators: Feather River Recreation and Parks District (FRRPD), California Department of Fish and Game

Sources
- Primary source: Lake Oroville
- Other source(s): Feather River

Construction & operations
- Designed & built by: California Department of Water Resources
- Construction period: 1961-1969
- Operations began: 1968

The Oroville–Thermalito Complex is a group of reservoirs, structures, and facilities located in and around the city of Oroville in Butte County, California. The complex serves not only as a regional water conveyance and storage system, but is the headwaters for, and therefore perhaps is the most vital part of, the California Department of Water Resources' State Water Project, as one of the largest publicly built and operated water and power development and conveyance systems.

== Background ==
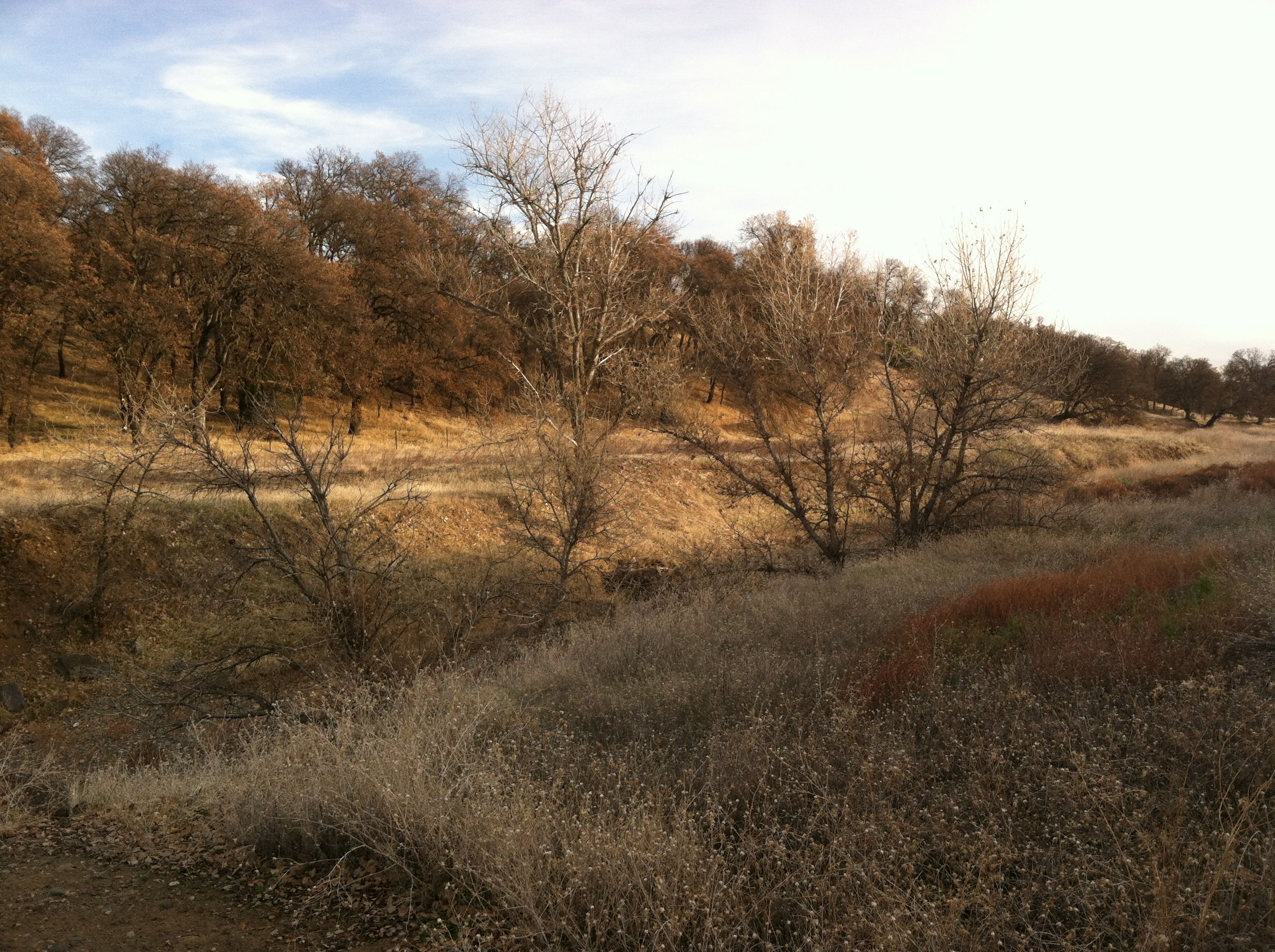
Dried creek off Thermalito Forebay

The Oroville–Thermalito Complex was designed as an efficient water and power storage and conveyance system. All reservoirs and canals, combined, store about 3,620,000 acre-feet (4.47 km^{3}) when at max capacity, and generate power from releases made through Hyatt Powerplant and two other generating plants in nearby Thermalito. A special fish barrier dam was built to lead salmon and steelhead, returning to spawn, into the Feather River Fish Hatchery. The California Office of Environmental Health Hazard Assessment (OEHHA) has developed a safe eating advisory for fish caught in the Thermalito Forebay and Afterbay based on levels of mercury or PCBs found in local species.

Water released from Lake Oroville is used to produce electricity via Hyatt Powerplant, located in the bedrock beneath and inside of the core of Oroville Dam. Water can either enter the Feather River through the one-unit Thermalito Diversion Dam Powerplant and the Diversion Dam's 14 radial spill gates or up to 17,000 cu ft/s (480 m^{3}/s) can be diverted into the Thermalito Power Canal.

From there, the water enters the Thermalito Power Canal and flows into Thermalito Forebay. At the end of the forebay, water enters the Thermalito Afterbay by way of the Thermalito Pumping–Generating Plant to produce electricity. The plant can also pump water back into the lake to be reused for power generation at Hyatt Powerplant when needed.

== Makeup ==
=== Lake Oroville ===
39°33′22″N 121°27′06″W

Lake Oroville is the second largest reservoir in California, and stores winter and spring runoff which is released into the Feather River at controlled intervals to meet the Project's needs. It also provides pumped-storage capacity, 750,000 acre-feet (930,000,000 m^{3}) of flood control storage, recreation, and freshwater releases to control salinity intrusion in the Sacramento-San Joaquin Delta and for fish and wildlife protection. The Lake is perhaps the most important of all the Oroville Complex facilities, being that it serves as the headwater of the entire State Water Project.

Lake Oroville has a maximum operating storage of 3,537,580 acre-feet (4.36354×10^{9} m^{3}), which, for purposes of scale, is equal to over 1.153 trillion gallons of water. The lake has a water surface area of 15,810 acres (64.0 km^{2}), a maximum water surface elevation of 901 feet (275 m), and 167 miles of shoreline.

=== Oroville Dam and spillway ===
39°32′15″N 121°29′01″W

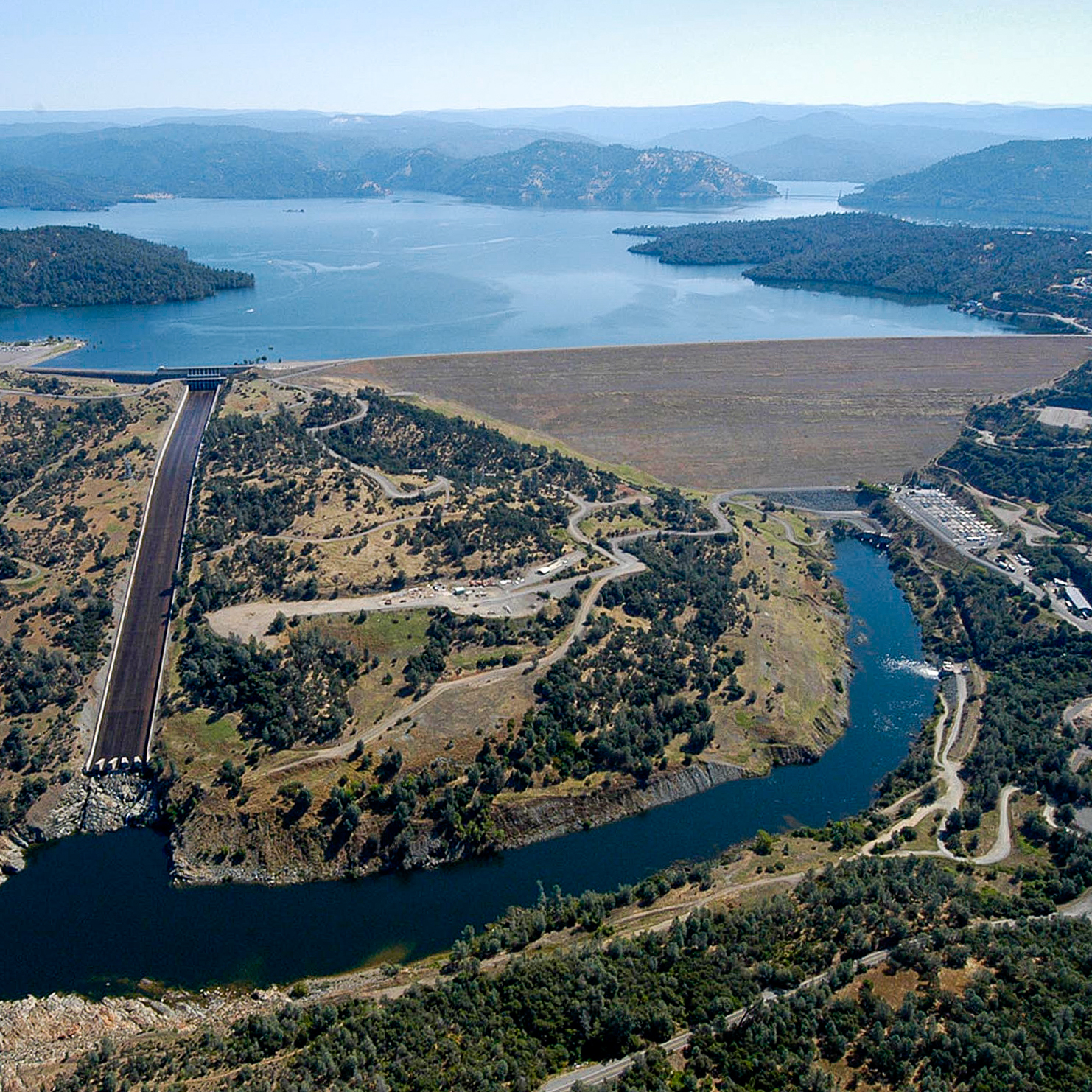
Aerial photo of Lake Oroville, Oroville Dam, the spillway, and the Feather River

The Oroville Dam is the tallest and largest dam in the United States. Completed in 1968, it stands 770 feet (230 m) high with a crest length (top of the dam) 6,920 feet (2,110 m) long. Over 80 million cubic yards of material were needed to build the Oroville Dam. There is enough material in the dam to build a two-lane highway around the Earth. Oroville Dam was named by the California Society of Professional Engineers as one of the seven wonders of engineering in California in 1967.

The dam's inner core is a thin layer made of clay material which resists seepage. Gold dredged tailings, sand & gravel left from the early 20th century gold rush dredging operations along the Feather River, make up the remainder of Oroville Dam. Beneath the dam a giant cavern almost as large as the State Capitol Building has been hollowed out to house six power generation units. Coupled with four additional units in the Thermalito Pumping–Generating Plant, they will generate more than 2.8 billion kilowatt-hours of energy annually.

=== Edward Hyatt Powerplant ===
39°32′01″N 121°29′07″W

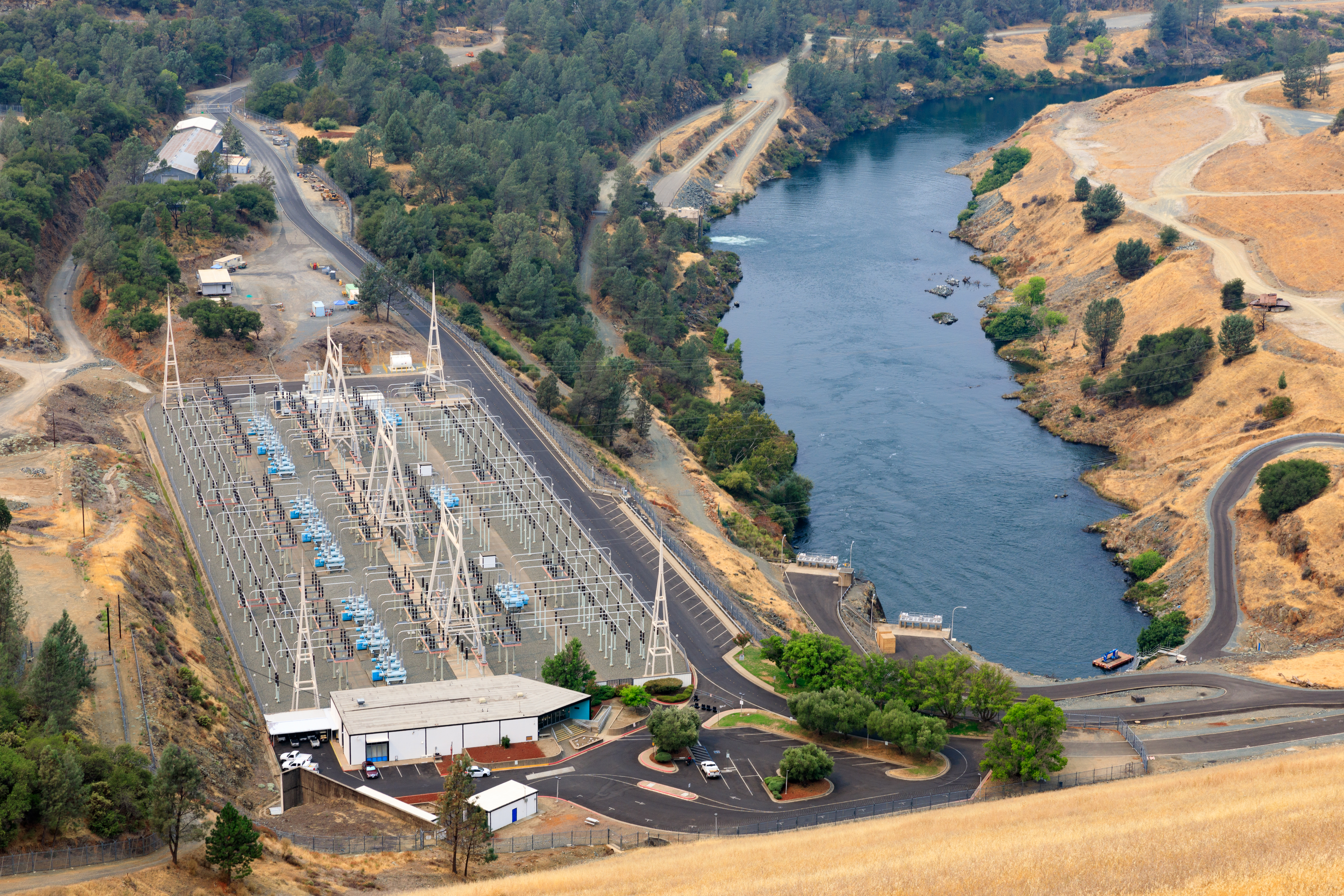
Edward Hyatt Powerplant at Oroville Dam on August 15, 2021. In early August 2021, the hydroelectric power plant was temporarily shut down due to low water levels in Lake Oroville caused by the drought in California.

Located in rock in the left abutment near the axis of Oroville Dam, the Edward Hyatt Powerplant is an underground, hydroelectric, pumping–generating facility. Construction of the plant began in 1964 (61 years ago) and was completed in 1967 (58 years ago).

Hyatt Powerplant maximizes power production through a pumped-storage operation where water, released for power in excess of local and downstream requirements, is returned to storage in Lake Oroville during off-peak periods and is used for generation during peak power demands. Water from the lake is conveyed to the units through penstocks and branch lines. After passing through the units, water is discharged through the draft tubes to one free surface and one full-flow tailrace tunnel.

The facility was named for Edward Hyatt, who was State Engineer (1927–1950) of the Division of Water Resources under the Department of Public Works. The Division was the predecessor to the Department of Water Resources.

=== Thermalito Diversion Pool ===
39°32′33″N 121°32′37″W

The Thermalito Diversion Pool, in tandem with the Diversion Dam, serves to create a tailwater pool for Hyatt Powerplant, just around the bend to the East, at the base of Oroville Dam. The diversion pool also acts as a forebay when Hyatt Powerplant is pumping water back into Lake Oroville, as well as provides recreation opportunities.

=== Thermalito Diversion Dam ===
39°31′43″N 121°32′41″W

Sitting at the South end of, (and impounding), the Diversion Pool reservoir, the Thermalito Diversion dam can either divert water west-ward into the Thermalito Power Canal for power generation at Thermalito Pumping–Generating Plant at the tail end of the Thermalito Forebay, or can release flow straight through, south, into the Feather River. The Diversion Dam is 143' feet tall and has a crest length of 1,300 feet (400 m).

=== Thermalito Diversion Dam Powerplant ===
39°31′44″N 121°32′48″W

The Thermalito Diversion Dam Powerplant is located at the Thermalito Diversion Dam below the left abutment of the dam. The powerplant generates electricity from water released to the Feather River to maintain fish habitat between the diversion dam and Thermalito Afterbay river outlet. It was constructed in 1985 (40 years ago) and was completed in 1987 (38 years ago). The powerplant has one generating unit with an installed capacity of 3.3 MW, and a maximum flow rate of 615 cu ft/s (17.4 m^{3}/s).

=== Thermalito Power Canal ===
39°31′52″N 121°33′55″W

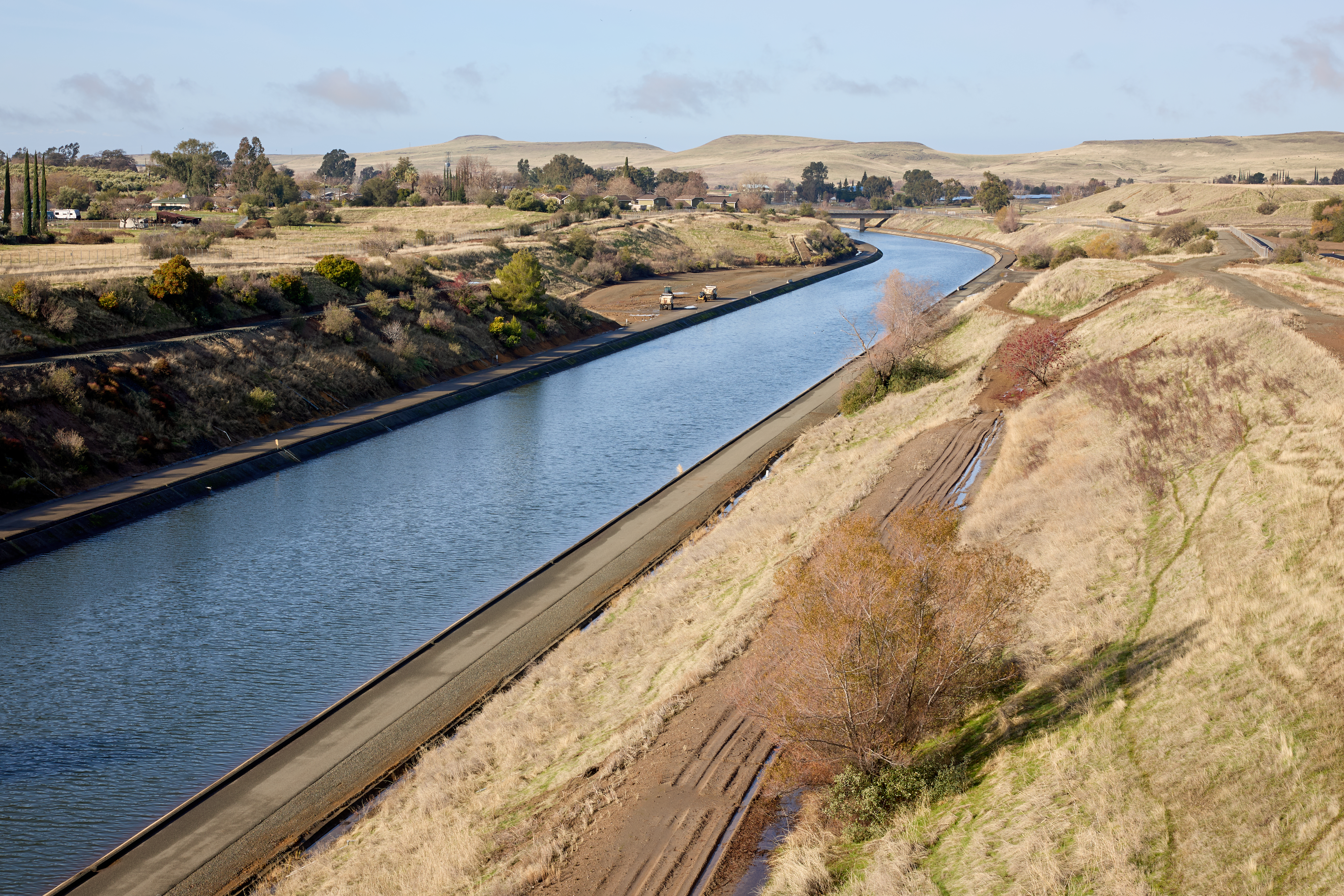
The Thermalito Power Canal in December 2024

The Thermalito Power Canal is a 10,000-foot-long (3,000 m) east–west oriented concrete lined canal that extends from a headworks structure, which is part of Thermalito Diversion Dam, to the Thermalito Forebay. It conveys water in either direction between Thermalito Diversion Dam and Thermalito Forebay for pumping and power generation at Hyatt Powerplant and Thermalito Pumping–Generating Plant. Construction on the canal began in 1965 (60 years ago) and was completed in 1967 (58 years ago). The Power Canal has a maximum generating flow of 16,900 cu ft/s (480 m^{3}/s) with a maximum pumping flow of 9,000 cu ft/s (250 m^{3}/s).

=== Thermalito Forebay ===
39°28′12″N 121°40′30″W

Thermalito Forebay is an offstream reservoir contained by the Thermalito Forebay Dam on the east and south and by Campbell Hills on the north and west. It is located about four miles (6 km) west of Oroville. The forebay conveys generating and pumping flows between Thermalito Power Canal and Thermalito Powerplant, provides regulatory storage and surge damping for the Hyatt–Thermalito power complex, and serves as a recreational area. The Thermalito Forebay has a maximum operating storage of 11,770 acre-feet (14,520,000 m^{3}), a water surface area of 630 acres (2.5 km^{2}) at maximum storage, and a shoreline of 10 miles (16 km) (at maximum operating storage). Construction on the Forebay began in 1965 (60 years ago) and was completed in 1968 (57 years ago).

=== Thermalito Pumping–Generating Plant ===
39°30′55″N 121°37′45″W

Thermalito Pumping–Generating Plant is a principal feature of the Oroville–Thermalito pumped storage power complex. A pumping–generating plant, the facility is operated in tandem with Thermalito Diversion Dam Powerplant and Hyatt Powerplant to produce power. Water released for power in excess of local and downstream requirements is conserved by pumpback operation during off-peak hours through both powerplants into Lake Oroville to be subsequently released for power generation during periods of peak power demand. The Plant has 4 units: 1 generating unit and 3 pumping–generating units, with an installed capacity of 120 MW, maximum flow rate of 17,400 cu ft/s (490 m^{3}/s).

Plant construction began in 1964 (61 years ago) and was completed in 1969 (56 years ago), operation started prior to completion, in 1968. In October 2011, the plant was renamed the Ronald B. Robie Thermalito Power Plant. On Thanksgiving, November 22, 2012, there was a major fire originating in a plant lower level cable tray that forced immediate shutdown. Completion of repairs and upgrades was expected for late 2018

=== Thermalito Afterbay ===
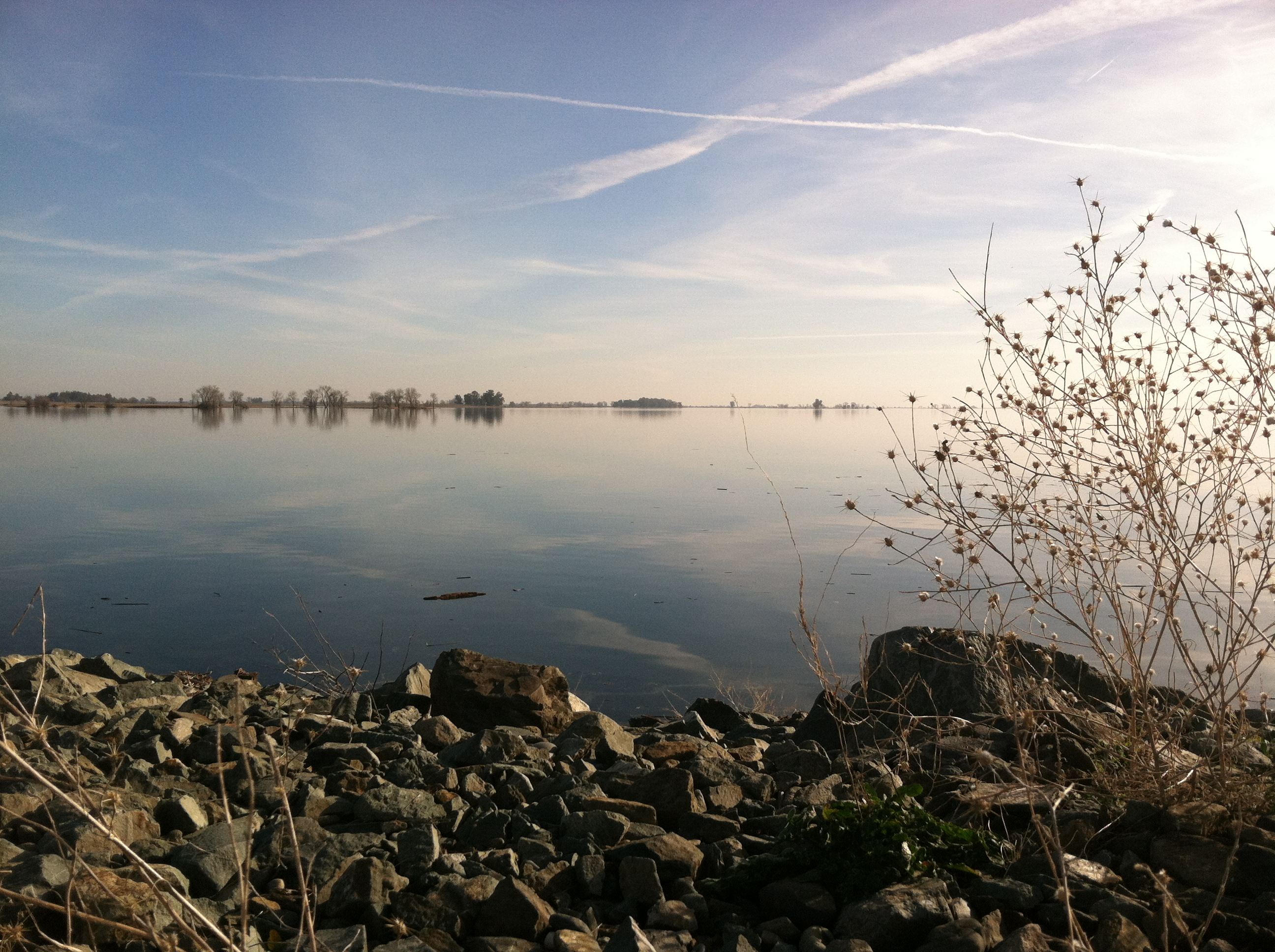
Part of the southern cut of Thermalito afterbay, off the Oroville wildlife area

39°30′55″N 121°37′45″W

The Thermalito Afterbay is a significantly larger reservoir than that of the Forebay, and sits just 2 miles (3.2 km) southwest of the tail end of the Forebay, with only a 9,100-foot-long (2,800 m) canal connecting them. The Afterbay provides storage for the water required by the pumpback operation to Lake Oroville, helps regulate the power system, produces controlled flow in the Feather River downstream from the Oroville–Thermalito facilities, and provides recreation to the area. It also serves as a warming basin for agricultural water delivery to the numerous rice and grain fields just west of the Afterbay. The Afterbay has a maximum operating storage of 57,040 acre-feet (70,360,000 m^{3}), a water surface area of 4,300 acres (17 km^{2}) at max. storage, and a shoreline of 26 miles (at max. operating storage). Thermalito Afterbay Dam, at 42,000 feet (13,000 m) long, is the longest crest in the California State Water Project system. Construction on the Afterbay began in 1965 (60 years ago) and was completed in 1968 (57 years ago).

=== Fish-barrier dam ===
39°31′13″N 121°32′51″W

The barrier dam, located right next to and just upstream of the Feather River Fish Hatchery, serves to divert fish away from the mainstream and into a fish ladder that leads to the hatchery. Flows at the barrier dam are controlled by releases at the Oroville Dam spillway and Thermalito Diversion Dam. The barrier dam prevents the fish from entering the lake and guides them to the fish ladder. The barrier dam is 91 feet (28 m) tall and has a crest length of 600 feet (180 m). The dam was constructed in 1962 (63 years ago) and completed in 1964 (61 years ago).

=== Feather River Fish Hatchery ===
39°31′04″N 121°33′15″W

The Feather River Fish Hatchery was built to compensate for spawning grounds lost to returning salmon and Steelhead trout with the construction of Oroville Dam in the early 1960s. Salmon and steelhead raised at the hatchery are transported in oxygenated, temperature-controlled tanks and released in the Feather and Sacramento Rivers, Lake Oroville, and/or in the Delta near the San Francisco Bay area. These fish account for an estimated 20 percent of the ocean sport and commercial catch in the Pacific Ocean. Hatchery salmon are also planted in Lake Oroville. The first salmon and steelhead entered the hatchery in September 1967. Today, the facility accommodates an average 8,000 fish. The Feather River Fish Hatchery was constructed between 1966 (59 years ago) and 1967 (58 years ago)

== See also ==
- California Department of Water Resources (DWR)
- Oroville Dam
- California State Water Project
- Feather River
- Lake Oroville
- List of dams and reservoirs in California
