= Oroville Dam =

Dam in California

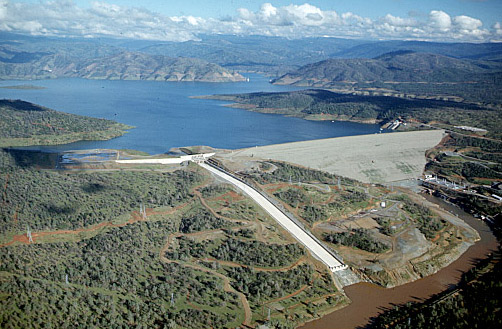

- Oroville Dam Oroville Dam (the United States)
- Country: United States
- Location: Oroville, California
- Coordinates: 39°32′20″N 121°29′08″W
- Purpose: Water supply, flood control, power
- Status: Operational
- Construction began: 1961; 65 years ago
- Opening date: May 4, 1968; 58 years ago
- Owner: California Department of Water Resources

Dam and spillways
- Type of dam: Zoned Earthfill
- Impounds: Feather River
- Height (foundation): 770 ft (235 m)
- Length: 6,920 ft (2,109 m)
- Dam volume: 77,619,000 yd^{3} (59,344,000 m^{3})
- Spillway type: Service, 8× gate-controlled
- Spillway capacity: 150,000 cu ft/s (4,200 m^{3}/s) (service)

Reservoir
- Creates: Lake Oroville
- Total capacity: 3,537,577 acre⋅ft (4.363537 km^{3})
- Inactive capacity: 29,600 acre⋅ft (0.0365 km^{3})
- Catchment area: 3,607 mi^{2} (9,340 km^{2})
- Surface area: 15,805 acres (6,396 ha)
- Normal elevation: 901 ft (275 m) (spillway crest)

Power Station
- Hydraulic head: 615 ft (187 m)
- Turbines: 3 × 132 MW conventional; 3 × 141 MW pump-generators
- Installed capacity: 819 MW
- Capacity factor: 21%
- Annual generation: 1,629 GWh (2001–2012)
- Website water.ca.gov/Programs/State-Water-Project/SWP-Facilities/Oroville

Oroville Dam is an earthfill embankment dam on the Feather River east of the city of Oroville, California, in the Sierra Nevada foothills east of the Sacramento Valley. At 770 feet (235 m) high, it is the tallest dam in the U.S. and serves mainly for water supply, hydroelectricity generation, and flood control. The dam impounds Lake Oroville, the second-largest reservoir in California, capable of storing more than 3.5 million acre-feet (1.1×10^{12} US gal; 4.3×10^{9} m^{3}).

Built by the California Department of Water Resources, Oroville Dam is one of the key features of the California State Water Project (SWP), one of two major projects passed that set up California's statewide water system. Construction was initiated in 1961, and despite numerous difficulties encountered during its construction, including multiple floods and a major train wreck on the rail line used to transport materials to the dam site, the embankment was topped out in 1967 and the entire project was ready for use in 1968. The dam began to generate electricity shortly afterwards with completion of the Edward Hyatt Power Plant, then the country's largest underground power station.

Since its completion in 1968, the Oroville Dam has allocated the flow of the Feather River from the Sacramento-San Joaquin Delta into the SWP's California Aqueduct, which provides a major supply of water for irrigation in the San Joaquin Valley, as well as municipal and industrial water supplies to coastal Southern California, and has prevented large amounts of flood damage to the area—more than $1.3 billion between 1987 and 1999. The dam stops fish migration up the Feather River and controlled the flow of the river; as a result, the Oroville Dam has affected riparian habitat. Multiple attempts at trying to counter the dam's impacts on fish migration have included the construction of a salmon/steelhead fish hatchery on the river, which began shortly after the dam was completed.

In February 2017, the main and emergency spillways threatened to fail, leading to the evacuation of 188,000 people living near the dam. After deterioration of the main spillway largely stabilized and the water level of the dam's reservoir dropped below the top of the emergency spillway, the evacuation order was lifted.

The main spillway was reconstructed by November 1, 2018, and water releases were successfully tested, up to 25,000 cu ft/s (710 m^{3}/s), during April 2019.

== History ==
=== Planning ===
In 1935, work began on the Central Valley Project, a federal water project that would develop the Sacramento and San Joaquin River systems for irrigation of the highly fertile Central Valley. However, after the end of World War II in 1945, the state experienced an economic boom that led to rapid urban and commercial growth in the central and southern portions of the state, and it became clear that California's economy could not depend solely on a state water system geared primarily towards agriculture. A new study of California's water supplies by the Division of Water Resources (now California Department of Water Resources, DWR) was carried out under an act of the California State Legislature in 1945.

In 1951, California State Engineer A. D. Edmonston proposed the Feather River Project, the direct predecessor to the SWP, which included a major dam on the Feather River at Oroville, and aqueducts and pumping plants to transfer stored water to destinations in central and southern California. The proposed project was strongly opposed by voters in Northern California and parts of Southern California that received water from the Colorado River, but was supported by other Southern Californians and San Joaquin Valley farmers. However, major flooding in the 1950s prompted the 1957 passage of an emergency flood-control bill that provided sufficient funding for construction for a dam at Oroville – regardless of whether it would become part of the SWP.

=== Construction ===
Groundbreaking on the dam site occurred in May 1957 with the relocation of the Western Pacific Railroad tracks that ran through the Feather River Canyon. The Burns-Porter Act of the California Legislature, which authorized the SWP, was not passed until November 8, 1960, and only by a slim margin. Engineer Donald Thayer of the DWR was commissioned to design and head construction of Oroville Dam, and the primary work contract was awarded to Oro Dam Constructors Inc., a joint venture led by Oman Construction Co.

Two concrete-lined diversion tunnels, each 4,400 ft (1,341 m) long and 35 ft (11 m) in diameter, were excavated to channel the Feather River around the dam site. One of the tunnels was located at river level and was to carry normal water flows, while the second one was only to be used during floods. In May 1963, workers poured the last of 252,000 yd^{3} (6.8 million cu ft; 193,000 m^{3}) of concrete that comprised the 128 ft (39 m) high cofferdam, to protect the construction site from floods. This structure later served as an impervious core for the completed dam. With the cofferdam in place, an 11-mile (18 km) rail line was constructed to move earth and rock to the dam site. An average of 120 train cars ran along the line each hour, transporting fill that was mainly excavated from enormous piles of hydraulic mining debris that was washed down by the Feather River after the California Gold Rush.

On December 22, 1964, disaster nearly struck when the Feather River, after days of heavy rain, reached a peak flow of 250,000 cu ft/s (7,100 m^{3}/s) above the Oroville Dam site. The water rose behind the partially completed embankment dam and nearly overtopped it, while a maximum of 157,000 cu ft/s (4,400 m^{3}/s) poured from the diversion tunnels. This Christmas flood of 1964 was one of the most disastrous floods on record in Northern California, but the incomplete dam was able to reduce the peak flow of the Feather River by nearly 40%, averting massive damage to the area.

Ten months later, four men died in a tragic accident on the construction rail line. On October 7, 1965, two 40-car work trains, one fully loaded and the other empty, collided head-on at a tunnel entrance, igniting 10,000 US gallons (38,000 L) of diesel fuel, completely destroying two locomotives. The burning fuel from the collision started a forest fire that burned 100 acres (40 ha) before it could be extinguished. The crash delayed construction of the dam by a week while the train wreckage was cleared. Overall, 34 men died in the construction of the dam.

Oroville Dam was designed to withstand the strongest possible earthquake for the region, and was fitted with hundreds of instruments that serve to measure water pressure and settlement of the earth fill used in its construction, earning it the nickname "the dam that talks back". (A M_{L} 5.7 earthquake in the Oroville area in 1975 is believed to have been caused by induced seismicity from the weight of the Oroville Dam and reservoir on a local fault line.) The embankment was finally topped out on October 6, 1967, with the last of 155 million short tons (140.6 million tonnes) of material that took over 40,000 train trips to transport. On May 4, 1968, Oroville Dam was officially dedicated by the state of California. Among the notable figures present were California governor Ronald Reagan, who spoke, Chief Justice (formerly California governor) Earl Warren, Senator Thomas Kuchel, and California Representative Harold T. "Bizz" Johnson. The dedication was accompanied by a week of festivities in nearby Oroville, attended by nearly 50,000 people.

=== 2005 dam relicensing ===
On October 17, 2005, three environmental groups filed a motion with the Federal Energy Regulatory Commission (FERC) urging federal officials to require that the dam's emergency spillway be armored with concrete, rather than remain as an earthen spillway, as it did not meet modern safety standards. "In the event of extreme rain and flooding, fast-rising water would overwhelm the main concrete spillway, then flow down the emergency spillway, and that could cause heavy erosion that would create flooding for communities downstream, but also could cause a failure, known as 'loss of crest control'." FERC water agencies responsible for the cost of the upgrades said this was unnecessary and that concerns were overblown.

In 2006, a senior civil engineer sent a memorandum to his managers stating, "The emergency spillway meets FERC's engineering guidelines for an emergency spillway", and "The guidelines specify that during a rare flood event, it is acceptable for the emergency spillway to sustain significant damage."

=== 2009 river valve accident ===
At around 7:30 am on July 22, 2009, several workers were deep below the reservoir operating flow controls to test a river valve chamber in the Oroville Dam. When the flow reached 85%, suction pulled a breakaway wall downstream into a 35-foot (11 m) diversion tunnel, cutting lights and nearly sending three workers to their deaths in the roaring current.

One of the workers who was badly injured survived by clinging to a bent rail, where he was struck by tools and equipment being sucked into the tunnel. He was hospitalized for four days with head trauma, a broken leg and arm, cuts, and bruises.

The California Division of the Occupational Health and Safety Administration (Cal OSHA) concluded opening the valves without an energy-dispersion ring, which reportedly was absent, "created water flow with such great turbulence that it blocked an air vent and created a vacuum". It sanctioned the DWR with six citations, including five classified as serious, and the department was initially fined $141,375. Two of the "serious" citations were overturned on appeal.

This river valve system was one of the first parts of the dam to be built when the dam project started in 1961, because its initial purpose was to divert the river while the dam was under construction. After that, it served various purposes, including as a possible emergency release valve. Since the accident, DWR had implemented a standing order that prohibited the operation of the river outlet system and significantly limited access to the river valve chamber. Following the accident, DWR entered into a 2012 agreement with Cal OSHA to hire a third-party expert to improve the safety of the river valve outlet system (RVOS) and make it operational again. In 2014, DWR embarked on an accelerated refurbishment program to respond to concerns about operational needs during the ongoing drought. The system was mostly refurbished and was used during 2014 and 2015 to meet Endangered Species Act temperature requirements for the Feather River. Some additional refurbishments were being made to portions of the RVOS and were expected to conclude in early 2017.

=== 2013, 2015 spillway cracks and inspection ===
The spillway cracked in 2013. A senior civil engineer with the DWR was interviewed by the Sacramento Bee, and explained, "It’s common for spillways to develop a void because of the drainage systems under them", and "There were some patches needed and so we made repairs and everything checked out."

In July 2015, the state Division of Safety of Dams inspected the dam spillway visually "from some distance" and did not walk it.

== 2017 spillway failure ==
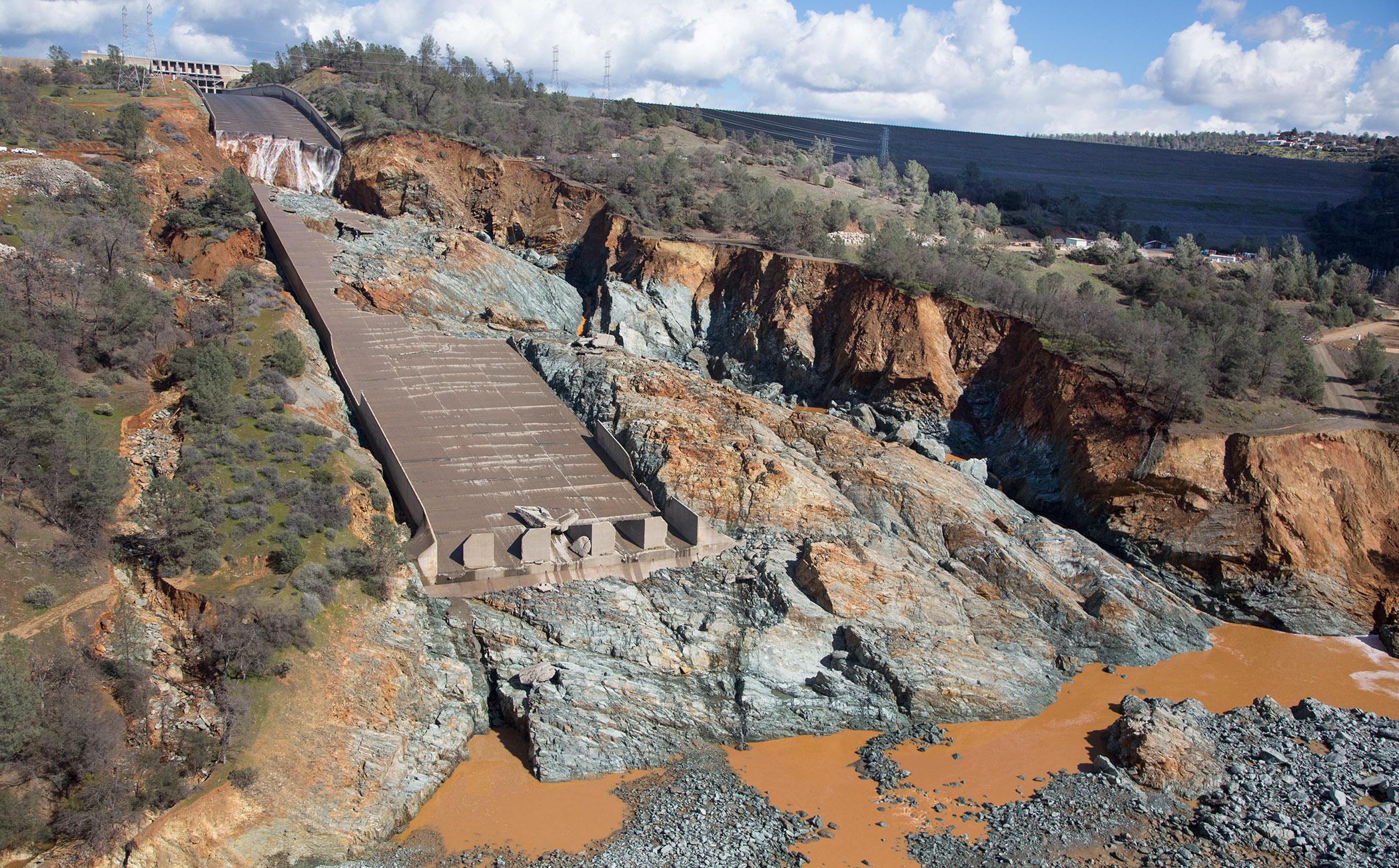
Oroville Dam spillway damage, February 27, 2017

=== Initial spillway damage ===
The rainy season of 2016–2017 was Northern California's wettest winter in over 100 years. Heavy rainfall resulted in record inflows from the Feather River, and the spillway was opened in January to relieve pressure on Oroville Dam. After a second series of heavy storms in February, the spillway flow was increased to 50,000 cu ft/s (1,400 m^{3}/s), and on February 7, DWR employees noticed an unusual flow pattern. This halted spillway outflow, and DWR brought engineers onto the spillway to inspect its integrity. The engineers found a large area of concrete and foundation erosion. This erosion feature was too massive to repair without diverting water to the emergency spillway, and halted outflow along the main spillway for a period to fix the hole. High inflows to Lake Oroville forced dam operators to continue using the damaged spillway, causing additional damage. The spillway hole continued to grow. Debris from the crater in the main spillway was carried downstream, and caused damage to the Feather River Fish Hatchery due to high turbidity.

Although engineers had hoped that using the damaged spillway could drain the lake enough to avoid use of the emergency spillway, they were forced to reduce its discharge from 65,000 cu ft/s (1,800 m^{3}/s) to 55,000 cu ft/s (1,600 m^{3}/s) due to potential damage to nearby power lines.

=== Emergency spillway use and evacuation ===
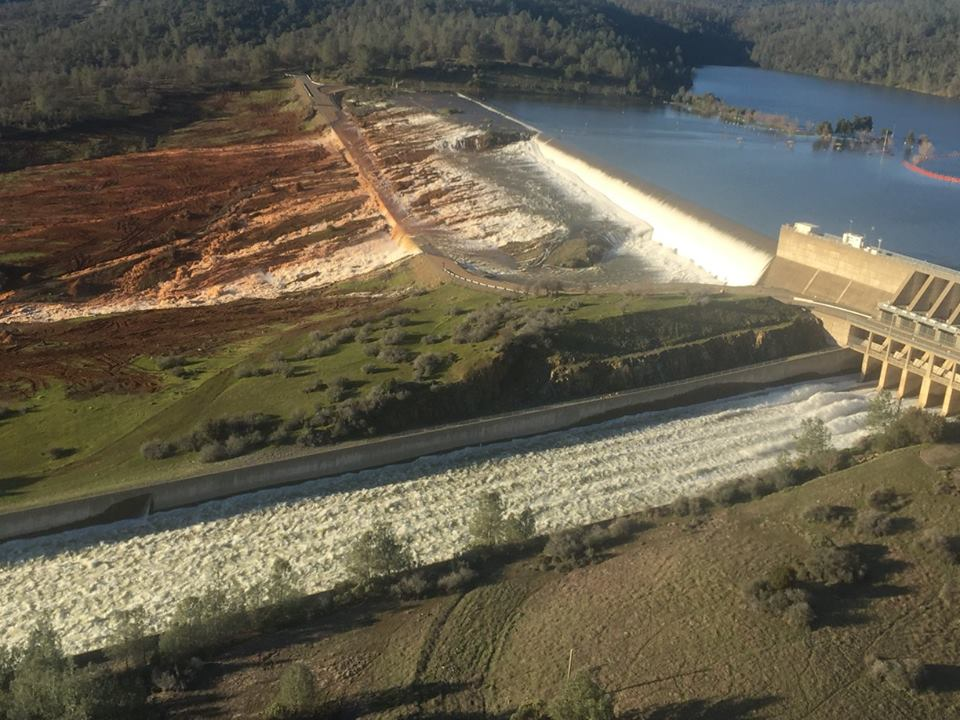
Water overflowed the parking lot past the emergency spillway (in the background), while water continued to flow through the main spillway (in the foreground), on February 11.

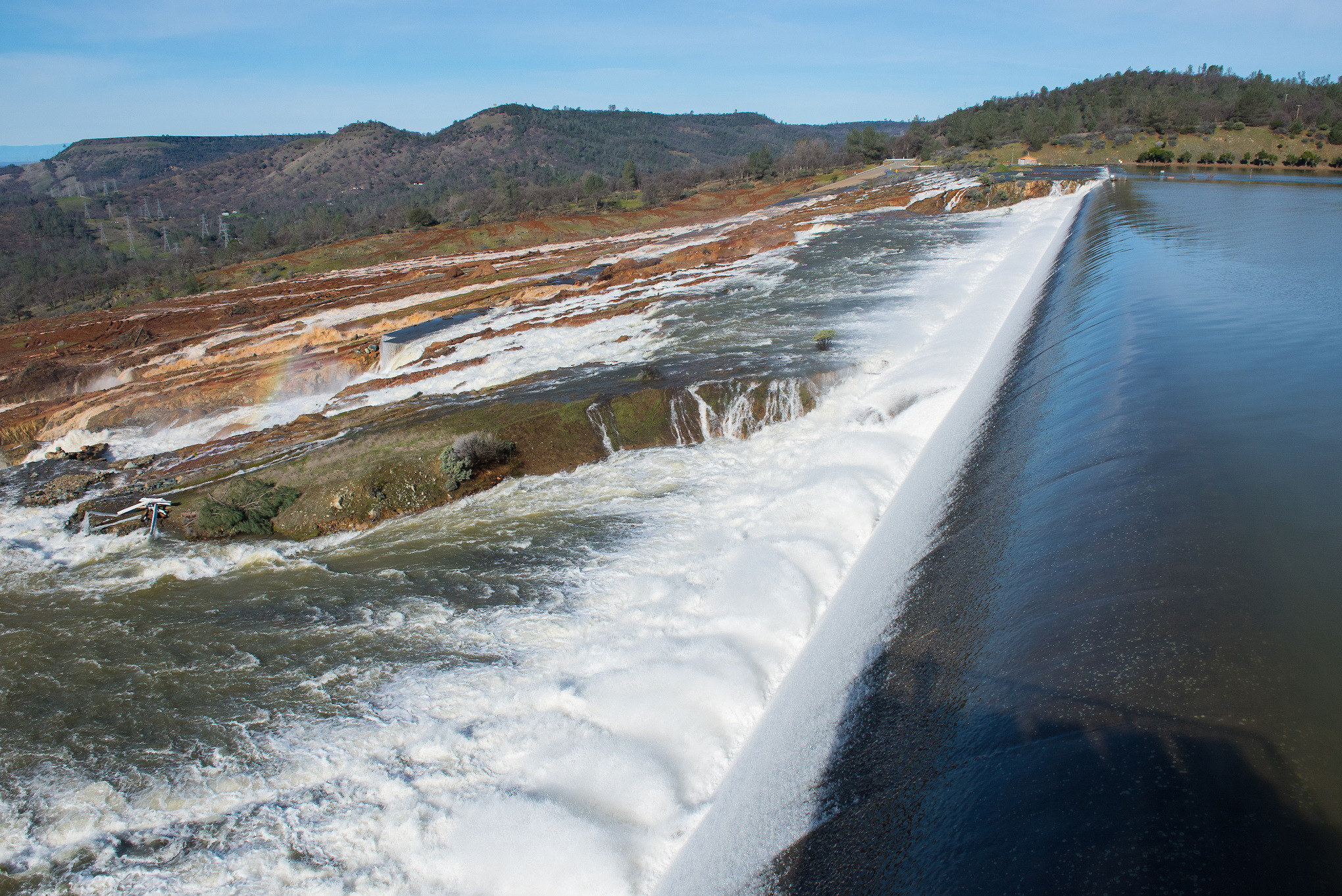
Water from the Oroville Dam flows over the emergency spillway on Sunday, February 12

Shortly after 8:00 pm on February 11, 2017, the emergency spillway began carrying water for the first time since the dam's construction in 1968. The water flowed directly onto the earthen hillside below the emergency spillway, as designed. However, headward erosion of the emergency spillway threatened to undermine and collapse the concrete weir.

On February 12, an evacuation was ordered for low-lying areas, due to possible failure of the emergency spillway. The flow over the main spillway was increased to 100,000 cu ft/s (2,800 m^{3}/s) to try to slow erosion of the emergency spillway.

By 8:00 pm on the evening of February 12, the increased flow had lowered the water level, causing the emergency spillway to stop overflowing. On February 14, the sheriff of Butte County lifted the mandatory evacuation order.

=== Investigation and reconstruction ===
On May 19, 2017, the spillway was shut down for the summer, to allow demolition and repair work to begin. The total cost of the repair was projected to exceed $400 million, with the $275 million primary contract awarded to Kiewit Construction. FEMA was expected to cover a large portion of the expenses.

According to an independent forensics team led by John France, the exact cause of the spillway failure remains uncertain, though they identified "24 possible causes for the spillway failure, including a faulty drainage system, variations in concrete thickness, and corrosion in the structure's rebar".

For 2018 the DWR planned to demolish and reconstruct the portion of the spillway which was undamaged by the flood, but which also has been identified as structurally defective. In addition, crews worked to extend a cutoff wall under the emergency spillway to prevent erosion should that structure be used again in the future.

On November 1, 2017, DWR director Grant Davis said, "Lake Oroville's main spillway is indeed ready to safely handle winter flows if needed". While this completes phase 1 of the construction, there remained a phase 2 to be completed in 2018. The second phase would include rebuilding the top section of the spillway (which was not rebuilt this season), putting slabs over the roller compacted concrete section, and constructing a concrete secant cutoff wall for the emergency spillway. The cost estimate at this point is over $500 million. In October 2017, hairline cracks were found in the rebuilt spillway. Things that added to the cost included relocating power lines, dredging the river downstream of the dam, as well as the discovery that the bedrock under the spillway was weak, necessitating deeper excavations and more concrete.

The DWR commissioned an independent board of consultants (BOC) to review and comment on repairs to Oroville Dam. Memoranda (reports) prepared by the BOC are posted at the DWR web site. The independent forensic team (IFT) was selected to determine the cause of the spillways incident, including effects of operations, management, structural design and geological conditions.

Progression of spillway conditions, Sentinel-2 true-color satellite images
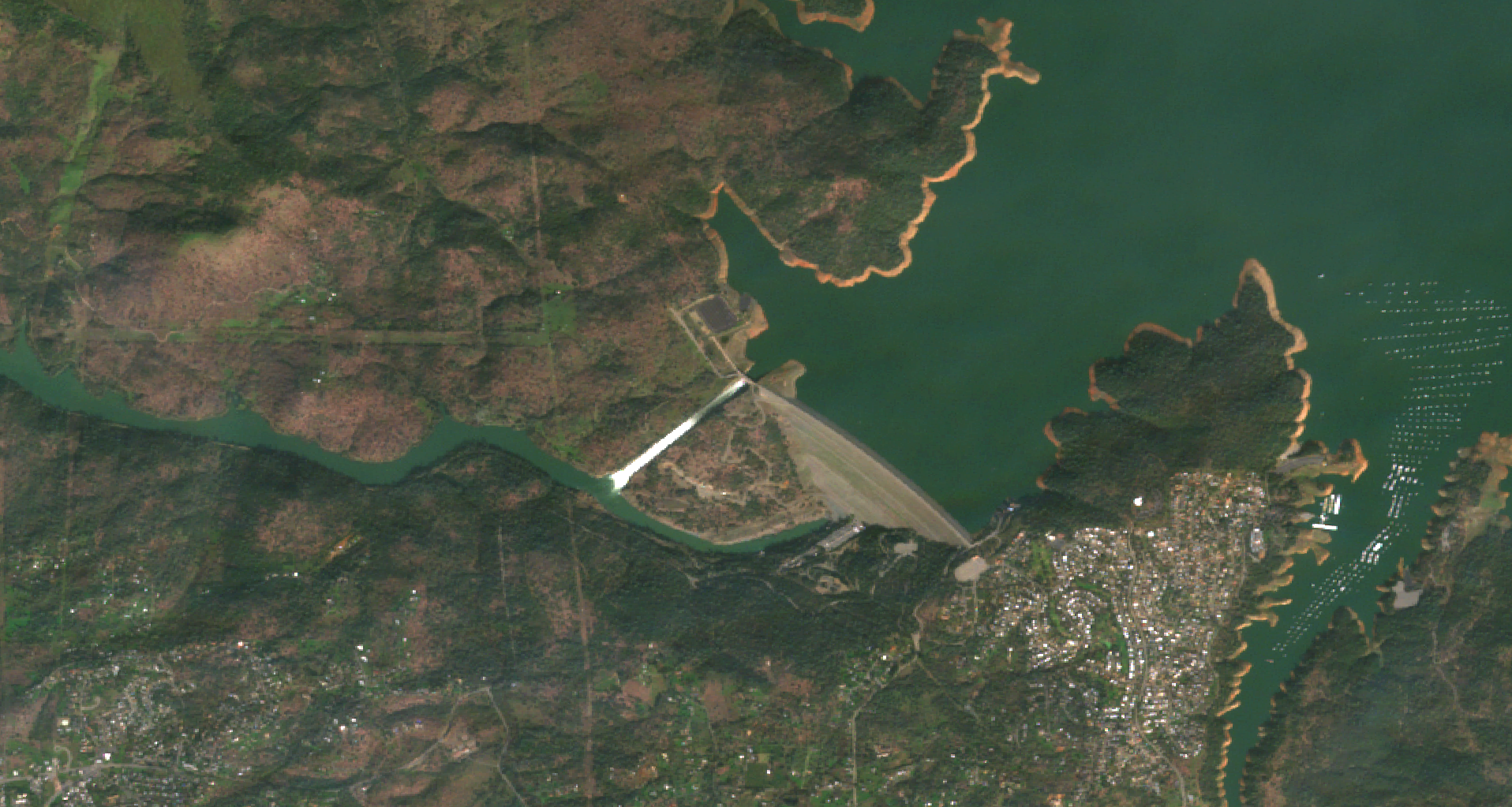
January 30, 2017, before spillways failed

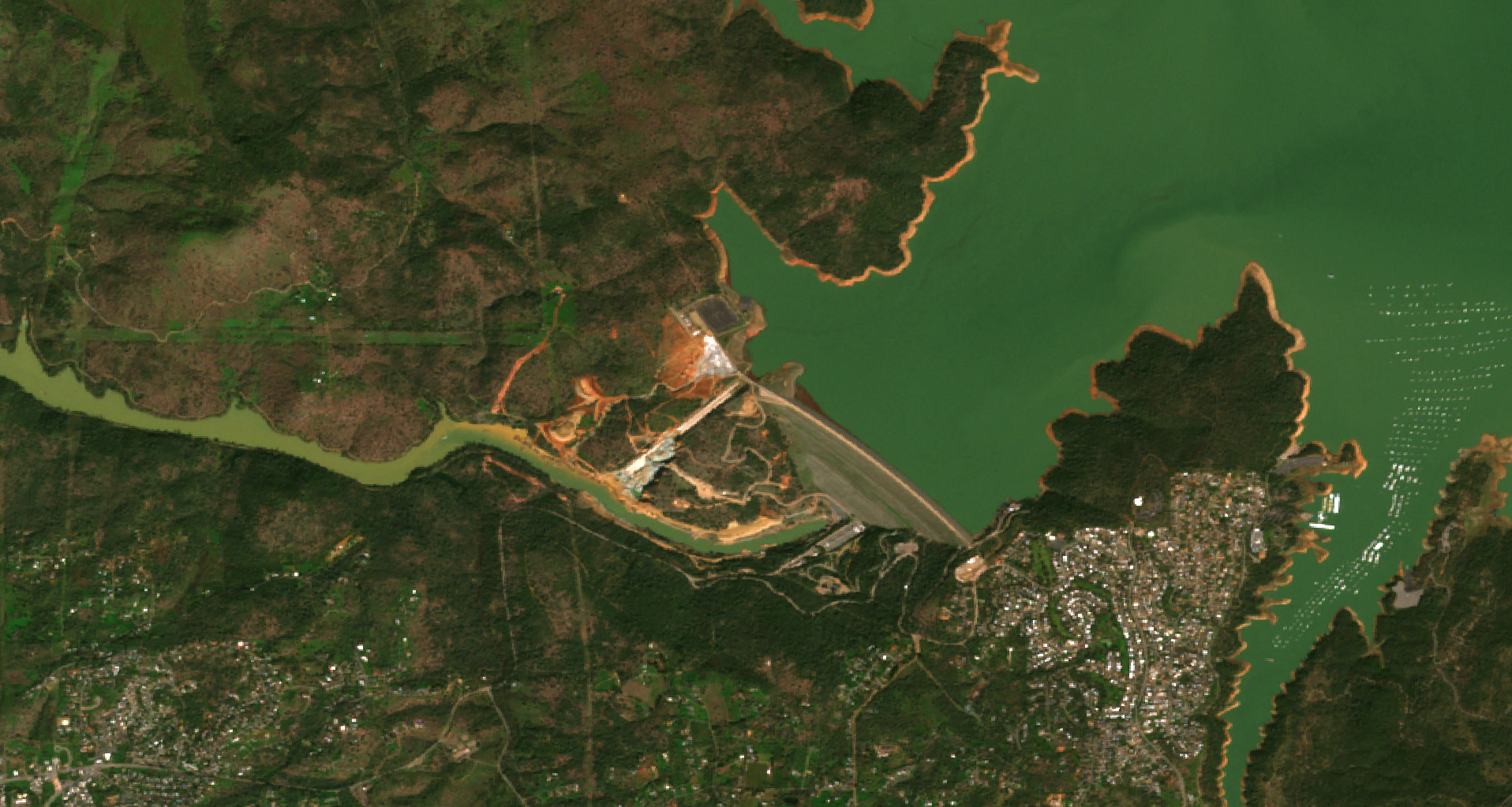
March 11, 2017, after spillways failed

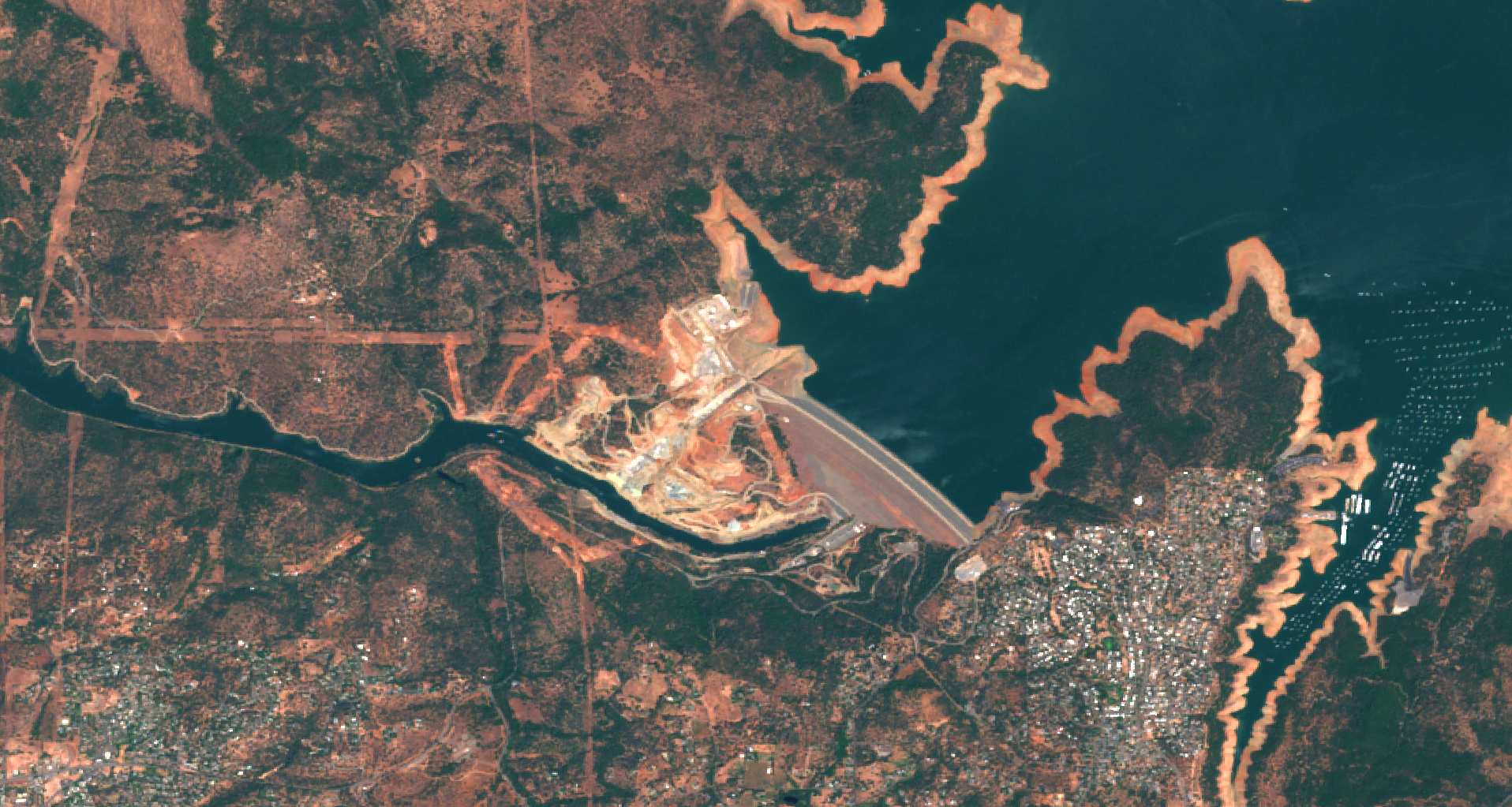
July 29, 2017, construction progress

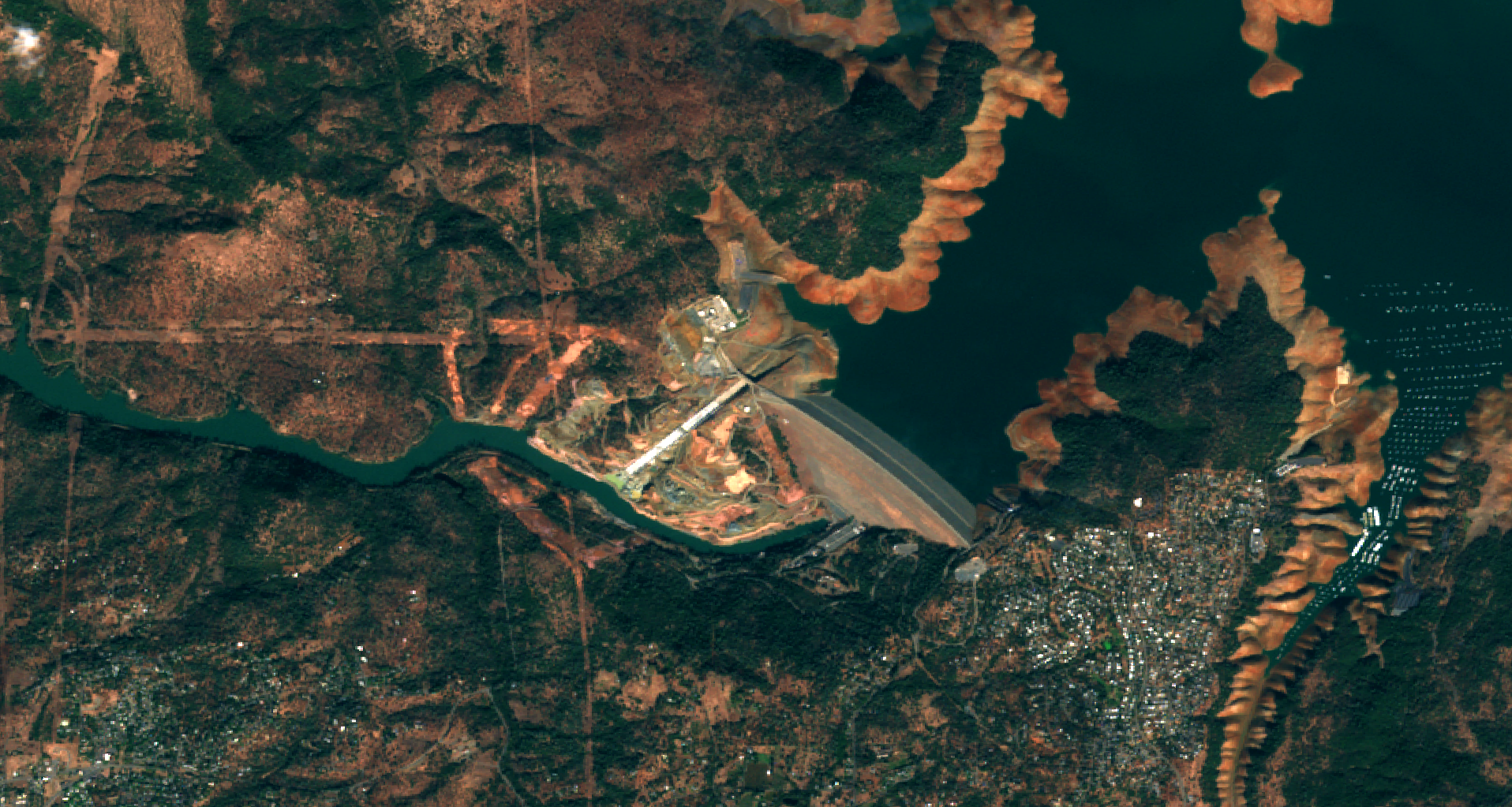
November 6, 2017, construction progress

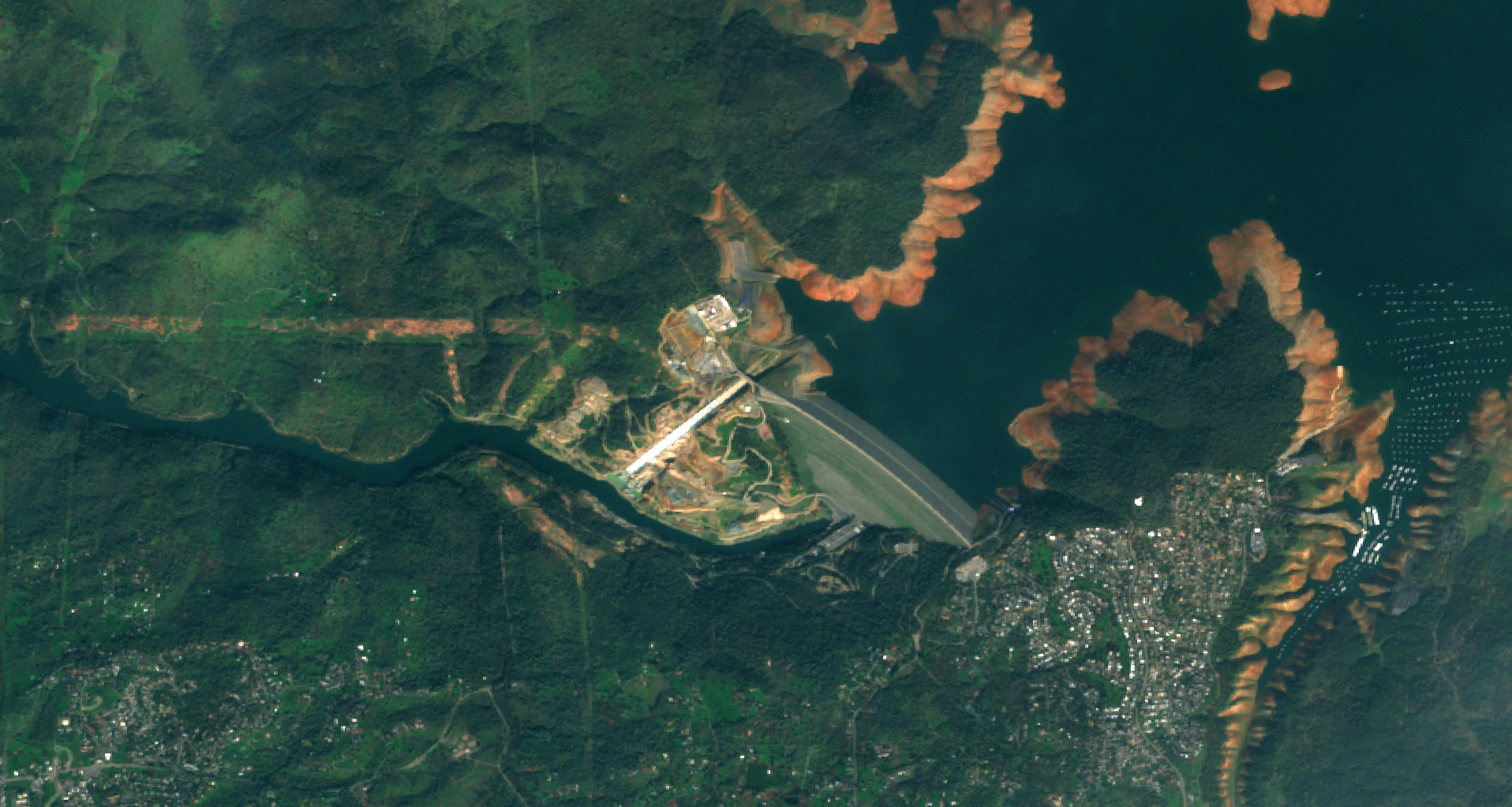
January 30, 2018, construction progress

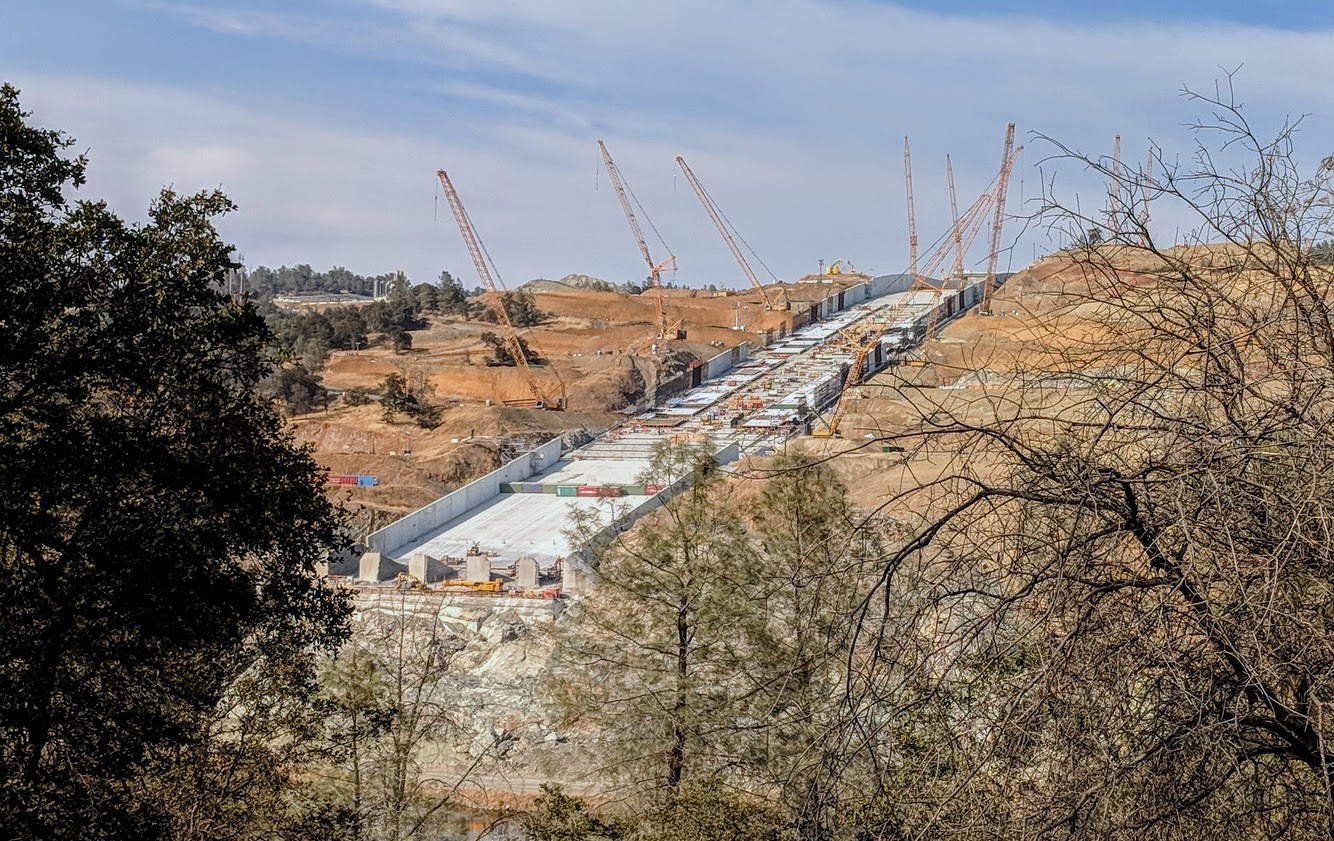
The Oroville Dam main spillway on August 5, 2018, during phase-two repairs

According to its 2017–18 operations plan, the DWR maintained Lake Oroville at a lower-than-normal level to reduce the possibility that the spillway would have to be used the following winter.

In a second phase of spillway repairs in 2018–19, temporary repairs on the main spillway done during phase one were being torn out and replaced with steel-reinforced structural concrete.

On April 2, 2019, due to heavy rainfall upstream, the DWR began releasing water over the newly reconstructed spillway at a rate of 8,300 cubic feet per second (240 m^{3}/s). Releases were increased to 25,000 cubic feet per second (710 m^{3}/s) on April 7 to test how the spillway performed in higher flows. They were decreased to 15,000 cubic feet per second (420 m^{3}/s) on April 9.

==== 2020 Safety assessment ====
The DWR released an assessment, dated October 1, 2020, concluding that Oroville Dam was suitable for continued safe and reliable operation.

Meanwhile, the Federal Energy Regulatory Commission has demanded that California submit a plan by September 2022, for addressing the issue of greater amounts of rain predicted in the future.

== 2020–21 drought ==
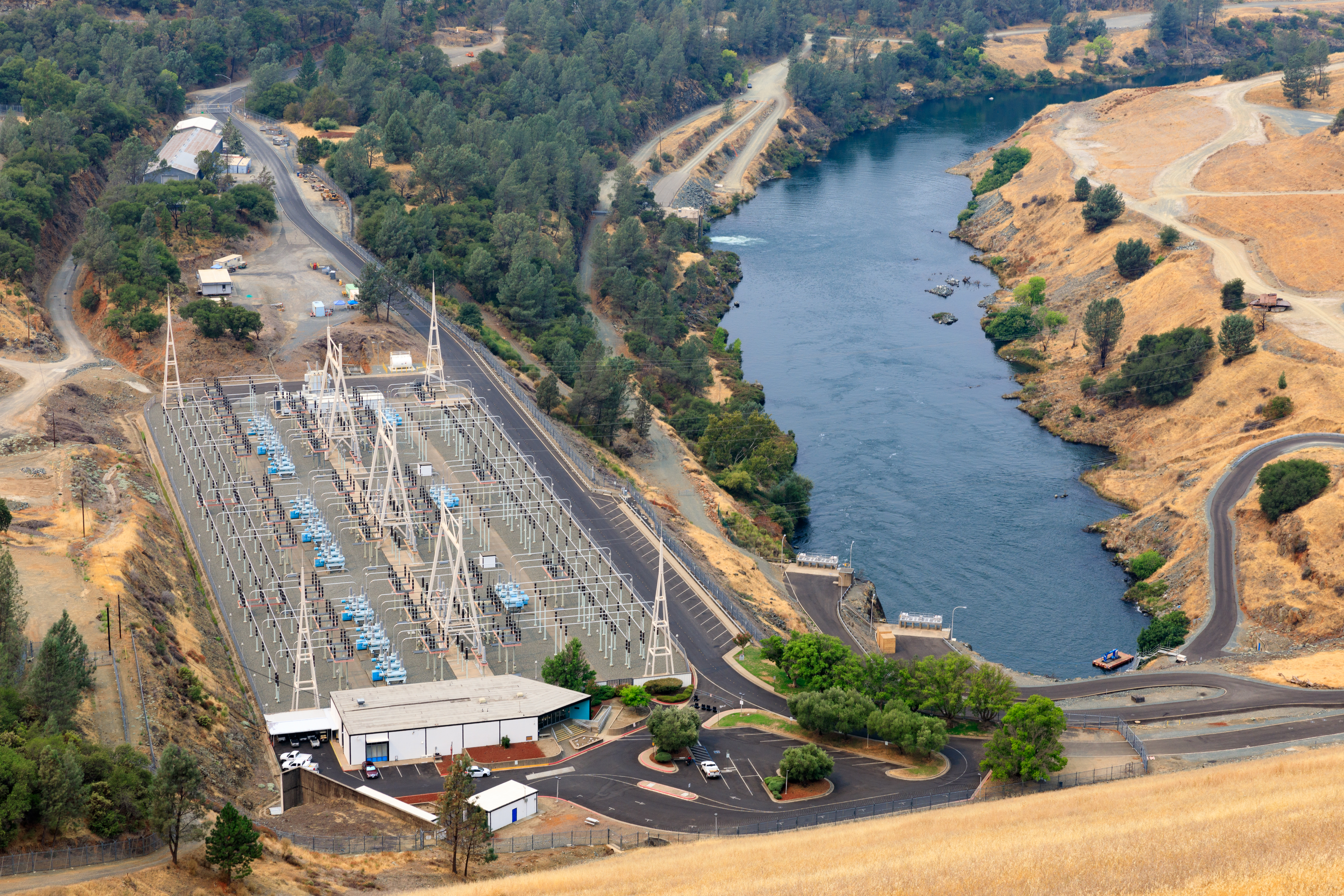
Edward Hyatt Powerplant at Oroville Dam on August 15, 2021: In early August 2021, the hydroelectric power plant was shut down due to low water levels in Lake Oroville caused by the drought in California.

Due to the low precipitation in the catchment area, water levels were below normal beginning in 2020. In August 2021, the Hyatt power plant had to be shut down because the water level fell below its water inlets. After falling to a record low of 22% capacity by September 30, winter storms increased the lake level by December and the plant was restarted on January 4, 2022.

== Operations ==
=== Hydroelectricity ===
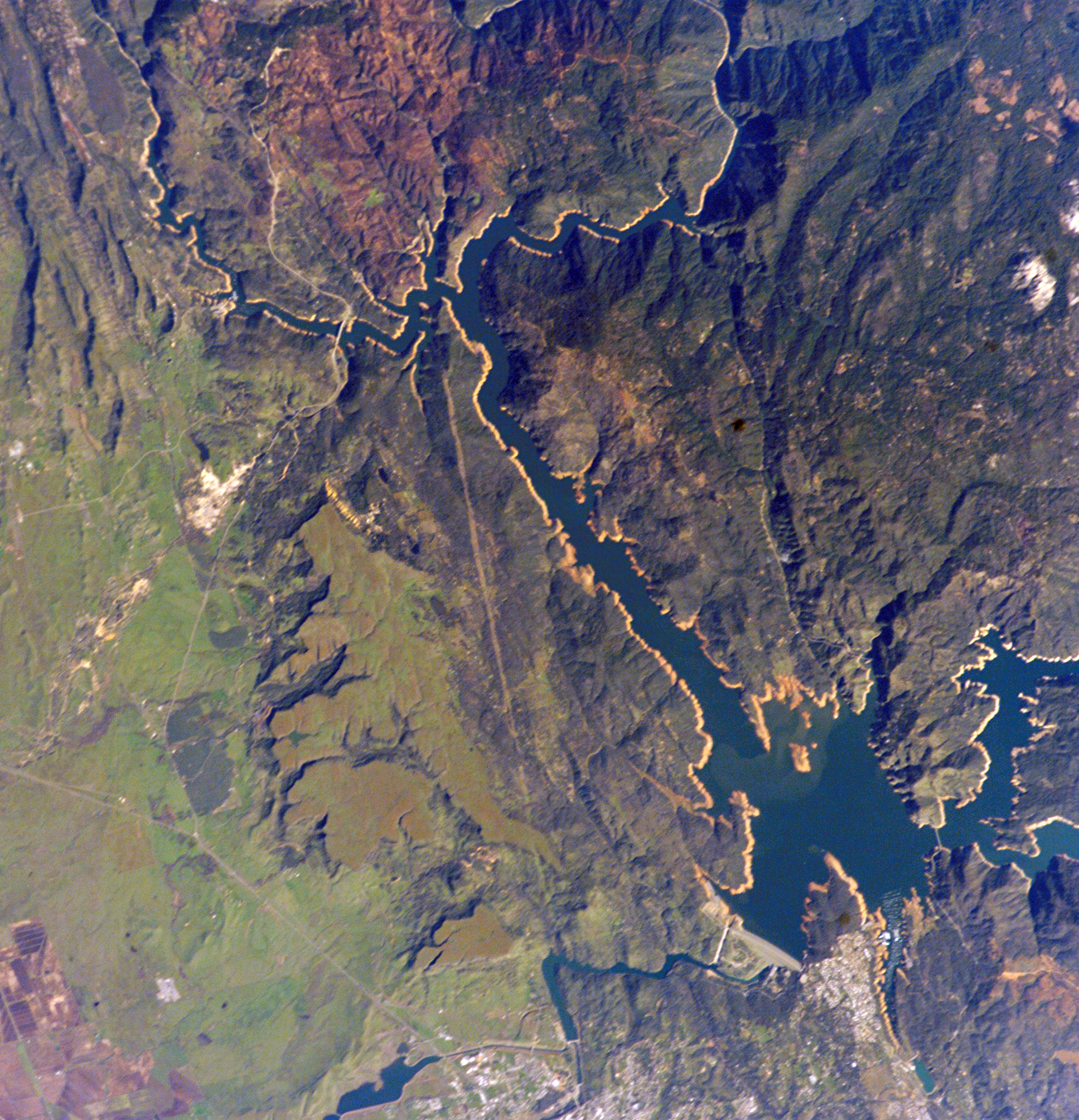
Satellite view showing Lake Oroville (right), Oroville Dam (bottom center), and Thermalito Forebay (bottom left)

Construction of the underground Edward Hyatt Pump-Generating Plant was finished shortly after the completion of Oroville Dam. At the time, it was the largest underground power station in the United States, with three 132-megawatt (MW) conventional turbines and three 141 MW pump-generators for a total installed capacity of 819 MW. The Hyatt Powerplant is capable of pumping water back into Lake Oroville when surplus power is available. The pump-generators at Hyatt can lift up to 5,610 cubic feet per second (159 m^{3}/s) into Lake Oroville (with a net consumption of 519 MW), while the six turbines combined use a flow of 16,950 cu ft/s (480 m^{3}/s) at maximum generation.

Since 1969, the Hyatt plant has worked in tandem with an extensive pumped-storage operation comprising two offstream reservoirs west of Oroville. These two facilities are collectively known as the Oroville–Thermalito Complex. Water is diverted into the upper Thermalito reservoir (Thermalito Forebay) via the Thermalito Diversion Dam on the Feather River. During periods of off-peak power use, surplus energy generated at Hyatt is used to lift water from Thermalito's lower reservoir (the Thermalito Afterbay) to the forebay, which releases water back into the afterbay to generate up to 114 MW of power at times of high demand. The Hyatt and Thermalito plants produce an average of 2,200 gigawatt hours (GWh) of electricity each year, about half of the total power produced by the SWP's eight hydroelectric facilities.

=== Water supply ===
Water released from Oroville Dam travels down the Feather River before joining with the Sacramento River, eventually reaching the Sacramento-San Joaquin Delta, where the SWP's California Aqueduct diverts the fresh water for transport to the arid San Joaquin Valley and Southern California. Oroville–Thermalito hydroelectric facilities furnish about one-third of the power necessary to drive the pumps that lift the water in the aqueduct from the delta into the valley, and then from the valley over the Tehachapi Mountains into coastal Southern California. Water and power from the dam contribute to the irrigation of 755,000 acres (306,000 ha) in the arid San Joaquin Valley Westside and municipal supplies to some 25 million people. At least 2.8 million acre⋅ft (910 billion US gal; 3.5 trillion L) of water is released.

=== Flood control ===
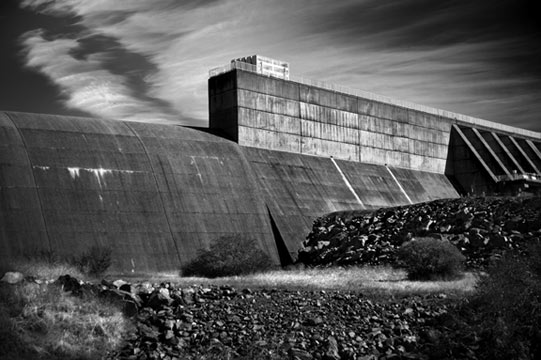
Partial view of the dam's emergency spillway (left) next to its main service spillway (far right) (2008)

During the winter and early spring, Lake Oroville is required to have at least 750,000 acre⋅ft (240 billion US gal; 930 billion L), or a fifth of the reservoir's storage capacity, available for flood control. The dam is operated to maintain an objective flood-control release of 150,000 cubic feet per second (4,200 m^{3}/s), which may be further reduced during large storms when flows below the Feather's confluence with the Yuba River exceed 300,000 cubic feet per second (8,500 m^{3}/s). In the particularly devastating flood of 1997, inflows to the reservoir hit more than 331,000 cubic feet per second (9,400 m^{3}/s), but dam operators managed to limit the outflow to 160,000 cubic feet per second (4,500 m^{3}/s), sparing large regions of the Sacramento Valley from flooding.

=== Feather River Fish Hatchery ===
Oroville Dam completely blocks the anadromous migrations of Chinook salmon and steelhead trout in the Feather River. In 1967, in an effort to compensate for lost habitat, the DWR and the California Department of Fish and Game completed the Feather River Fish Hatchery. The Fish Barrier Dam, built in 1962, intercepts salmon and trout before they reach the base of the impassable Thermalito Diversion Dam and forces them to swim up a fish ladder to the hatchery, which is located on the north bank of the Feather River. The hatchery produces 10 million salmon smolt, along with 450,000 trout smolt, to stock in the river each year. The salmon smolt are released in two runs, with 20% for the spring run and 80% for the fall run. This facility has been successful enough that concern exists that salmon of hatchery stock are outcompeting remaining wild salmon in the Feather River system.

== See also ==
- New Bullards Bar Dam
- List of hydroelectric power station failures
- List of dams and reservoirs in California
- List of lakes in California
- List of largest reservoirs of California
- List of power stations in California
- List of tallest dams in the United States
- New Bidwell Bar Bridge
