= Lake Oroville =

Reservoir in Butte County, California, U.S.

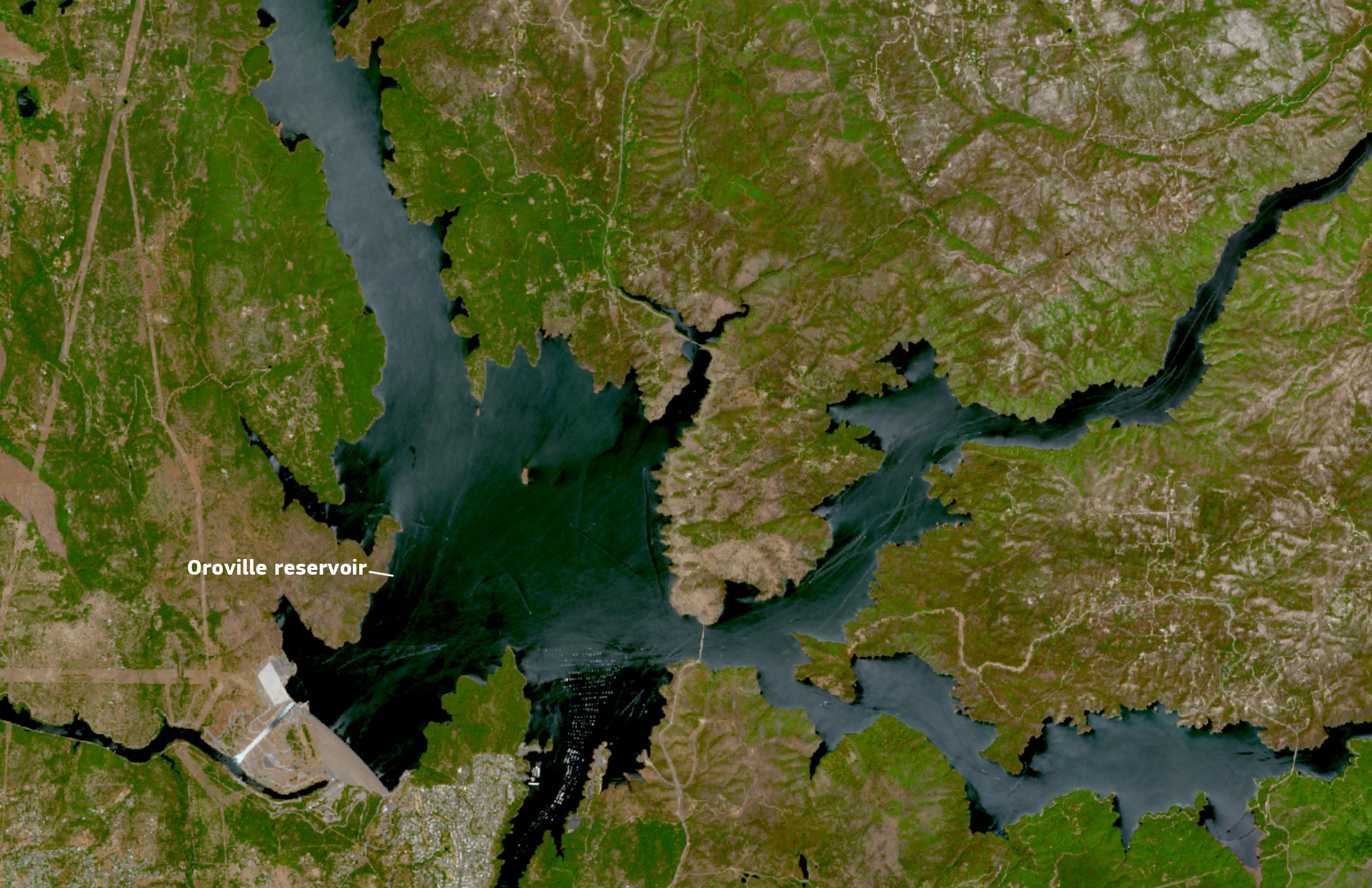
- Satellite image of the lake by Sentinel-2

- Location within California Location within the United States
- Location: Oroville East, Butte County, California
- Coordinates: 39°32′14″N 121°29′00″W at Oroville Dam
- Lake type: Reservoir
- Primary inflows: North Fork Feather River, Middle Fork Feather River, West Branch Feather River, South Fork Feather River, various other smaller streams
- Primary outflows: Feather River
- Catchment area: 3,950 square miles (10,200 km^{2})
- Basin countries: United States
- Managing agency: California Department of Water Resources
- Built: 1961 (Construction started on Oroville Dam) 2017-2019 (Spillway Rebuilt)
- First flooded: 1969
- Water volume: 3,537,577 acre-feet (4.363537×10^{9} m^{3})
- Shore length^{1}: 167 miles (269 km)
- Surface elevation: 901 feet (275 m)
- Frozen: Never
- Islands: Bloomer Island, Foreman Island, others unnamed
- Settlements: Oroville
- Website: water.ca.gov/programs/state-water-project/swp-facilities/oroville
- ^{1} Shore length is not a well-defined measure.

Lake Oroville is a reservoir formed by the Oroville Dam impounding the Feather River, located in Butte County, northern California. The lake is situated 5 miles (8 km) northeast of the city of Oroville, within the Lake Oroville State Recreation Area, in the western foothills of the Sierra Nevada. Known as the second-largest reservoir in California, Lake Oroville is treated as a keystone facility within the California State Water Project by storing water, providing flood control, recreation, freshwater releases to assist in controlling the salinity intrusion into the Sacramento-San Joaquin Delta and protecting fish and wildlife.

The lake is a popular nationally renowned bass fishing location, while coho salmon are stocked from the Feather River Fish Hatchery. This hatchery is a main component of Lake Oroville.

== History ==
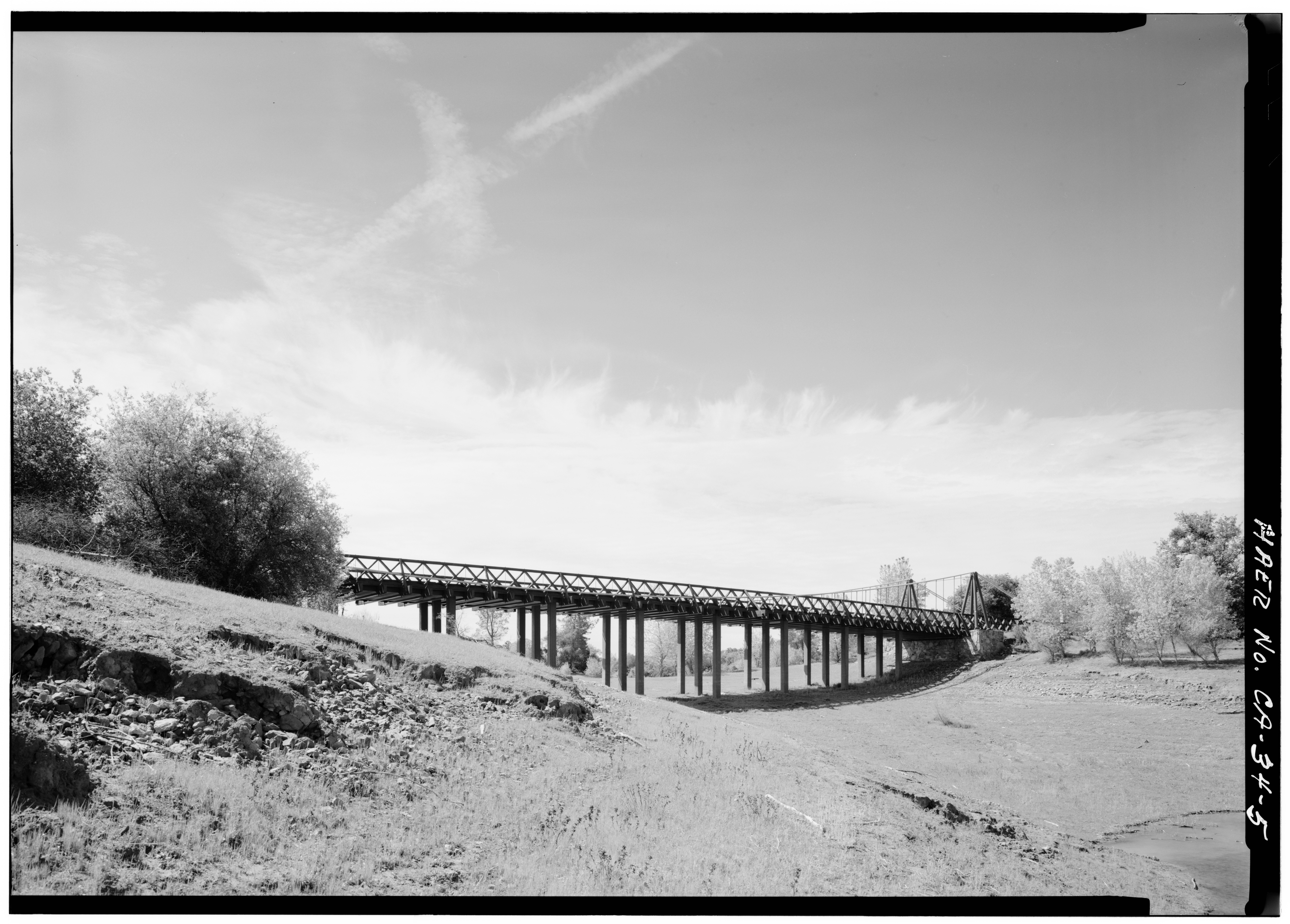
Bidwell Bar Suspension Bridge

The local indigenous tribe were the Konkow Maidu (translation is 'man') who originally settled the lake region and Feather River for many years. Today many of the small towns including Oroville were originally occupied by the Maidu people. In 2002, a Sonoma State study took archaeological inventory of the 15,476 acres (6,263 ha) of Lake Oroville to learn 250 sites are from the prehistoric era relating to the Native American life along the Feather River and an additional 478 sites dating to the Gold Rush. These sites included open-air residential sites, caves and rockshelters, limited lithic scatters, rock art, quarries and workshops, bedrock milling sites and cemetery areas. Natives' lives were disrupted by gold discovery in 1848 and the miners infiltrated their lands. In April 1848, only three months after gold was discovered at Sutter's Mill, John Bidwell found gold on the Feather River at a spot known today as the town of Bidwell Bar. Bidwell began to work the claim using local Konkow Maidu workers. Due to the rapidly spreading news of the California strikes, in under a year California's non-native population climbed from 20,000 to 100,000. By 1850, Butte County alone supported 3,052 miners.

Construction on the dam began in 1957 to relocate what is now Highway 70 and the then Western Pacific (now Union Pacific) Railroad. A few years later the partially completed dam checked flooding on the Feather River in December 1964. This saved the Sacramento Valley from flooding.

Prior to impoundment by the Oroville Dam, the current main basin of Lake Oroville was the location of the confluence of the North Fork Feather River with the Feather River (39°33′20″N 121°28′0″W) and the now-inundated towns of Bidwell (39°33′25″N 121°27′56″W) and Land (39°33′13″N 121°28′04″W). Completed in 1968, Oroville Dam is an earthen dam and is the tallest dam located in the United States, measuring over 770 ft (230 m) high and 6,920 ft (2,110 m) across. The dam was the largest earth-fill dam in the world until succeeded by Aswan High Dam in Egypt. It was built by the California Department of Water Resources as part of the California State Water Project. The dam houses the Edward Hyatt Powerplant, an underground hydro-electric plant that was completed in 1967. Six generators are used to provide a maximum generating capacity of 819 MW.

== Hydrology ==
Lake Oroville and Oroville Dam are part of the Oroville–Thermalito Complex, a water infrastructure complex including the Hyatt Powerplant, Thermalito Diversion Dam and Powerplant, the Feather River Fish Hatchery, Thermalito Power Canal, Thermalito Forebay, Thermalito Pumping-Generating Plant, Thermalito Afterbay, and the Lake Oroville Visitors Center.

The lake is fed by the North Fork, Middle Fork, West Branch and South Fork of the Feather River watershed. This watershed drains an area of 3,611 square miles (9,350 km^{2}). The North Fork and Middle Fork Feather Rivers comprise 3,222 square miles (8,340 km^{2}) of this area which includes portions of the foothill and mountain regions of the northern Sierra Nevada and southern Cascade Range. Storing over 3,500,000 acre-feet (4.3×10^{9} m^{3}), it is the second-largest reservoir in California, after Shasta Lake. About one-third of the water released from the reservoir goes to uses between the Oroville and Sacramento–San Joaquin Delta.

Lake Oroville plays an important role in flood management, water quality, and the health of fisheries affecting areas downstream like the Sacramento-San Joaquin River Delta. During the warm season, the primary source of streamflow is melting snow, occurring April 1 – July 31, and Lake Oroville receives about 40 percent of the annual total inflow. The lake's storage and releases are a key part of the hydropower and water-supply facilities of the Oroville Complex, the reason it's a pillar and major source of flexibility of the SWP. The downstream flow limits set by the USACE for Lake Oroville are 150,000 cu ft/s (4,200 m^{3}/s) north of Honcut Creek, 180,000 cu ft/s (5,100 m^{3}/s) above the mouth of the Yuba River, and 320,000 cu ft/s (9,100 m^{3}/s) south of the Bear River.

The Federal Energy Regulatory Commission (FERC) licenses hydroelectric facilities such as the Edward Hyatt Power Plant at Oroville Dam. California's Department of Water Resources and stakeholders recently participated in a six-year renewal process for a 50-year hydroelectric license for the Oroville Facilities. This agreement commits the state to: restore salmon and steelhead habitat, improved river recreation and community benefits, and a fish passage study to determine and launch a project to enhance passage in the Feather and surrounding river basins.

Due to federal flood control requirements, by mid-October each year, the lake's storage must be reduced to a specified level within the range of a maximum flood control pool of 750,000 acre-feet (0.93 km^{3}) and a minimum of 375,000 acre-feet (463,000,000 m^{3}). Each day the allowable level within the range is recalculated using an index reflecting the watershed wetness and the anticipation of heavy runoff from incoming storms. As a wet season like 1997–98 progresses, the allowable storage tends to coincide with the maximum flood control pool. The reservoir operators must balance the conflicting objectives of controlling the current flood event and preparing for a possible future one.

=== Spillway emergency ===
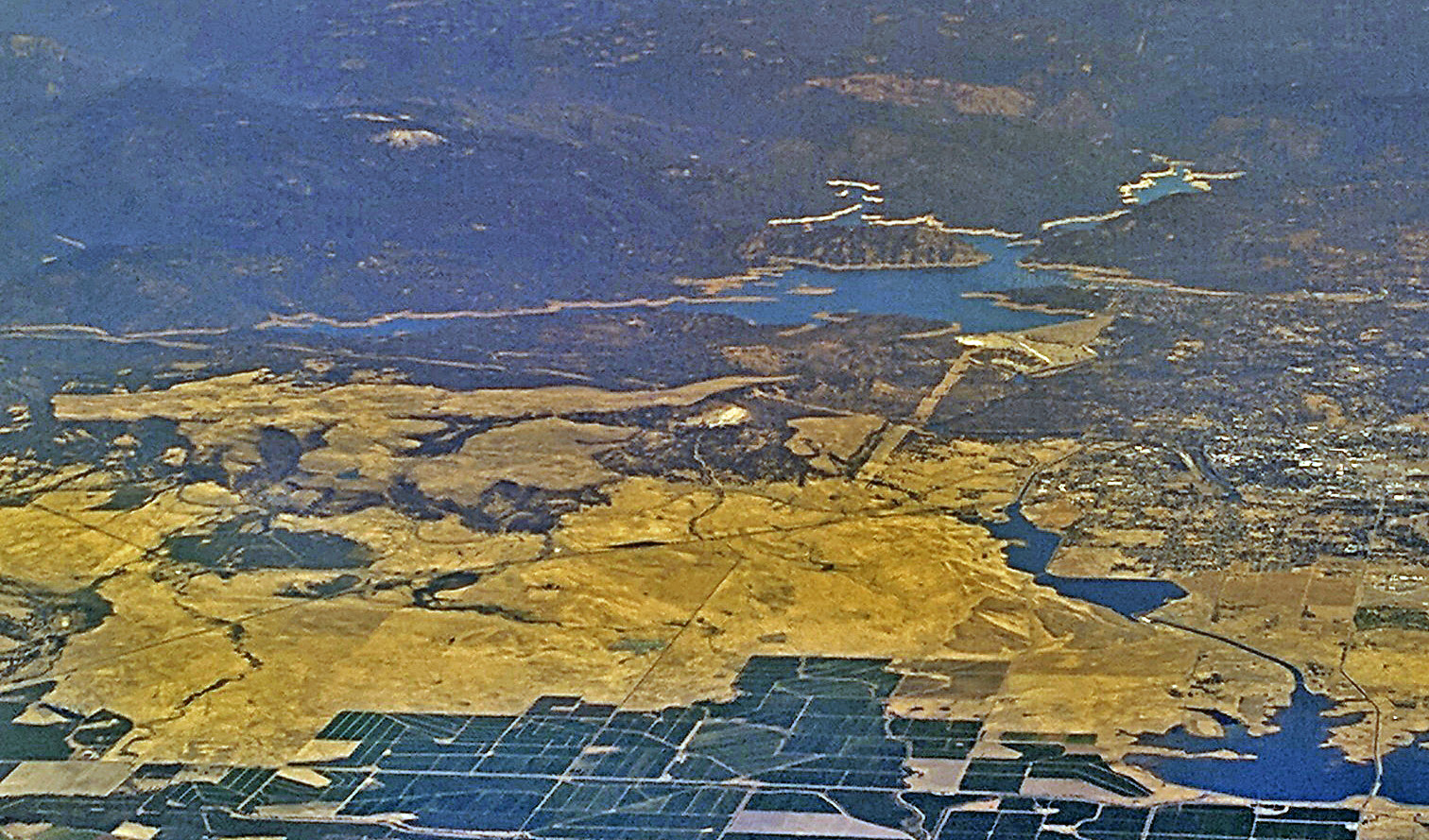
Aerial view from the west of Lake Oroville, the Oroville Dam, Thermalito Forebay and Thermalito Afterbay, and vicinity

In February 2017, extreme precipitation and high spillway releases caused significant damage to the main concrete spillway. Due to this damage, releases were cut back and lake level increased to 101% of capacity, causing the emergency spillway to overflow for the first time in the Lake's history. Below the emergency spillway, severe erosion occurred, and fear of a failure of the emergency spillway prompted an evacuation of downstream residents.

Phase 1 of emergency spillway repairs was completed in 2017. The main spillway was successfully reconstructed by November 1, 2018.

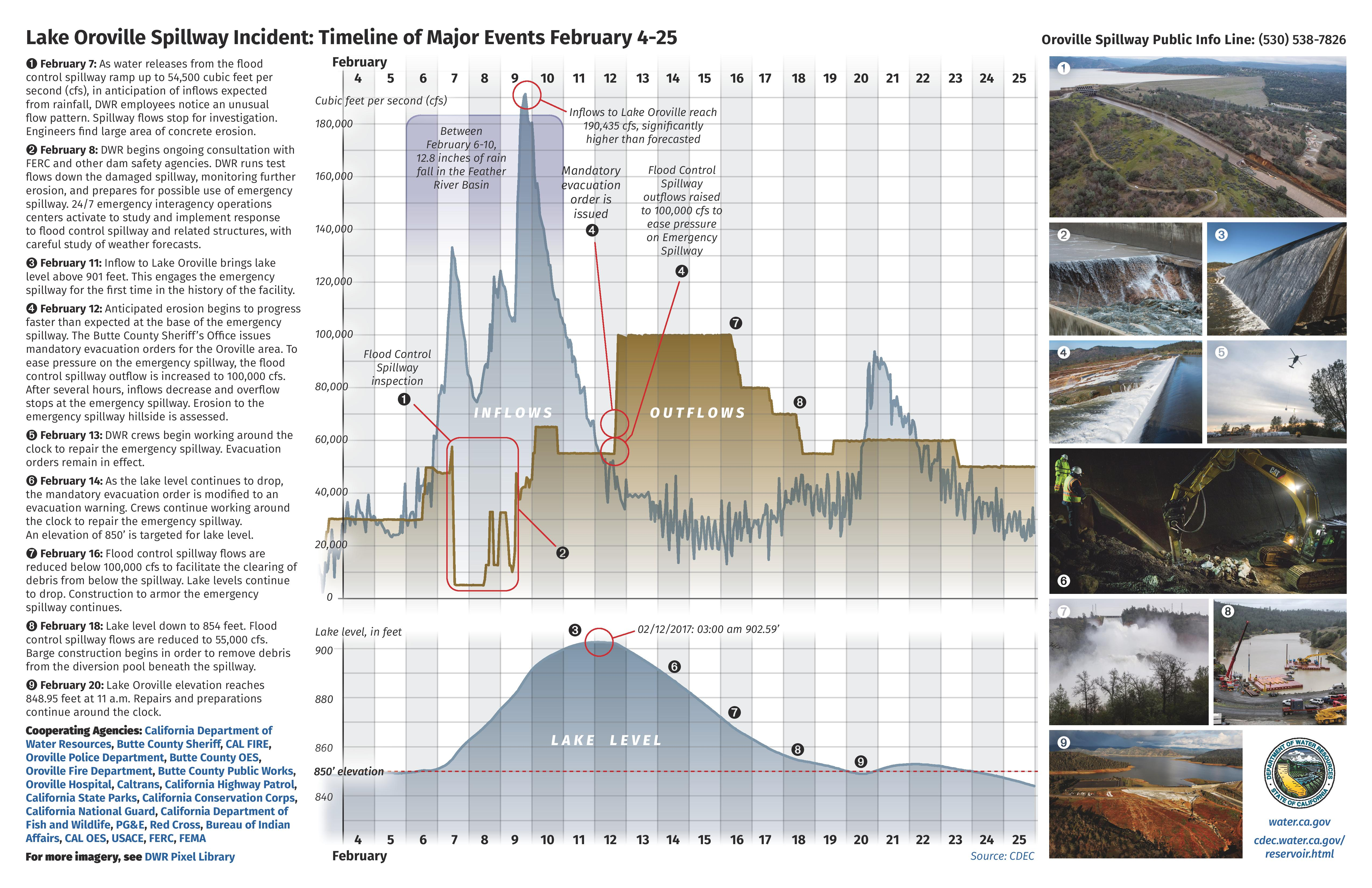

== Recreation ==
The lake offers multiple recreational activities for the public to participate in. The Lake Oroville Visitor Center has a museum, exhibits, videos and a store. People like to look through the two high-powered telescopes on the 47-foot tall tower to see the lake, Sierra Nevada, valley, foothills, and the Sutter Buttes mountain range.

=== Fishing ===
Fishing is described as outstanding at Lake Oroville State Recreation Area. People can fish for largemouth, smallmouth, and spotted bass, Chinook, catfish, mackinaw, sturgeon, white crappie and brown trout. The largest mackinaw caught was 19 pounds (8.6 kg) and a 3 pounds (1.4 kg) white crappie. It is permitted all year long but a California sport fishing license is required.

The California Office of Environmental Health Hazard Assessment (OEHHA) has developed a safe eating advisory for Lake Oroville based on levels of mercury or PCBs found in fish caught from this water body.

=== Boating ===
Boating occurs year-round, including waterskiing, wakeboarding, houseboats, PWC, and trolling. There are five multi-lane boat launch ramps. These are located at Bidwell Canyon, Loafer Creek, Spillway, Lime Saddle, Enterprise, Nelson Bar, Vinton Gulch, Foreman Creek, and Dark Canyon. Boat supplies and rentals are available on the south end of the Lake at Bidwell Marina or the north end at Lake Oroville Marina.

Visitors can rent kayaks, canoes, sailboats, paddleboats and more at the Forebay Aquatic Center located at the North Forebay.

=== Camping ===
Another major activity is camping by using the campground, floating campsites, boat-in camps, or equestrian campsites.

== Feather River fish hatchery ==
A key component of Lake Oroville is the hatchery that manages thriving populations of Chinook salmon and steelhead trout for the Feather River ecosystem. Before the Oroville Dam was constructed, a majority of the fish hatcheries were located on the eastern side of the mountain range (about 100 miles northeast of the hatchery's current location). The first hatchery was constructed in 1916, the Yuba River Shad Hatchery was built on the Feather River to stop the over fishing of shad in the lower Sacramento River. This effort failed, leading to the hatchery closure, because the Shad's first run did not produce enough eggs and the river had a light run. The main goal of Domingo Springs, built in 1916, was to supply fish to the lakes and streams in Lassen National Park and the surrounding area. In 1937, floods damaged the hatchery and it was eventually abandoned. The next phase, built near Clio in Plumas County, was a trout hatchery building and employee cabins that operated for 30 years. By 1953, the work was outdated, so the operation was abandoned, creating a 14-year gap in hatchery work. The Department of Water Resources built the Oroville Dam in 1961, which altered the river flow, so DWR built the present hatchery with the Department of Fish and Wildlife. The dam blocked salmon and steelhead access to upstream spawning areas, so to further mitigate impacts, a barrier and ladder system was built that allows adult salmon and steelhead to be captured at the Feather River Fish Hatchery.

Today the hatchery is managed by the California Department of Fish and Wildlife, raising spring- and fall-run Chinook salmon and steelhead along the Feather River, directly below Lake Oroville. The hatchery is divided into two sections. The first section located on the east side of Table Mountain Boulevard includes a fish barrier dam, an observation platform, and underwater viewing. The second section, located on the west side of Table Mountain Boulevard, includes a spawning room, a hatchery, and rearing ponds. Salmon-spawning operations can be observed mid-September until mid-November, but fish are present in the rearing ponds all year.

Annually on the fourth Saturday of September, the Oroville Salmon Festival occurs at the hatchery and downtown Oroville. It is known as the only California salmon festival where personnel work Chinook salmon to harvest and fertilize eggs.

== Climate ==
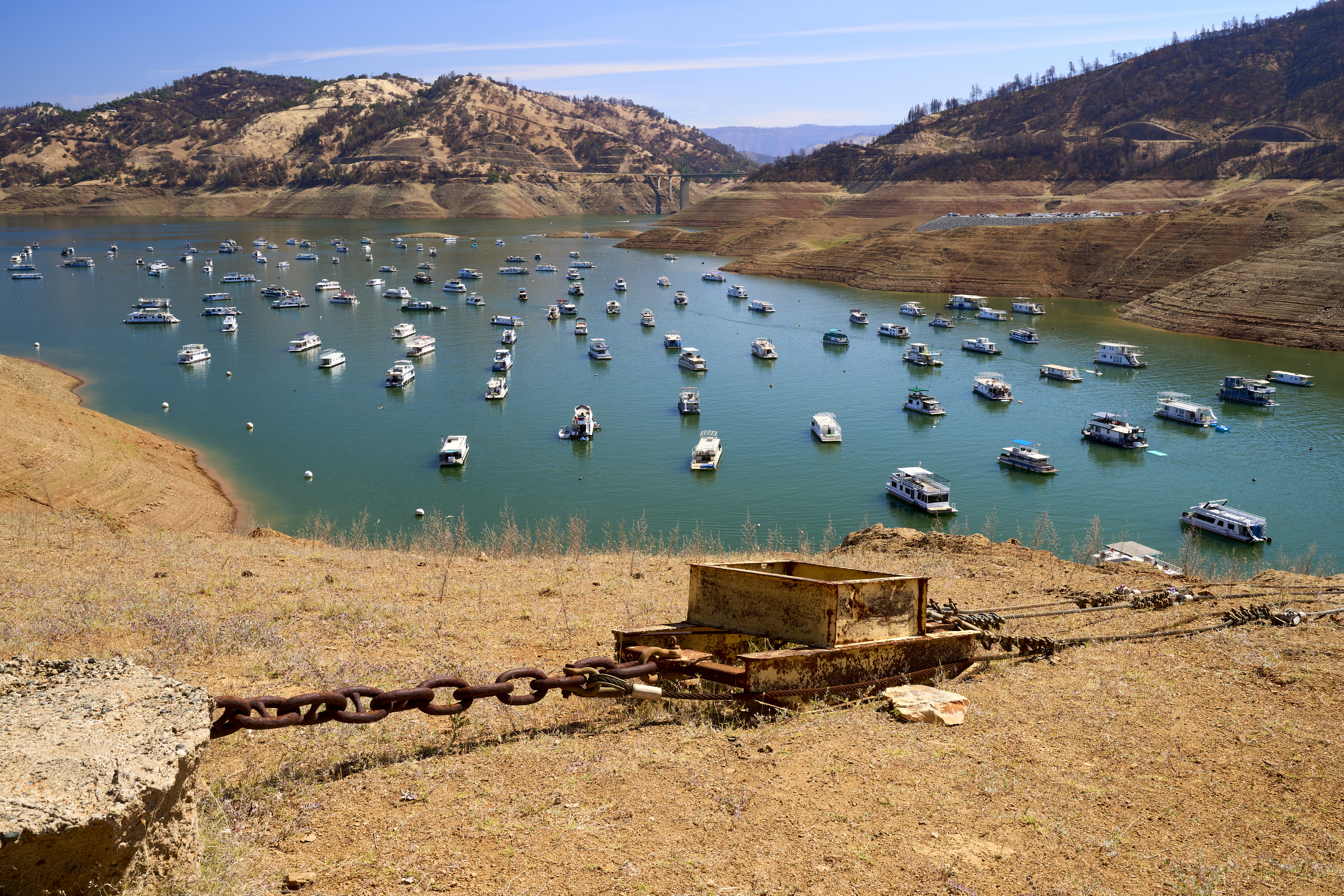
In May 2021, water levels of Lake Oroville dropped significantly, exposing much of the lake's banks as shown in this photograph, as California headed into another drought year. The Edward Hyatt hydroelectric power plant at Oroville Dam was forced to shut down due to low water levels later in the summer.

Lake Oroville has a Mediterranean type climate with hot, dry summers and cool wet winters. A semi-permanent, high pressure area of the mid-Pacific Ocean dominates and controls the weather in northern California. During the summer this high-pressure cell pushes storm tracks into the north causing this hot dry summer. In winter, it moves south allowing storms to cross northern California bringing wetter and cooler winters.

The annual average high temperature is 75.2 °F (24.0 °C) and annual average low is 49 °F (9 °C) with average temperature of 62.1 °F (16.7 °C). The coldest months are winter – December to January with average high 56 °F (13 °C) and low 38 °F (3 °C). The warmest months are in the summer – June, July, and August with average high 93 °F (34 °C). The average annual rainfall precipitation is 30.66 inches (779 mm); January is the wettest month at 5.71 inches (145 mm) and July the driest at 0.08 inches (2 mm).

In 2015, Northern California experienced a drastic drought reducing the lake level to 39% capacity in January 2016.

The year 2017 has made up for the five-year drought by having above-average precipitation. The excess of water created a new danger – see 2017 Oroville Dam crisis.

In 2021, another drought affected California which resulted in the lake level falling to 35% of its capacity in July. In August, the Hyatt hydroelectric plant was turned off for the first time when levels fell near the minimum necessary to generate power (640 feet (200 m) above sea level). The loss of power could cause an increased number of rolling blackouts during the summer heat wave. Operations resumed in January 2022 following significant rainfall in December.

== Wildlife ==
=== Species of fish ===
The species raised at the Feather River Fish Hatchery include Chinook salmon (Oncorhynchus tshawytscha) and steelhead trout (Oncorhynchus mykiss).

Chinook salmon are supported by California streams. They display a wide array of life history patterns allowing them to live in the diverse, variable riverine and ocean environments. As anadromous fish, they migrate upstream as adults to spawn in freshwater streams, and as juveniles migrate downstream to the ocean, where they grow into mature adults. There are seventeen distinct runs of Chinook salmon recognized in California, classified into six major groups or evolutionarily significant units. Currently, these are a Species of Concern under the Federal Endangered Species Act.

The hatchery spawn, rear and release the Fall and Spring Run Chinook salmon of local origin. The trout, being an anadromous form of rainbow trout, spawn for multiple years in rivers and creeks, transition into the ocean but return to the rivers to start the lifecycle again.

== Downriver facilities ==
The Hyatt Generating–Pumping Plant source water for the Feather River is released from two discharge tunnels at up to 17,500 cu ft/s (500 m^{3}/s) during peak demand and "little or no release the remainder of the day". The power plant also routinely draws up to 5,610 cu ft/s (159 m^{3}/s) of Feather River water for "pumpback" into Lake Oroville. Hyatt releases are stored in the 4.40 mi (7.08 km) serpentine river channel (Thermalito Diversion Pool) which extends from the river's source to the Thermalito Diversion Dam.

== See also ==
- California State Water Project
- Feather Headwaters
- Feather River
- Lake Oroville State Recreation Area
- List of dams and reservoirs in California
- List of lakes in California
- List of largest reservoirs in the United States
- List of largest reservoirs of California
