= Dixie Fire =

2021 wildfire in Northern California

- Part of the 2021 California wildfires
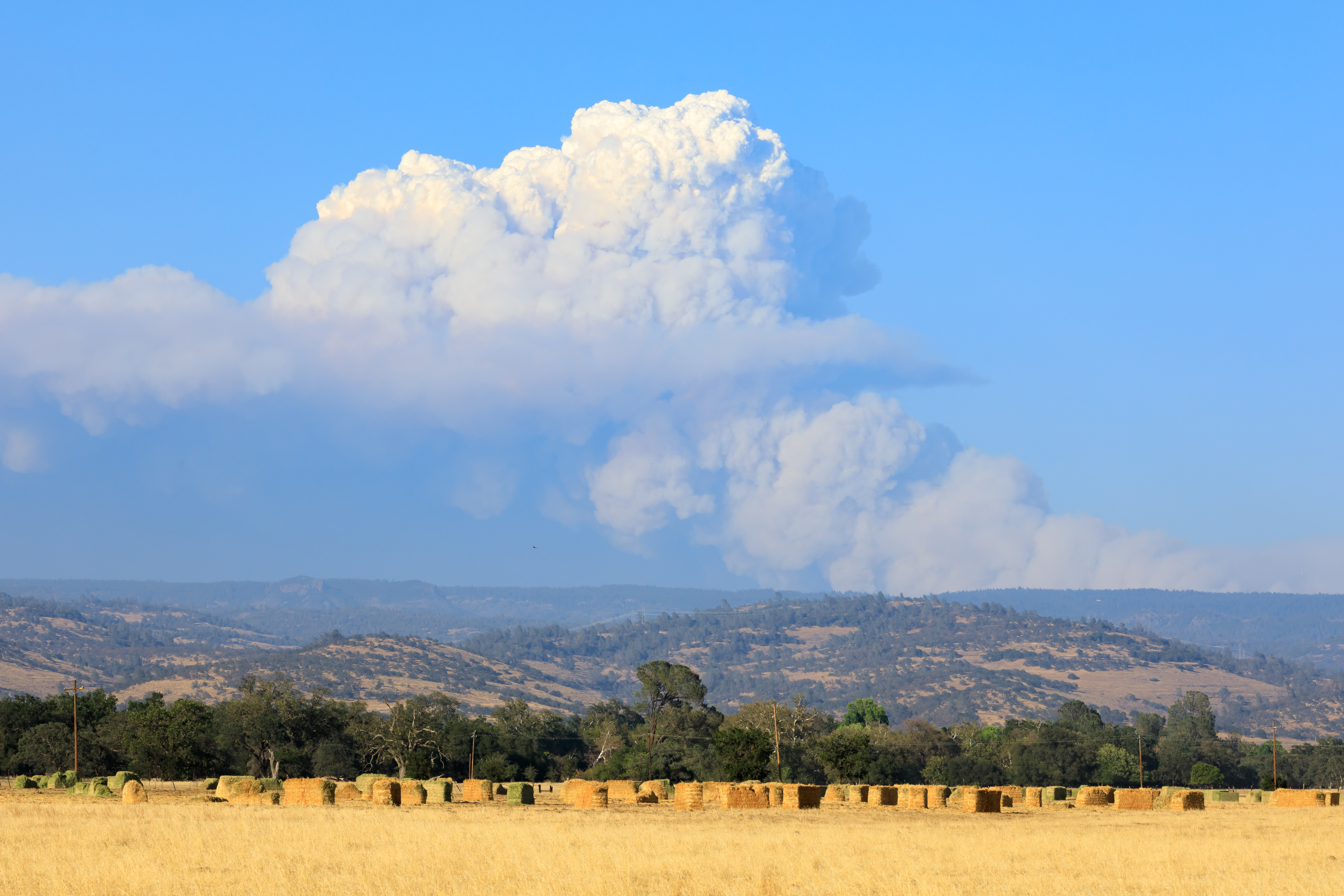
- A pyrocumulus cloud rising from the Dixie Fire, looking east from a country road north of Chico on the evening of July 22, 2021
- Date: July 13 –; October 25, 2021; (105 days)
- Location: Butte, Plumas, Shasta, Tehama, and Lassen counties, Northern California, United States
- Coordinates: 39.819°N 121.419°W

Statistics
- Burned area: 963,309 acres 1,505 square miles; 3,898 square kilometres; 389,837 hectares

Impacts
- Deaths: 1 firefighter; 0 civilians
- Injuries: 3 firefighters
- Evacuated: >9,500
- Structures destroyed: 1,329 destroyed; 95 damaged
- Cost: $1.15 billion USD (minimum estimate)

Ignition
- Cause: Tree falling on power distribution line
- Perpetrators: Pacific Gas and Electric Company (PG&E)

Map
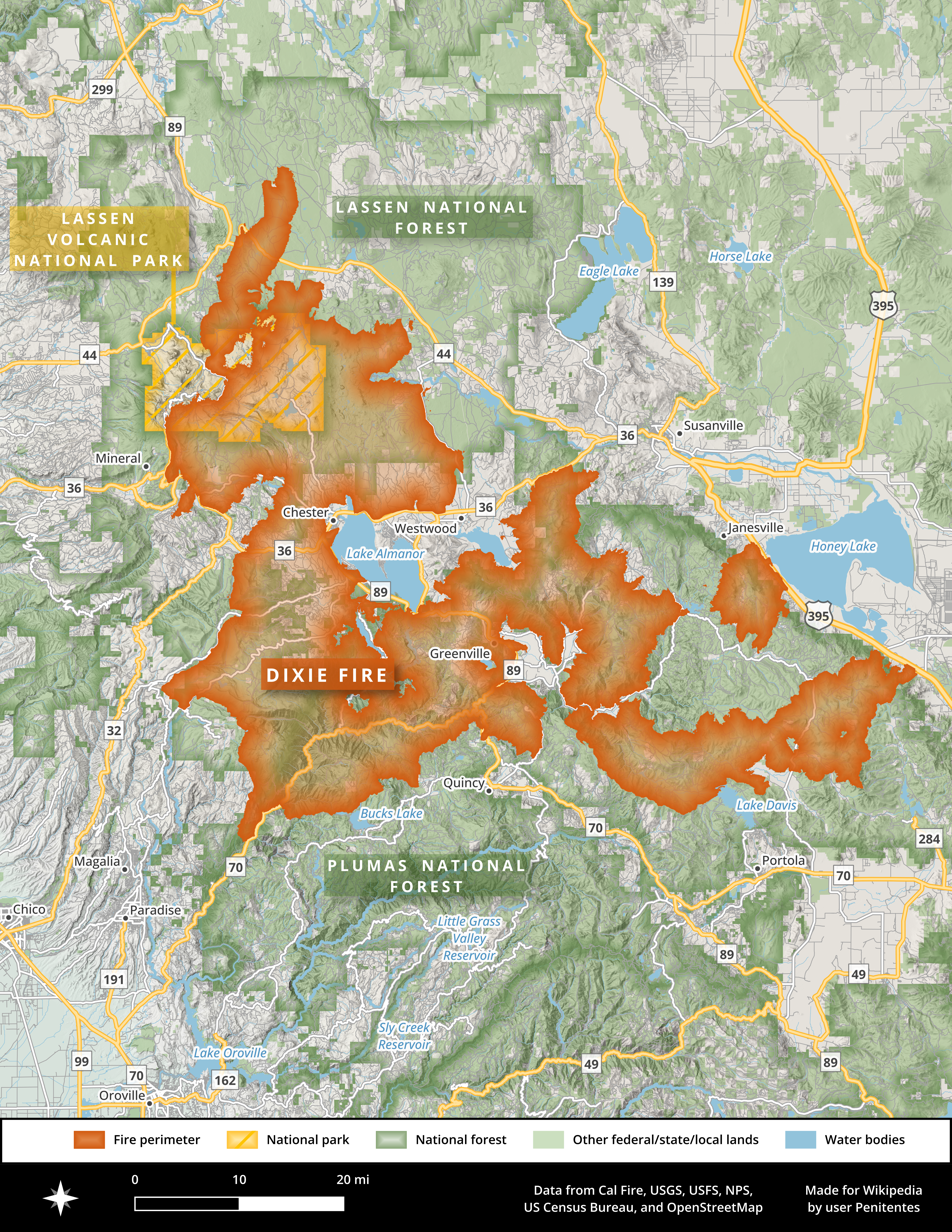
- The Dixie Fire burned through large parts of Plumas National Forest, Lassen National Forest, and Lassen Volcanic National Park.

- Location in Northern California

The 2021 Dixie Fire was an enormous wildfire in Butte, Plumas, Lassen, Shasta, and Tehama counties in Northern California. Named after a nearby Dixie Road, the fire began in the Feather River Canyon near Cresta Dam in Butte County on July 13, 2021, and burned 963,309 acres (389,837 ha) before it was declared 100 percent contained on October 25, 2021. It was the largest single source wildfire (as compared to a complex wildfire, with multiple ignition points) in recorded California history, and the second-largest wildfire overall (after the August Complex fire of 2020), The fire damaged or destroyed several communities, including Greenville on August 4, Canyondam on August 5, and Warner Valley on August 12.

The Dixie Fire was the largest and most destructive fire of the 2021 California wildfire season. It was the first fire known to have burned across the crest of the Sierra Nevada (followed by the Caldor Fire later in the season). Smoke from the Dixie Fire caused unhealthy air quality across the Western United States, including states as far east as Utah and Colorado. The Dixie Fire was the most expensive wildfire (measured by cost of the firefighting effort) in United States history, costing $637.4 million to suppress.

== Background ==
A number of factors contributed to the size and intensity of the Dixie Fire. 2021 was the hottest summer ever recorded in California. That year also saw further intensification of what scientists have found to be the most extreme megadrought in at least 1,200 years in the Western/Southwestern United States, amplified by high temperatures, low precipitation, and anthropogenic climate change: during the 2021 water year (the period between October 1, 2020, and September 30, 2021), Northern California received less than half of its usual precipitation. The Sierra snowpack, measured during its typical peak on April 1, was just 59 percent of the historical average, and runoff just 20 percent of the amount forecast. Reservoirs in the state shrunk, and vegetation dried out to the point where both living and dead conifers were drier than kiln-dried lumber.

Rigorous fire suppression policies in the United States also meant that much of the area burned by the Dixie Fire had little fire history, going back more than 40 years. The resulting overcrowded forests became more vulnerable to drought, as well as bark beetle infestations that were the primary cause of death for more than 163 million trees in California between 2010 and 2019. Bark beetle-affected forests (especially species common in the Sierra Nevada such as the lodgepole pine) are chemically altered, and the dead and dying trees are more flammable and more susceptible to intense crown fires.

== Progression ==
=== Ignition ===
The Dixie Fire began on July 13, 2021, beneath a Pacific Gas and Electric (PG&E) 12-kilovolt power distribution line located on the northern side of the Feather River Canyon in a remote area above Highway 70 and Cresta Dam, midway between Paradise and Belden. Transmission lines (also operated by PG&E) further down the canyon were the cause of the devastating and fatal Camp Fire in 2018. At approximately 6:48 a.m. PDT a large Douglas fir, 65 feet (20 m) tall and 16 inches (41 cm) in diameter, fell onto the power line. Why the tree fell is unknown—an arborist with Cal Fire said the tree was weakened after burning in the 2008 Butte Lightning Complex, while another arborist hired by PG&E noted possible root rot. When the tree fell onto the line, two fuses blew but one remained active, keeping the power line energized. The tree, in contact with both the line and the ground, created an electrical fault. Electric arcing slowly ignited fuels on the ground over the following hours.

At 1:30 p.m., a PG&E troubleman (a type of lineworker) came to address the resulting power outage. Access roads were in poor condition, and the troubleman was forced to stop at a bridge undergoing repairs. The troubleman left and returned at approximately 4:30 p.m., arriving at the power lines 10 minutes later. Noticing the two blown fuses, the troubleman was in the process of shutting off the third when he smelled smoke—looking down, he observed a fire approximately 600–800 square feet (56–74 m^{2}) in size, burning among pine needles beneath the powerlines. The troubleman shut off the third fuse, then took a fire extinguisher from his truck and unsuccessfully attempted to put the fire out. He was able to raise his supervisor by radio, who called 911. In the meantime, the troubleman returned to the fire with another fire extinguisher and a McLeod tool, attempting to rake and dig a firebreak.

As the fire became visible from Highway 70 on the opposite side of the Feather River Canyon, it prompted multiple reports to 911. A fire engine strike team leader returning home from the Beckwourth Complex called 911 at roughly 5:12 p.m., reporting a well-established fire about 40 by 40 feet (12 m × 12 m). By 5:15 p.m., the Oroville emergency command center had dispatched a full wildland response, including six fire engines, two bulldozers, two handcrews, two water tenders, two airtankers, and a helicopter. Aircraft were overhead by 5:42 p.m., reporting that the now-named Dixie Fire was two acres (0.81 ha) with a slow rate of spread. Air tankers promptly began to drop fire retardant—more than 7,000 gallons over the course of the evening—and helicopters scooped water from the Feather River below.

By 6:31 p.m., aircraft had completed a line of retardant around the entire perimeter and the fire remained two acres (0.81 ha). Ground personnel, however, faced the same access issues that had plagued the PG&E troubleman, including the damaged bridge and rough dirt roads. At 7:49 p.m. a drone was reported in the vicinity of the fire, and all aircraft were ordered to leave the area. Because it was so late and regulations generally do not permit firefighting aircraft to fly in the dark, air operations were not able to resume that night. The drone's appearance meant about 45 minutes of flying time was lost, which Butte County district attorney Mike Ramsey said played a large role in the fire escaping control. The drone's operator was never identified, despite a multi-agency investigation that involved state and local agencies, the FAA and the FBI. With aircraft no longer able to help, limited ground access, and the fire exposed to nightly up-canyon winds, the Dixie Fire began to grow considerably.

=== July ===
By 8:00 a.m. the following morning, July 14, the fire had burned 500 acres (200 ha), and by the end of the day it had grown still further to 2,200 acres (890 ha) with no containment despite the efforts of more than 150 firefighting personnel.

Over the next few days, the fire progressed rapidly northeast along the Feather River canyon, forcing the closure of Highway 70, the Union Pacific Railroad's Feather River Route, and nearby areas of the Plumas National Forest and Lassen National Forest. By July 19 it had burned 40,500 acres (16,400 ha); over the next two days, the fire more than doubled in size to 85,000 acres (34,000 ha), driven by high winds. As of July 21, the fire was 15 percent contained, with nearly 4,000 firefighters and numerous aircraft assigned to the incident.

By July 23, flames had traveled north almost to Highway 89 and Lake Almanor, after jumping over Butte Valley Reservoir. On the east flank, the fire was advancing toward Bucks Lake and Indian Valley, and on the west, it was burning toward Butte Meadows. It had grown to 167,430 acres (67,760 ha) with 18 percent containment. Governor Gavin Newsom declared a state of emergency for Plumas, Butte, Lassen and Alpine counties due to the Dixie, Fly and Tamarack Fires. By then, the Dixie Fire had become the largest wildfire of the year in California.

On July 24 the fire expanded rapidly east, burning through Paxton and then Indian Falls, destroying around a dozen structures. Firefighters successfully kept the fire north of Bucks Lake, while flames approached the Indian Valley communities of Crescent Mills, Greenville and Taylorsville on the east. Later that night it merged with the smaller Fly Fire, which had started the previous day north of Quincy and burned over 4,300 acres (1,700 ha). The Dixie Fire grew to 181,289 acres (73,365 ha) with 19 percent containment.

On July 30 the fire was at 240,595 acres (97,365 ha), becoming the 11th largest wildfire in California history, having grown 20,000 acres (8,100 ha) in a single day. However, much of the growth was due to islands of unburned vegetation within the fire perimeter, as well as back burning operations to protect homes in Butte Meadows and Jonesville. Firefighters also contained the eastward spread of the fire with back burning from Mount Hough down to Quincy.

=== August ===
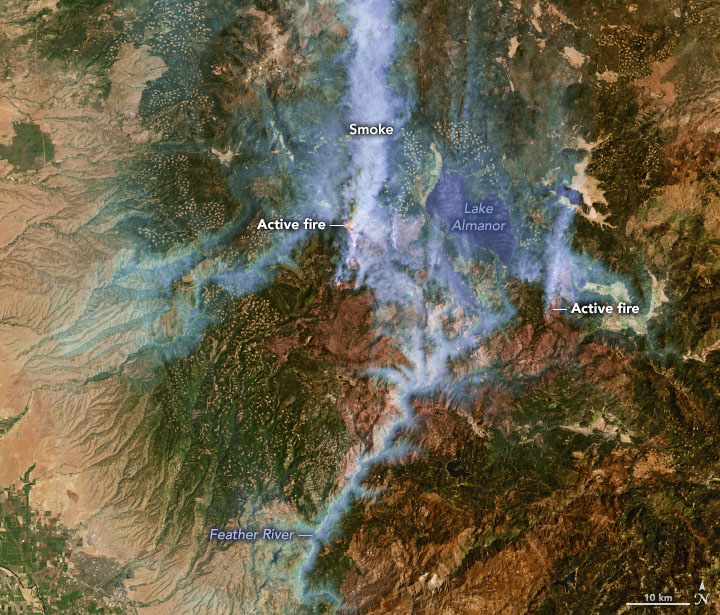
Dixie Fire on August 4, 2021, as seen by Landsat 7

At the start of August, the fire was most active on the north flank, having split into two main branches, with one burning up the western shore of Lake Almanor, and the other burning northeast toward Indian Valley. Fire activity was greatly decreased along the south side from Bucks Lake to Quincy, as well as the west side around Butte Meadows. Beginning on August 3, after several days of calmer weather, a major wind event drove the fire up the west shore of Lake Almanor, threatening Chester and other nearby communities. Firefighting efforts were concentrated on protecting the town, while the fire front continued sweeping north into Lassen County, the Lassen National Forest and the eastern side of Lassen Volcanic National Park.

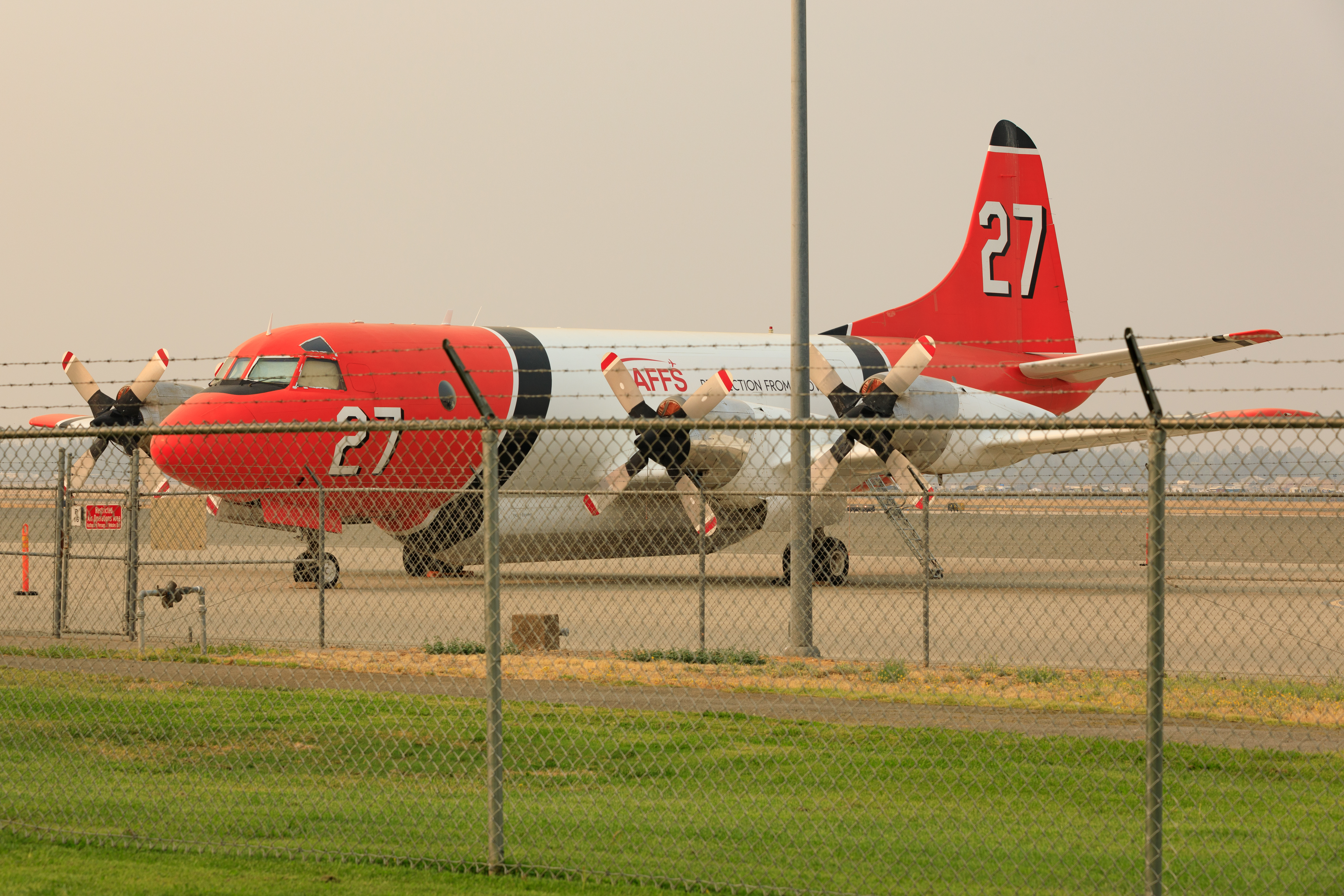
Airtanker at Chico Municipal Airport on August 8, 2021

On the evening of August 4, the northeast flank of the fire jumped containment lines at Indian Valley and burned through the town of Greenville. An estimated 75 percent of structures in Greenville were destroyed, including much of the downtown and numerous nearby homes. The firestorm was compared to "a huge tornado" and took less than half an hour to destroy the town before leaping to the other side of Indian Valley and continuing northeast towards Mountain Meadows Reservoir. The whole Dixie Fire grew to over 320,000 acres (130,000 ha), an increase of 50,000 acres (20,000 ha) in two days, and was 35 percent contained. It became the sixth-largest wildfire in California history, surpassing the North Complex Fire that had burned nearby in 2020.

On August 5, the fire burned much of Canyondam as it approached the eastern shore of Lake Almanor. By the morning of August 8, the fire had grown to 463,477 acres (187,562 ha), surpassing the 2018 Mendocino Complex Fire to become the second largest fire in the state's history, with containment falling to 21 percent. Starting on August 13 increased winds pushed flames primarily to the east. The northern section of the fire expanded around the north side of Lake Almanor, heading east and south and threatening Westwood. The fire's eastern section, having burned past Indian Valley, continued to race east towards Antelope Lake. It became the first fire to ever cross from the west side of the Sierra Nevada to the valley floor on the east side.

In the evening of August 16, winds of up to 30 mph (48 kmh) drove embers from the Dixie Fire over the Diamond Mountains and into the Honey Lake Valley. A number of spot fires ignited south of Janesville and crossed Highway 395, destroying several homes. This put areas south of Johnstonville under mandatory evacuation warning, including the town of Janesville. Continued southwest winds threatened to push the fire towards Susanville. In Lassen National Park, the area burned within the park had doubled to 22,000 acres (8,900 ha), and firefighters were building line to protect Manzanita Lake and Old Station areas.

On August 18, the Dixie Fire merged with the Morgan Fire, which had been started by lightning August 12, near the south entrance of Lassen National Park. In addition to burning north into the park, the Morgan Fire had threatened the communities of Mineral and Mill Creek just to the south. The Morgan and Dixie fires were joined by a backfire set in order to reduce fuels adjacent to the two towns. By the end of the day, the Dixie Fire had grown to over 635,000 acres (257,000 ha), an increase of more than 80,000 acres (32,000 ha) since August 15, with containment at 33 percent.

By August 22, the Dixie Fire approached Milford but crews were able to protect the structures and containment rose to 37 percent, the highest since the fire began. Growth of the fire slowed overnight due to increased humidity but overall weather conditions remained challenging.

==== Associated arson ====
In late July and early August 2021, U.S. Forest Service investigators investigated a spree of wildland arson set by former university professor Gary Stephen Maynard in the vicinity of the Dixie Fire. Investigators connected Maynard to at least five fires, all of which were stopped at one acre (0.40 ha) or less and which did no serious damage. The Moon, Ranch, and Conard fires were set behind crews battling the Dixie Fire. Prosecutors seeking to prevent Maynard's release while awaiting trial argued that the fires might have endangered those personnel, leaving them trapped between the Dixie Fire and Maynard's fires, had investigators not been tracking him.

On July 20, 2021, mountain bikers reported the Cascade Fire on the slopes of Mount Shasta. A responding Forest Service investigator encountered Maynard attempting to free his car from a rut on a dirt road nearby, and took a photo of the car and its tire tracks. The next day, investigators responding to the Everitt Fire in a nearby part of the Shasta-Trinity National Forest noted identical tire tracks. Both fires were determined to have been caused by arson; additionally, burnt newspaper and a match were found where Maynard's car had been stuck. After linking Maynard to the two fires via several other methods, including surveillance footage and his use of an EBT card, investigators received a warrant to track Maynard's phone and vehicle. On August 3, 2021, during a traffic stop in Susanville, a Forest Service agent placed a tracking device on Maynard's car. On August 5, the agents tailing Maynard discovered the roadside Moon Fire, in an area of the Lassen National Forest under an evacuation order for the fast-growing Dixie Fire. Maynard continued to camp in the forest despite emergency closure orders, and on August 7 agents discovered the Ranch and Conard fires burning near Maynard's campsite. Tracking data supported his presence at the scenes of ignition.

Maynard was arrested on August 7 by a California Highway Patrol officer, and indicted by a federal grand jury on November 18, 2021. Multiple people who encountered Maynard prior to his arrest and indictment expressed concerns about his mental state. Maynard's arrest, and that of Alexandra Souverneva a month later for starting the destructive Fawn Fire near Redding, prompted many to downplay the role of climate change and spread rumors and conspiracy theories about the causes of California wildfires. On February 1, 2024, Maynard pled guilty to three charges of arson. He was scheduled to be sentenced May 9, 2024 and faced fines of up to $250,000 for each fire and up to 20 years in prison. Ultimately, he was sentenced to five years and three months in prison, three years of supervised release, and was ordered to pay $13,081 in restitution for the three counts of arson on federal property.

=== September ===
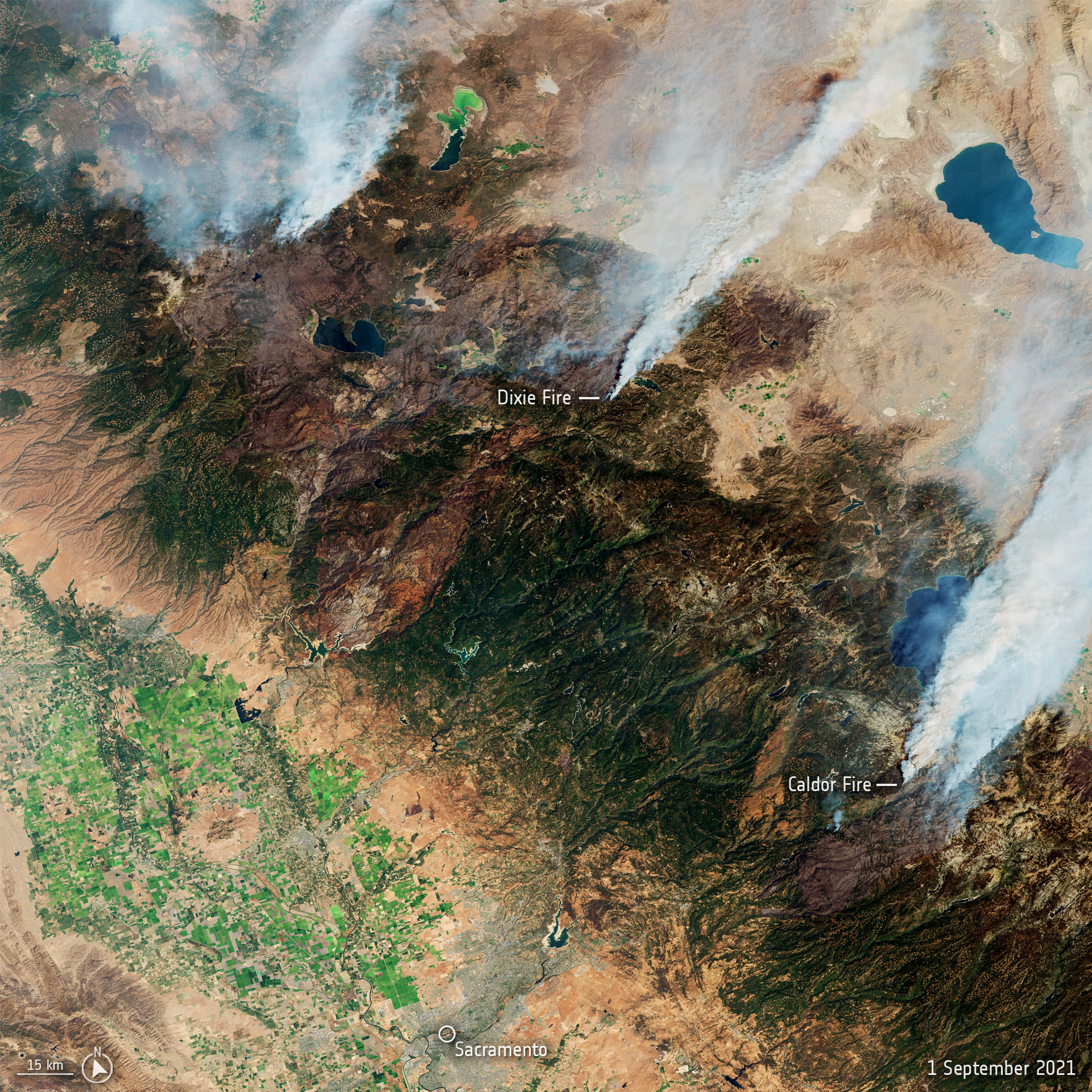
The Devil's Punchbowl is just above and left of the dot of the first letter i in "Dixie" at 40.0179°N 120.8022°W.

The fire continued burning in the two management zones, the East Zone and West Zone. The eastern zone was mostly Plumas National Forest and the western zone was mostly Lassen Volcanic National Park and Lassen National Forest. The eastern zone extended to the escarpment south of Milford, where firefighters continued efforts to protect the town. By September 6, containment had reached 57 percent, but extreme fire activity continued and strong winds pushed the fire down off the escarpment to containment lines at the base of the slope. By September 10, fire crews were "mopping up" heat near the fire's edge south of Milford. In the West Zone, winds pushed the fire to the northeast, threatening the communities of Hat Creek and Old Station. Old Station was put under an evacuation order on September 8, and by the 10th, the fire had jumped containment lines and crossed Highway 44. Fire crews began using Union Pacific Railroad's fire train, which can deliver 30,000 gallons of water per load to fill water tenders. On September 9 the weather became more favorable, especially in the West Zone, with calm winds, overnight temperatures down into the 30s, up to a quarter-inch of rain, and rising humidity resulting in minimal fire activity. Favorable conditions were expected to continue throughout the week. As of September 13, the few remaining areas of persistent heat and flames were all within the interior of the burned area, and containment had increased to 86 percent by September 16. By September 18, the fire was 88 percent contained; firefighters reinforced containment lines and monitored/patrolled the fire for hot spots within the fire lines in advance of a red flag warning. Rain and work by firefighters on September 19 kept fire activity within the existing perimeter, and the increase in reported acreage on that date reflected area burned within that perimeter. On September 22, containment reached 95 percent and firefighters successfully completed containment around the last portion of uncontained fire in the Devil's Punchbowl area of the East Zone. On October 1, Devil's Punchbowl was devoid of heat based on infrared data and InciWeb indicated a 94 percent overall containment for the Dixie Fire (East and West Zone).

Perimeter of Dixie Fire

The Dixie Fire resulted in the most expensive wildfire suppression effort in United States history, in part due to a reliance on contracted and higher-paid local and private firefighters. The final cost of containing the Dixie Fire came to $637.4 million, split between multiple agencies such as CAL FIRE and the U.S. Forest Service.

=== Detailed chronologies and visualizations ===
- Anatomy of a wildfire: How the Dixie Fire became the largest blaze of a devastating summer
- See How the Dixie Fire Created Its Own Weather: This year's largest blaze generated powerful storm clouds. We show you in 3-D.
- Inside the Massive and Costly Fight to Contain the Dixie Fire

== US Army support ==
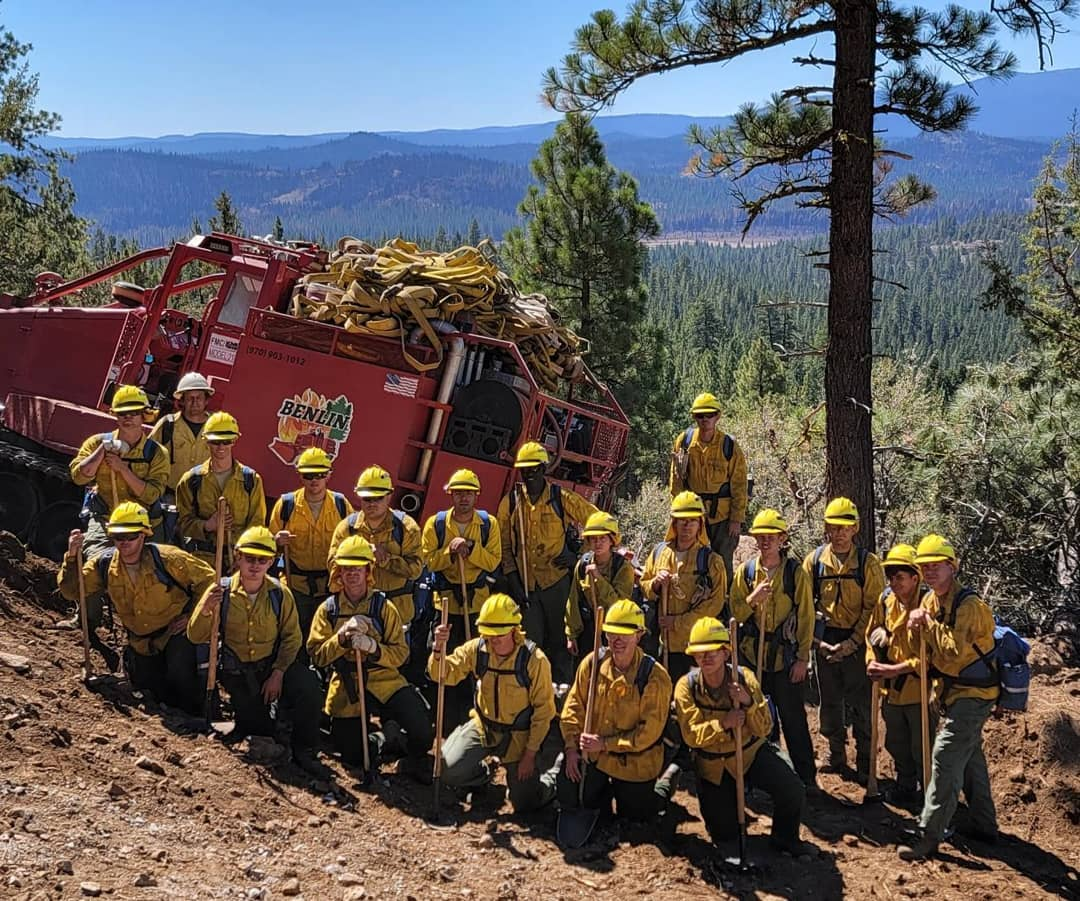
23rd Brigade Engineer Battalion soldiers during the Dixie Fire

In August 2021, 200 soldiers from the 23rd Brigade Engineer Battalion and 2-3 Infantry Battalion stationed at Fort Lewis, Washington, were activated to curb the spread of the fire.

Soldiers from each battalion, in addition to firefighting, were tasked with protecting local indigenous cultural sites threatened by the fire.

== Effects ==
In context, the Dixie Fire burned almost a million acres, the largest wildfire acreage loss in modern California history.

=== Casualties ===
Three firefighters were injured on the Dixie Fire. One fatality was reported: a firefighter died due to COVID-19 illness suspected to have been contracted during suppression efforts.

=== Damage ===
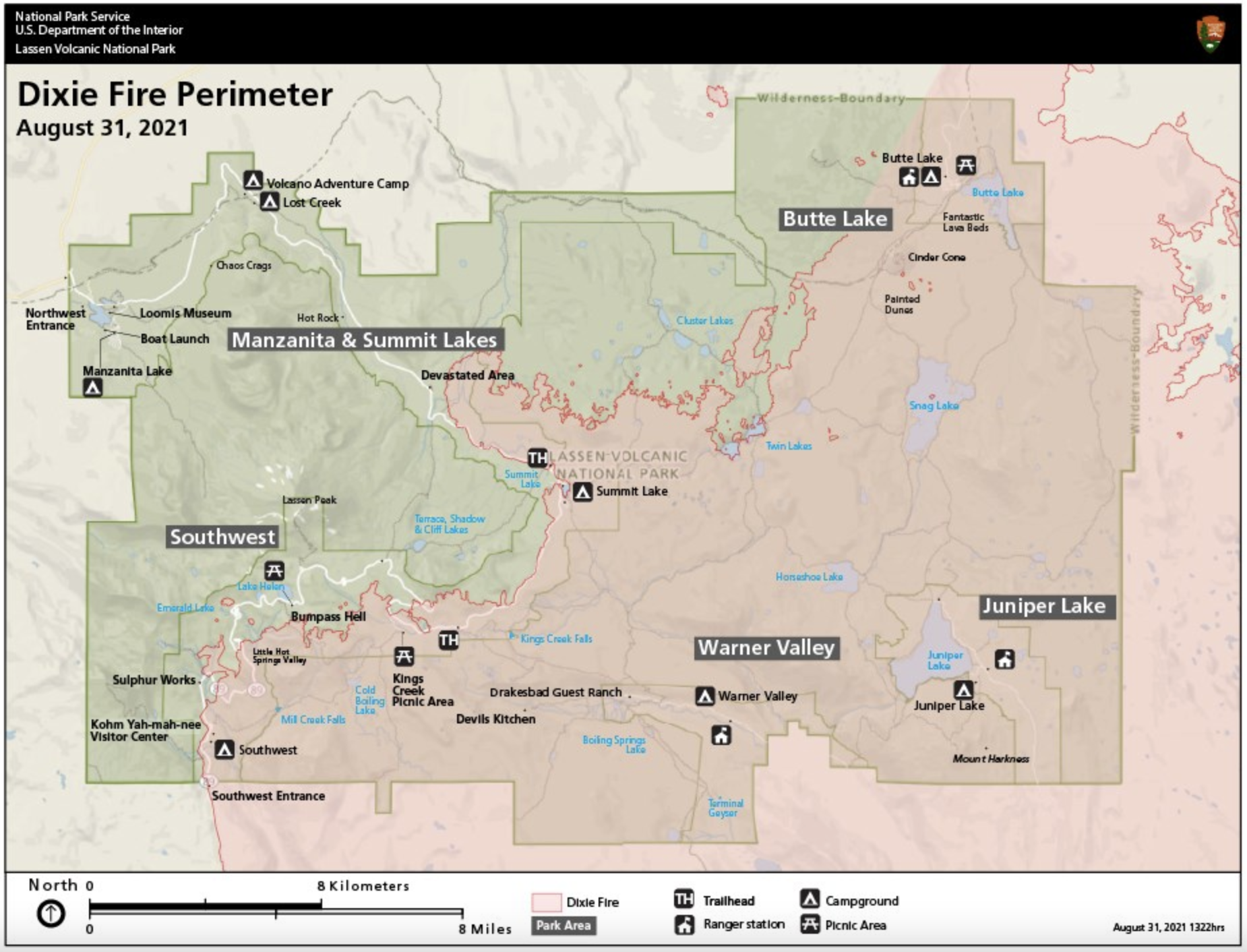
Fire perimeter in Lassen Volcanic National Park as of August 31

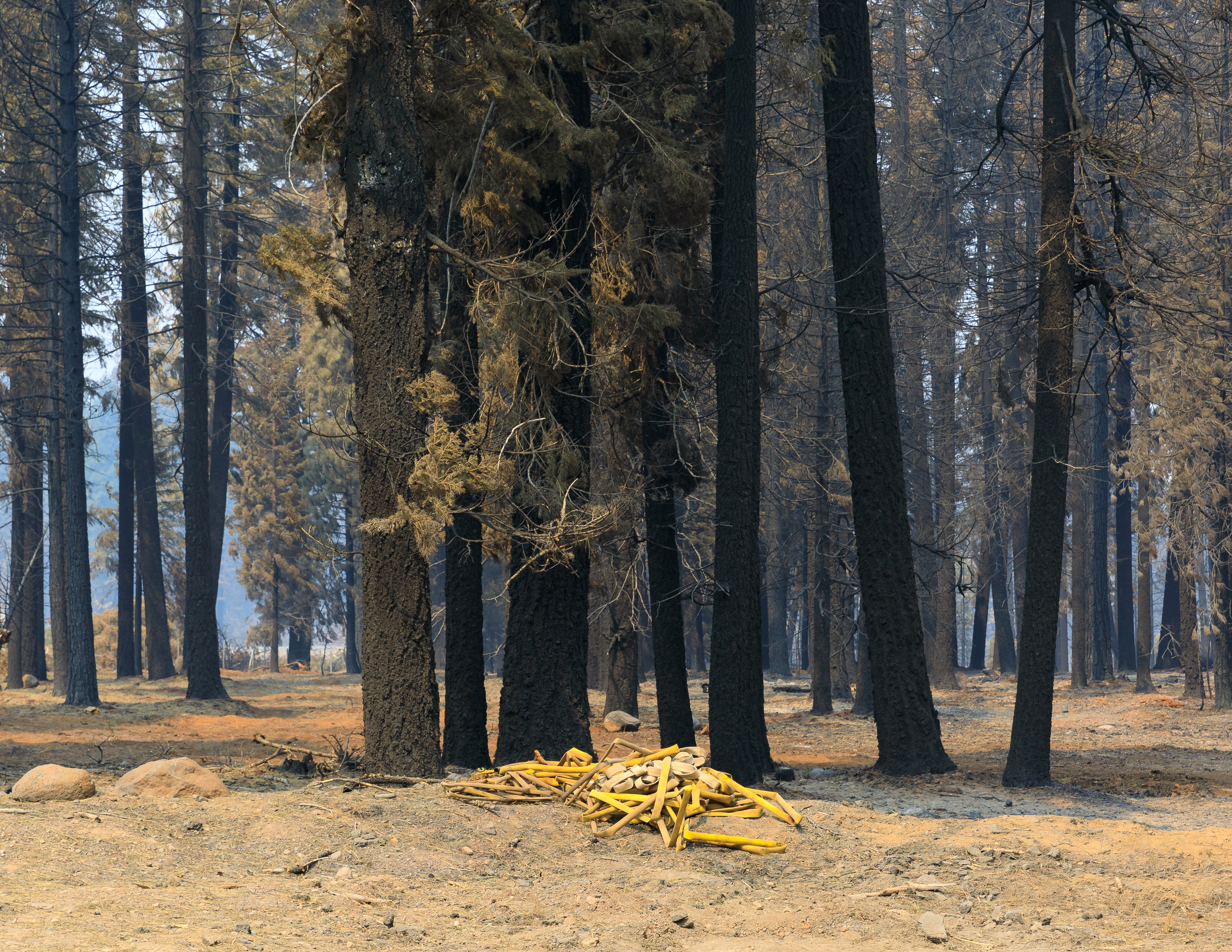
Charred trees near Lake Almanor where firefighters had set a controlled back burn in order to save structures along the shore

The Dixie Fire destroyed 1,329 structures, of which at least 600 were residential. It damaged another 96 structures, and threatened 14,000 more. Communities largely destroyed by the fire included Greenville, Canyondam, and Indian Falls. In downtown Greenville the fire destroyed multiple historic buildings, many dating back to the 19th-century California Gold Rush. In Lassen National Park, the fire destroyed the Mount Harkness Fire Lookout and possibly other historic facilities within the park. The Tásmam Koyóm valley that was returned to the Maidu as part of the Pacific Gas and Electric Company bankruptcy in 2019 lost a historic stagecoach stop and suffered damages to its cattle-grazing and culturally significant planting areas.

=== Closures and evacuations ===
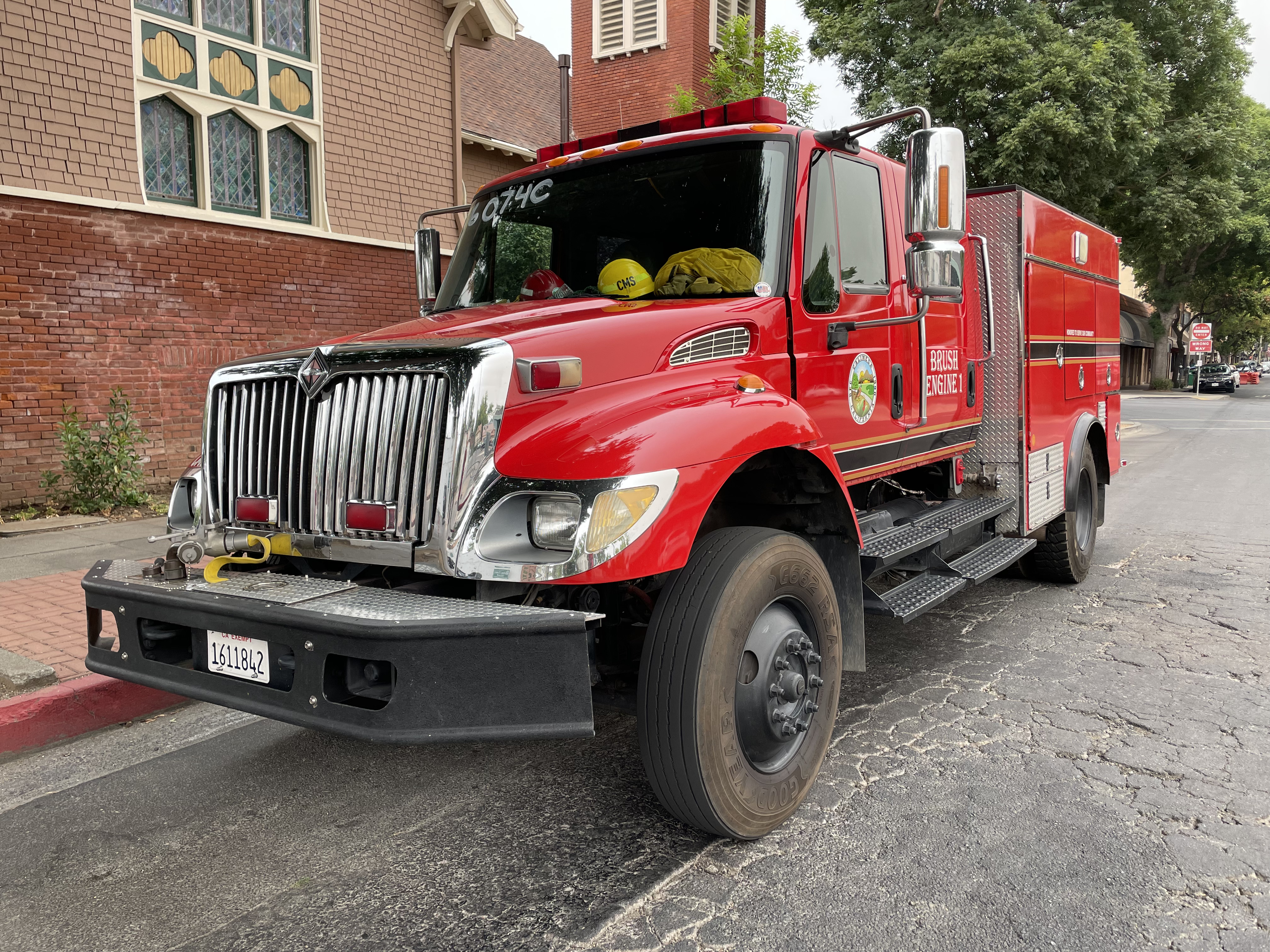
Fire engine from Calimesa in downtown Chico during the Dixie Fire. As of July 24, about 4,266 firefighters were on the fire with 365 engines, 60 water tenders, 31 helicopters, 76 hand crews and 100 dozers.

On July 21, evacuation orders were issued for Butte Meadows in northeast Butte County and the west shore of Lake Almanor in Plumas County, while the east shore of Almanor and the town of Chester were under an evacuation warning. By July 24 evacuation orders were extended to Greenville, Crescent Mills, Taylorsville, and other communities along the Feather River canyons east and west of the fire, as well as Bucks Lake, Meadow Valley and parts of Quincy. As of July 25, about 7,400 people in Plumas County and 100 people in Butte County had been evacuated.

On August 3, Chester, Lake Almanor Peninsula and Hamilton Branch were evacuated as the fire advanced north toward Lassen National Park. On August 4 evacuation orders were issued in southwest Lassen County, particularly the areas south of Highway 44 and Mountain Meadows Reservoir, and evacuation warnings for Westwood and Pine Town. The total number of people forced to evacuate by the Dixie Fire reached more than 9,500 by August 9.

Lassen Community College served as a major evacuation site for residents of Plumas and Lassen Counties. Meanwhile, dormitory residents and student athletes at the college were evacuated to Humboldt State University. On August 16, Lassen County Sheriff Officials identified and forcibly evacuated residents of Plumas County from their camp at Lassen College. The Lassen County Health and Social Services Department later clarified that evacuees from all counties were welcome at Lassen College and the Lassen County Sheriff's Department promised to investigate the circumstances surrounding the removal of evacuees.

On July 24, Lassen National Park was closed to backcountry camping, and the Warner Valley and Juniper Lake areas were closed to all visitors. On August 5, the entire park was closed to visitors as the Dixie Fire burned into the eastern side of the park.

As of August 2, State Routes 32, 89, 147, 36, and 70 were closed to through traffic in the area of the Dixie Fire.

=== Air pollution ===
Smoke from the Dixie Fire caused unhealthy air quality throughout the Western United States. On August 6 in Salt Lake City the small airborne particulates (PM_{2.5}) level spiked to more than three times the federal standard, and caused the area to temporarily have the worst air quality in the world. The particulates causing the poor air quality in Utah came from several Western US wildfires, including the Dixie Fire. In early August, the Colorado Department of Public Health and Environment reported unhealthy air pollution levels in much of the state.

While not attributed specifically to the Dixie Fire, air quality in New York City was poorer than usual during the summer of 2021 due to wildfires in the western U.S.

== Legal proceedings ==
On January 4, 2022, Cal Fire determined that "the Dixie Fire was caused by a tree contacting electrical distribution lines owned and operated by Pacific Gas and Electric (PG&E) located west of Cresta Dam." Cal Fire forwarded the investigative report to the Butte County District Attorney's office, the same prosecutor's office that prosecuted PG&E in 2018 following the Camp Fire. PG&E pled guilty to 85 felonies in that case. Though the 2018 and 2021 fires were both ignited in the Feather River canyon (ignitions were about five miles (8.0 km) apart), the Camp Fire was caused by a faulty hook on a transmission tower that resulted in a power line touching the ground, while the Dixie Fire was caused by a "healthy green tree" falling and striking distribution lines.

On April 11, 2022, PG&E consented to pay $55 million in civil penalties and other costs to multiple California counties, in order to avoid criminal prosecution for causing the Dixie Fire and the 2019 Kincade Fire. Prosecutors agreed to the deal because of the minute criminal fines they could have extracted from the company (barely more than $300,000). Attorney General of California Rob Bonta declined to bring any legal action against PG&E. On January 17, 2023, Shasta, Plumas, Lassen, Butte and Tehama counties and five other public entities impacted by the Dixie Fire announced that they had reached a $24 million settlement with PG&E. The settlement did not mark an admission of liability by PG&E, which stated that the purpose of the settlement was to avoid future litigation.

In October 2023 the California Public Utilities Commission (CPUC) proposed a $45 million fine for PG&E, comprising $2.5 million to be paid into California's general fund, $2.5 million to go to Native American tribes affected by the fire, and $40 million to be spent by PG&E on digitizing records (the company's neglect in transitioning records from paper to electronic had been held up as a factor in its failure to inspect power lines and hazardous trees). The commission was scheduled to vote on the proposed fine in November. In late January 2024, PG&E fully agreed to the proposed $45 million settlement.

== Growth and containment status ==
Fire containment status Gray: contained; Red: active; %: percent contained;
| Date | Area burned acres (km^{2}) | Containment |
|---|---|---|
| Jul 14 | 2,200 (9) | |
| Jul 16 | 8,754 (35) | |
| Jul 17 | 9,847 (40) | |
| Jul 18 | 15,074 (61) | |
| Jul 19 | 30,074 (122) | |
| Jul 20 | 59,984 (243) | |
| Jul 21 | 85,479 (346) | |
| Jul 22 | 103,910 (421) | |
| Jul 23 | 167,430 (678) | |
| Jul 24 | 181,289 (734) | |
| Jul 25 | 190,625 (771) | |
| Jul 26 | 197,487 (799) | |
| Jul 27 | 212,799 (861) | |
| Jul 28 | 217,581 (881) | |
| Jul 29 | 221,504 (896) | |
| Jul 30 | 240,595 (974) | |
| Jul 31 | 244,388 (989) | |
| Aug 1 | 248,570 (1,006) | |
| Aug 2 | 249,635 (1,010) | |
| Aug 3 | 253,052 (1,024) | |
| Aug 4 | 274,139 (1,109) | |
| Aug 5 | 322,502 (1,305) | |
| Aug 6 | 432,813 (1,752) | |
| Aug 7 | 446,723 (1,808) | |
| Aug 8 | 463,477 (1,876) | |
| Aug 9 | 489,287 (1,980) | |
| Aug 10 | 487,764 (1,974) | |
| Aug 11 | 505,413 (2,045) | |
| Aug 12 | 515,756 (2,087) | |
| Aug 13 | 517,945 (2,096) | |
| Aug 14 | 540,581 (2,188) | |
| Aug 15 | 554,816 (2,245) | |
| Aug 16 | 569,707 (2,306) | |
| Aug 17 | 604,511 (2,446) | |
| Aug 18 | 635,728 (2,573) | |
| Aug 19 | 678,369 (2,745) | |
| Aug 20 | 700,630 (2,835) | |
| Aug 21 | 714,219 (2,890) | |
| Aug 22 | 721,298 (2,919) | |
| Aug 23 | 725,821 (2,937) | |
| Aug 24 | 731,310 (2,960) | |
| Aug 25 | 735,064 (2,975) | |
| Aug 26 | 747,091 (3,023) | |
| Aug 27 | 750,672 (3,038) | |
| Aug 28 | 756,768 (3,063) | |
| Aug 30 | 771,183 (3,121) | |
| Aug 31 | 807,396 (3,267) | |
| Sep 1 | 844,081 (3,416) | |
| Sep 2 | 859,457 (3,478) | |
| Sep 3 | 868,781 (3,516) | |
| Sep 4 | 885,954 (3,585) | |
| Sep 5 | 893,852 (3,617) | |
| Sep 6 | 910,495 (3,685) | |
| Sep 7 | 917,579 (3,713) | |
| Sep 8 | 922,192 (3,732) | |
| Sep 9 | 927,320 (3,753) | |
| Sep 10 | 950,591 (3,847) | |
| Sep 11 | 959,253 (3,882) | |
| Sep 12 | 960,213 (3,886) | |
| Sep 13 | 960,335 (3,886) | |
| Sep 14 | 960,470 (3,887) | |
| Sep 15 | 960,470 (3,887) | |
| Sep 16 | 960,470 (3,887) | |
| Sep 17 | 960,581 (3,887) | |
| Sep 18 | 960,641 (3,888) | |
| Sep 19 | 963,301 (3,898) | |
| Sep 20 | 963,195 (3,898) | |
| Sep 21 | 963,276 (3,898) | |
| Sep 22 | 963,276 (3,898) | |
| Sep 26 | 963,276 (3,898) | |
| Sep 27 | 963,276 (3,898) | |
| Sep 28 | 963,309 (3,898) | |
| Sep 29 | 963,309 (3,898) | |
| Sep 30 | 963,309 (3,898) | |
| Oct 01 | 963,309 (3,898) | |
| Oct 02 | 963,309 (3,898) | |
| Oct 17 | 963,309 (3,898) | |
| Oct 18 | 963,309 (3,898) | |
| Oct 19 | 963,309 (3,898) | |
| Oct 20 | 963,309 (3,898) | |
| Oct 21 | 963,309 (3,898) | |
| Oct 22 | 963,309 (3,898) | |
| Oct 23 | 963,309 (3,898) | |
| Oct 24 | 963,309 (3,898) | |
| Oct 25 | 963,309 (3,898) | |

== See also ==
- Moonlight Fire – 2007 wildfire in Lassen County, partially re-burned by the Dixie Fire
- Walker Fire – 2019 wildfire in Plumas County, partially re-burned by the Dixie Fire
- 2020 Lassen County wildfires – the Dixie Fire burned in or near these fires' footprints, including the Sheep Fire
- Beckwourth Complex fires – 2021 wildfire in Plumas and Lassen counties, immediately south of Dixie Fire
- Mosquito Fire – largest California wildfire of 2022, possibly caused by PG&E equipment
