= Spanish Creek (British Columbia) =

Coordinates: 52°39′28″N 121°28′34″W

Spanish Creek is a creek in eastern British Columbia, Canada. It flows north into the Cariboo River southwest of Cariboo Lake.

== Campground ==
Spanish Creek Campground is located on Highway 70 just east of the Highway 89 intersection (where Banish Creek and Indian Creek merge to create the east branch of the North Fork Feather River). The campground is adjacent to Spanish Creek, and includes a swimming hole. The campground has been upgraded.

The campground is in the Plumas National Forest, where many streams and lakes, canyons, mountain valleys, meadows, and peaks are located. Spanish Creek is in the Feather River Canyon, at an elevation of 2,000 feet.

In the Plumas National Forest, Spanish Creek campground is a few miles from Indian Falls. Some have said that the mist created by the falls resembles a feather, thus the name Feather River. Southeast on Highway 70 is the high Sierra town of Quincy. The Butterfly Valley Botanical Area is close to the campground.
