= Spanish Creek =

Spanish Creek may refer to:

- Spanish Creek (British Columbia)
- Spanish Creek (Plumas County, California)
- Spanish Creek (Georgia)
