= Red Clover Creek =

Location
- Country: United States
- State: California
- Region: Plumas County

Physical characteristics
- Source: Horton Ridge, Sierra Nevada
  - coordinates: 39°52′45″N 120°20′17″W
  - elevation: 6,610 ft (2,010 m)
- Mouth: Last Chance Creek
  - coordinates: 40°03′28″N 120°40′08″W
  - elevation: 3,743 ft (1,141 m)

Basin features
- Tributaries
  - left: Crocker Creek
  - right: Dixie Creek

Red Clover Creek is a west-northwestward-flowing stream originating on Horton Ridge east of the Sierra Nevada crest in Plumas County, California, United States. It courses 27 miles (43 km) through Dotta Canyon and Red Clover Valley to its confluence with Last Chance Creek in Genesee Valley, just above its confluence with Indian Creek, which flows into the East Branch North Fork Feather River. The Red Clover Valley sits at an elevation of about 5,400 feet (1,600 m) and is located on the east side of the Sierra Nevada crest, approximately 60 miles (97 km) north of Truckee and 30 miles (48 km) east of Quincy.

== Development and recreation ==
Most of the Red Clover Creek Basin is uninhabited, although a few residences and vacation homes exist near the mouth in Genesee Valley. Most of the mountain and foothill lands are part of the Plumas National Forest and are managed by the U. S. Forest Service for timber production, wildlife management, grazing, recreation, and watershed management. There are no developed campgrounds along Red Clover Creek, however, there are several areas that offer suitable camping, and are frequented by campers, hunters, and fishermen. County Route 111, a dirt and gravel road, follows the creek from Red Clover Valley to Genesee Valley, and is referred to as the Genesee-Beckworth road.

Historically railroad tracks ran through the valley, providing transportation for logging, mining, and dairy.

== Watershed ==
The largest tributary watersheds are those of Crocker and Dixie Creeks. The upper and middle reaches are low gradient, alluvial valleys while the lower reach runs through a bouldered canyon.

Prior to 1880, the upper portion of Red Clover Creek, was as a low gradient, narrow channel with a well-developed riparian zone comprising hardwoods, sedges, and willows that protected the streambanks. It had a reputation as a good trout fishery. Heavy logging in the watershed, extirpation of beaver, as well as heavy sheep and cattle grazing which eliminate riparian vegetation, led to severe erosion in the creek. By 1985, the actively eroding channel was 50 to 60 feet wide and had vertically incised to a depth of ten feet. The erosion contributed large amounts of sediment to the North Fork Feather River system via Indian Creek.

== Ecology ==
After grazing removed riparian vegetation and extirpation of California Golden beaver (Castor canadensis subauratus) allowed erosion to incise the creek channel and lower the water table, the once-productive wet meadows converted to a dry sagebrush-dominated basin with minimal vegetation and little cover for fish. This area has been subject to multiple stream restoration efforts by the Plumas Corporation.

Recently novel physical evidence has demonstrated that beaver were native to the Sierra until at least the mid-nineteenth century, via radiocarbon dating of buried beaver dam wood uncovered by deep channel incision in two locations in the Red Clover Creek watershed.

Four species of fish are known to occur in Red Clover Creek, including rainbow trout (Oncorhynchus mykiss), brown trout (Salmo trutta), mountain sucker (Catostomus platyrhynchus) and speckled dace (Rhinichthys osculus).

== See also ==
- Beaver in the Sierra Nevada
