= Thompson Peak =

Thompson Peak may refer to one of these mountain peaks:

- Thompson Peak (Arizona), a McDowell Mountains summit 20 miles from Phoenix with amateur and Maricopa County government radio towers accessible via a service road from Fountain Hills (33°38′39″N 111°48′44″W)
- Thompson Peak (Yavapai County, Arizona)
- Thompson Peak (El Dorado County, California)
- Thompson Peak (Plumas County, California), a summit of the Diamond Mountains in the northern Sierra Nevada (40.242585°N 120.517402°W)
- Thompson Peak (Trinity County, California), highest summit of the Salmon Mountains
- Thompson Peak (Tulare County, California)
- Thompson Peak (Tuolumne County, California)
- Thompson Peak (Bonneville County, Idaho)
- Thompson Peak (Idaho) - highest summit of the Sawtooth Mountains
- Thompson Peak (Madison County, Montana)
- Thompson Peak (Mineral County, Montana), in Mineral County, Montana
- Thompson Peak (Sanders County, Montana), highest summit of the Thompson Peaks (Montana)
- Thompson Peak (New Mexico)
- Thompson Peak (Oregon)
- Thompson Peak (Utah)
- Thompson Peak (Antarctica)
