= Antelope Dam (California) =

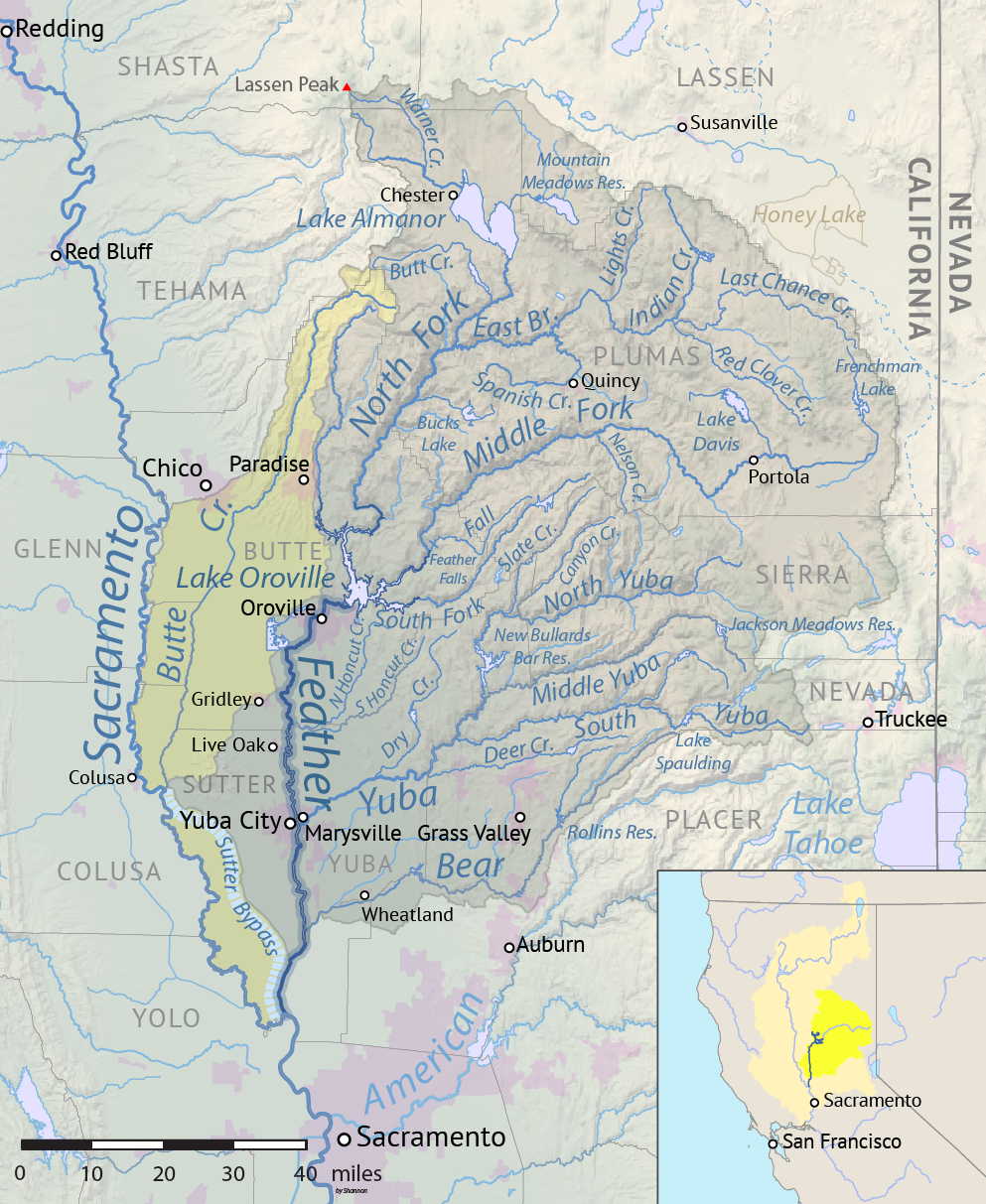
- Feather River watershed map, with Indian Creek and Antelope Reservoir towards the upper right
- Interactive map of Antelope Dam
- Location: Plumas County, California
- Coordinates: 40°10′51″N 120°36′27″W
- Opening date: 1964; 62 years ago

Dam and spillways
- Type of dam: Earthfill
- Impounds: Indian Creek
- Height: 113 ft (34 m)
- Length: 1,320 ft (400 m)
- Elevation at crest: 5,025 ft (1,532 m)
- Width (base): 30 ft (9.1 m)
- Dam volume: 380,000 yd^{3} (290,000 m^{3})

Reservoir
- Creates: Antelope Lake
- Total capacity: 22,566 acre⋅ft (27,835,000 m^{3})
- Catchment area: 71 mi^{2} (180 km^{2})
- Surface area: 931 acres (377 ha)
- Normal elevation: 5,007 ft (1,526 m)

Antelope Dam or Antelope Valley Dam (National ID # CA00037) is a dam in Plumas County, California, part of the California State Water Project.

The earthen dam was constructed in 1964 by the California Department of Water Resources with a height of 113 feet (34 m) and a length of 1,320 feet (400 m) at its crest. It impounds Indian Creek for water storage, recreation and wildlife conservation, part of the state's larger Upper Feather River Project. The dam is owned and operated by the Department. The site is surrounded by the Plumas National Forest.

The reservoir it creates, called Antelope Lake or Antelope Reservoir, has a water surface of 931 acres (377 ha), a forested shoreline of about 15 miles (24 km), a maximum capacity of 47,466 acre-feet (58,548,000 m^{3}), and a normal capacity of 22,566 acre-feet (27,835,000 m^{3}).

The major tributaries are Indian, Boulder, Lone Rock, Antelope, and Little Antelope Creeks.

The outlet is Indian Creek, a tributary of the East Branch North Fork Feather River.

The Antelope Complex, Moonlight, and Walker Fires all burned within the vicinity of the lake.

Recreation includes fishing (for stocked rainbow and brook trout, smallmouth bass, largemouth bass, and channel catfish), camping in the 194 campsites of the surrounding Antelope Lake Recreation Area, boating, swimming, hunting, and hiking.

== See also ==
- List of dams and reservoirs in California
- List of lakes in California
