= Lights Creek =

- Location of Lights Creek in California

Location
- Country: United States
- State: California

Physical characteristics
- Source: Diamond Mountains
  - coordinates: 40°18′40″N 120°44′15″W
  - elevation: 6,478 ft (1,974 m)
- Mouth: Indian Creek
  - location: Near Taylorsville
  - coordinates: 40°05′58″N 120°51′02″W
  - elevation: 3,514 ft (1,071 m)
- Length: 19 mi (31 km)
- Basin size: 57.6 sq mi (149 km^{2})
- Discharge
  - location: Near the mouth, at Taylorsville
  - average: 42.7 cu ft/s (1.21 m^{3}/s)
  - minimum: 1.43 cu ft/s (0.040 m^{3}/s)
  - maximum: 2,440 cu ft/s (69 m^{3}/s)

Lights Creek is a 19-mile (31 km) long stream in Plumas County, California and is a tributary of Indian Creek, part of the Feather River watershed.

The creek begins in the Diamond Mountains, near the border of Plumas and Lassen County. It flows in a south-southwesterly direction through a high mountain valley in the Plumas National Forest. About two-thirds of the way down from its source, it enters the North Arm of Indian Valley, which is used for farming and ranching. It joins Indian Creek on the right bank about a mile (1.6 km) north of Taylorsville.

== See also ==
- List of rivers of California
