= Tasikoyo, California =

Tasikoyo
- Former settlement
- Location in California
- Coordinates: 40°04′30″N 120°50′24″W
- Country: United States
- State: California
- County: Plumas
- Elevation: 3,553 ft (1,083 m)

Tasikoyo (also, To-si-ko-yo and Tusikweyo) is a former Maidu village in Plumas County, California, United States. It lay at an elevation of 3,553 feet (1,083 m). The site is now in Taylorsville.
