= Indian Creek (Plumas County, California) =

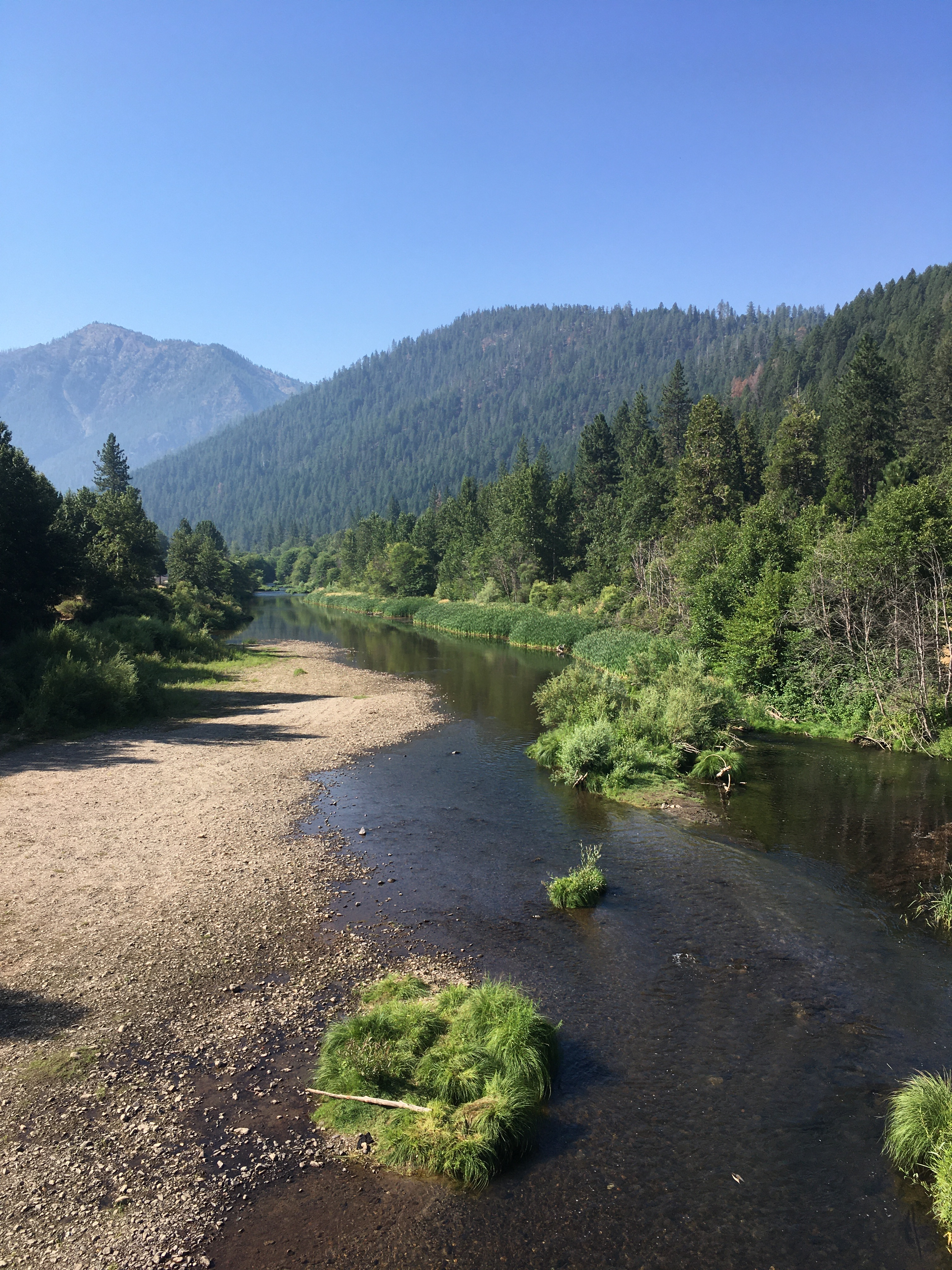
- Indian Creek at Taylorsville

- Location of Indian Creek in California

Location
- Country: United States
- State: California

Physical characteristics
- Source: Diamond Mountains
  - location: Plumas National Forest
  - coordinates: 40°18′34″N 120°41′36″W
  - elevation: 7,386 ft (2,251 m)
- Mouth: East Branch North Fork Feather River
  - location: Paxton
  - coordinates: 40°02′17″N 120°58′58″W
  - elevation: 2,966 ft (904 m)
- Length: 47 mi (76 km)
- Basin size: 739 sq mi (1,910 km^{2})
- Discharge
  - location: Crescent Mills
  - average: 537 cu ft/s (15.2 m^{3}/s)
  - minimum: 1.49 cu ft/s (0.042 m^{3}/s)
  - maximum: 40,000 cu ft/s (1,100 m^{3}/s)

Indian Creek is a major stream in the southern Cascade Range and northern Sierra Nevada of Plumas County, California and is part of the Feather River system. The creek is 47 miles (76 km) long, flowing through a series of small towns and farming valleys in a rural, mountainous area.

The creek arises in the Diamond Mountains, in the Plumas National Forest about 7 miles (11 km) south of Susanville. It flows southeast into Antelope Lake, a reservoir impounded by Antelope Valley Dam. Below the dam it flows south to its confluence with Last Chance Creek, then flows west through the Genesee Valley and the town of Genesee. It turns north, passing through Indian Valley, where it receives Lights Creek and Wolf Creek and passes a few miles south of Greenville, then flows southwest past Indian Falls, where it joins Spanish Creek to form the East Branch North Fork Feather River. A short distance west of here, the East Branch joins the North Fork Feather River at Belden, about 35 miles (56 km) upstream of Lake Oroville.

SR 89 follows the lower part of Indian Creek and is known as the "Scenic Byway Link", connecting the Feather River National Scenic Byway (SR 70 west of Quincy) to the Volcanic Legacy National Scenic Byway (toward Lassen Volcanic National Park). The area provides recreational opportunities including fishing, bicycling and viewing fall colors.

== See also ==
- List of rivers of California
