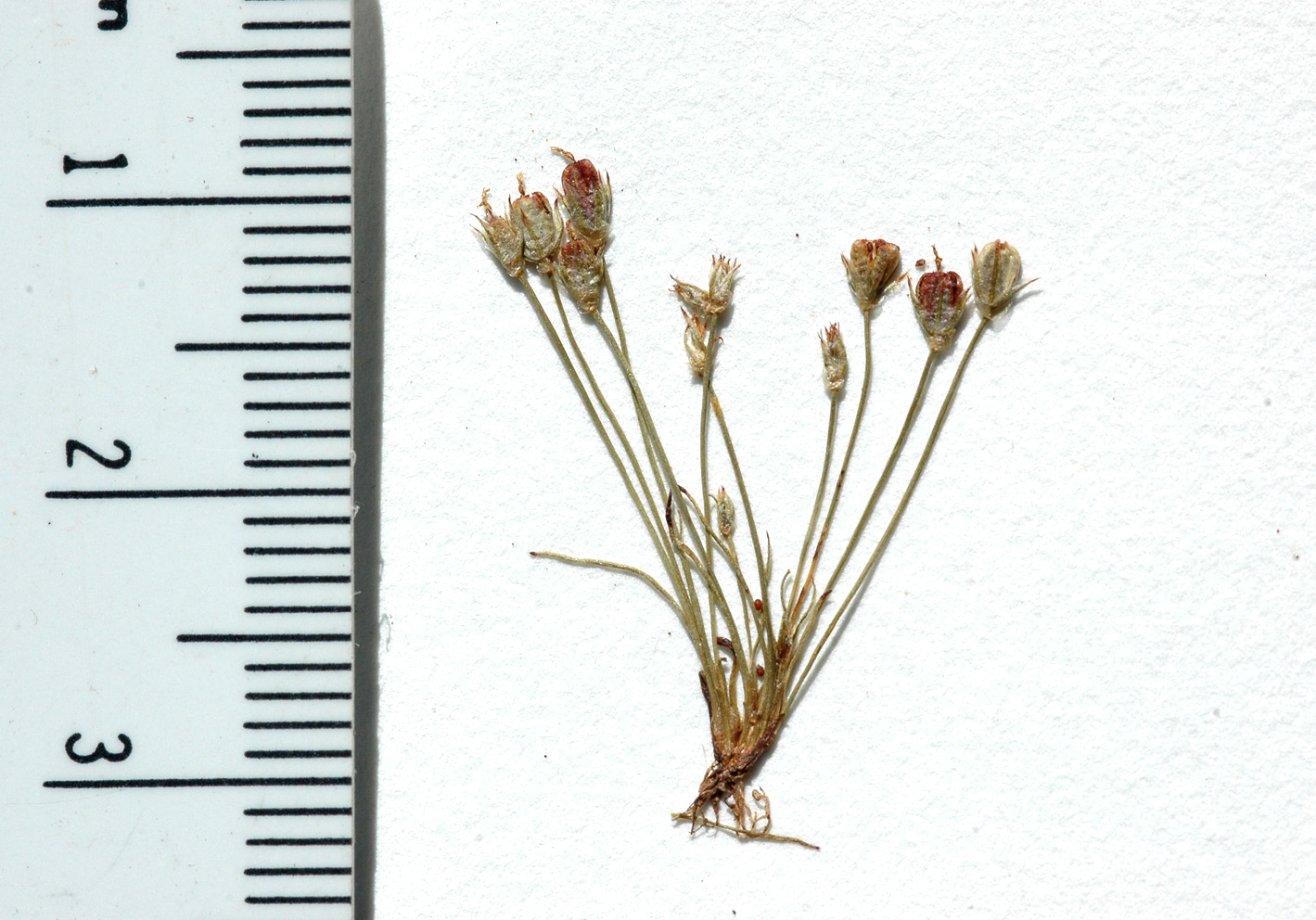

Conservation status
- Vulnerable (NatureServe)

Scientific classification
- Kingdom: Plantae
- Clade: Tracheophytes
- Clade: Angiosperms
- Clade: Monocots
- Clade: Commelinids
- Order: Poales
- Family: Juncaceae
- Genus: Juncus
- Species: J. luciensis

Binomial name
- Juncus luciensis Ertter

= Juncus luciensis =

Species of grass

Juncus luciensis is a species of rush known by the common name Santa Lucia dwarf rush. It is endemic to California, where it is uncommon.

This species is an annual herb growing just a few centimeters tall. It is yellowish green in color. The leaves are up to 1.5 centimeters long. The inflorescence contains one or two flowers with yellow-green tepals. The fruit is a greenish or sometimes red-tinged capsule containing seeds which are no more than 0.4 millimeters long.

This plant can be found only in California, where it occurs in the Peninsular Ranges and the Transverse Ranges, as well as the Santa Lucia and Diamond Mountains further north. Here it grows in moist and wet areas such as vernal pools, seeps, streambanks, and meadows.
