= East Branch North Fork Feather River =

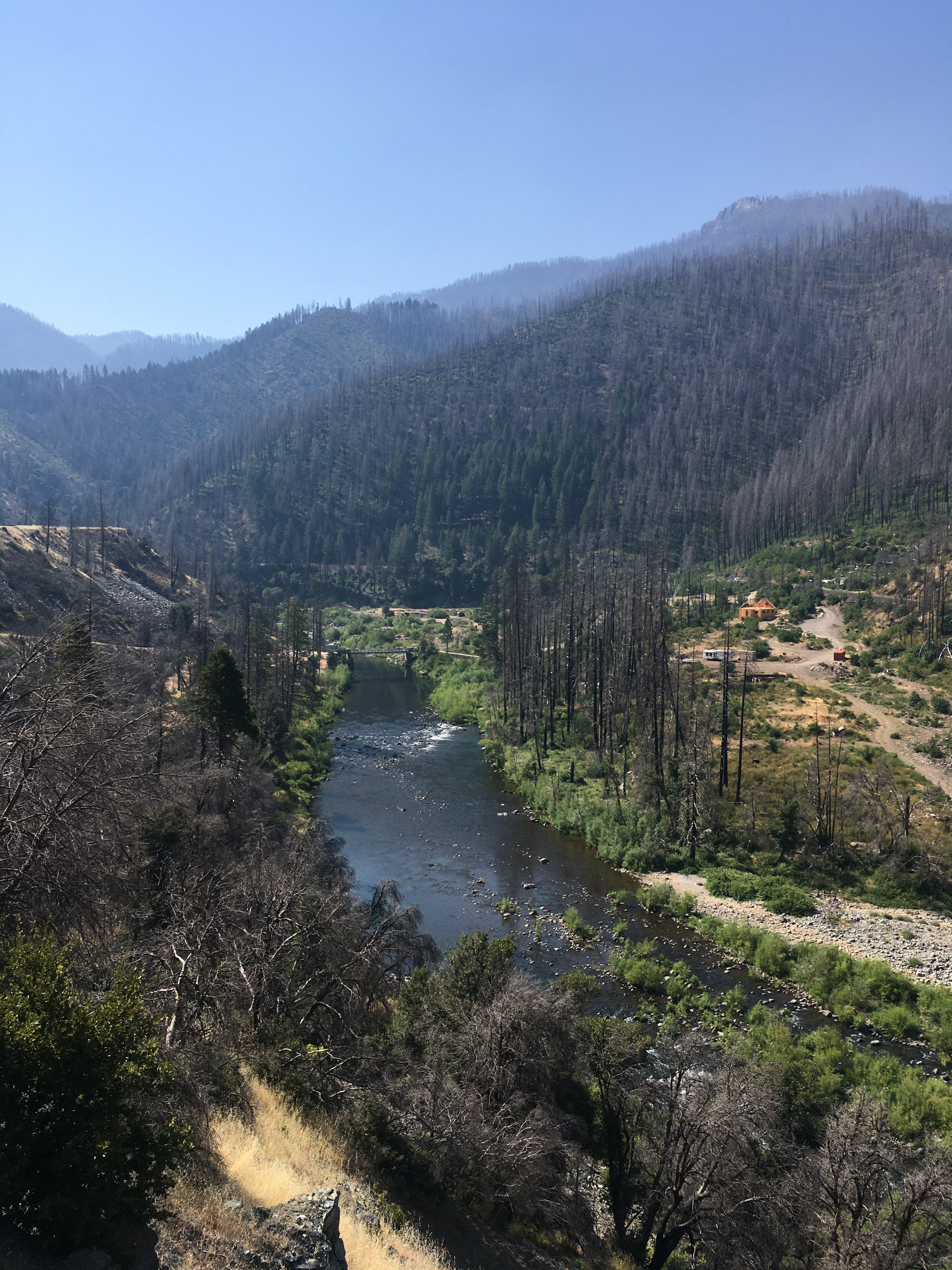
- View of East Branch from SR 70

Location
- Country: United States
- State: California
- Region: East Branch North Fork Feather Watershed

Physical characteristics
- Source confluence: Indian & Spanish creeks
  - elevation: 2,893 ft (882 m)
- Mouth: North Fork Feather River
  - coordinates: 40°00′51″N 121°13′32″W
  - elevation: 2,274 ft (693 m)
- Length: 18.1 mi (29.1 km)
- Basin size: 1,010 mi^{2} (2,600 km^{2})
- Discharge
  - location: North Fork Feather River
  - average: 1,039 cu ft/s (29.4 m^{3}/s)
  - minimum: 30.5 cu ft/s (0.86 m^{3}/s)
  - maximum: 88,800 cu ft/s (2,510 m^{3}/s)

The East Branch North Fork Feather River is a left tributary of the North Fork Feather River in the northern Sierra Nevada, Plumas County, California, United States. Primarily within the Plumas National Forest, its course extends from Paxton (north of Quincy) to Belden.

== Course ==
The East Branch is formed by the confluence of Indian Creek and Spanish Creek just upstream of Paxton. Indian Creek and Spanish Creek drain an extensive watershed along about 46 miles (74 km) of the Sierra Crest in eastern Plumas County, along its border with Lassen County. Indian Creek is 47 miles (76 km) long, but is 71 miles (114 km) long measured to the head of its tributary Last Chance Creek. Spanish Creek, the smaller of the two, is about 28 miles (45 km) long.

From the confluence, the East Branch winds west for 18.1 miles (29.1 km) through a steep and narrow canyon until its confluence with the North Fork next to Caribou Rd (40°00'49.9"N 121°13'32.4"W), about 60 miles (97 km) northeast of Oroville. The river canyon is an important transportation corridor, forming route for SR 70, which parallels the north bank of the river, and for the Union Pacific Railroad's Feather River Route on the south bank. The Feather River Route was originally constructed between 1906 and 1909 while the highway was built in the 1920s.

There are several large alluvial valleys in the East Branch watershed. Indian Creek flows through Indian Valley, which includes the communities of Greenville and Taylorsville. Spanish Creek flows through the American Valley, which includes Quincy, the county seat of Plumas County. Settlers drained the valley's wet meadows for cattle and hay production, and its stream channels are deeply incised (beavers were nearly eliminated).

== See also ==
- List of rivers of California
