= Last Chance Creek (Plumas County, California) =

Stream in Plumas County, United States of America

- Location of Last Chance Creek in California

Location
- Country: United States
- State: California

Physical characteristics
- Source: Diamond Mountains
  - location: West of Doyle
  - coordinates: 40°00′47″N 121°12′10″W
  - elevation: 6,737 ft (2,053 m)
- Mouth: Indian Creek
  - location: Near Genesee
  - coordinates: 40°03′57″N 120°40′34″W
  - elevation: 3,720 ft (1,130 m)
- Length: 38 mi (61 km)

Last Chance Creek is a major stream, 38 miles (61 kilometres) long, in Plumas County, California, United States and is part of the Feather River system. It originates near Meadow View Peak in the Diamond Mountains, part of the Sierra Nevada, in the Plumas National Forest about 5 miles (8.0 km) west of Doyle. It flows generally northwest through uninhabited National Forest lands then turns southwest, then due west at the confluence with Mo Bisipi Creek (formerly known as Squaw Queen Creek). From there it flows west to join with Red Clover Creek, its main tributary, before emptying into Indian Creek east of Genesee. Indian Creek is a tributary of the East Branch of the North Fork Feather River.

In terms of river mileage Last Chance Creek is the uppermost source of the Feather River. From the head of Last Chance Creek water flows 204 miles (328 km) to the confluence of the Feather and Sacramento Rivers northwest of Sacramento.

== See also ==
- List of rivers of California
