= Butterfly Valley (disambiguation) =

Butterfly Valley may refer to:

== Places ==
- Butterfly Valley, a valley in north of Lai Chi Kok in New Kowloon of Hong Kong
- Butterfly Valley, Fethiye, a valley in Fethiye district of Muğla Province, Turkey
- Butterfly Valley Botanical Area, a protected botanical area in the northern Sierra Nevada, in Quincy of northeastern California, USA
- Valley of the Butterflies, Petaloudes Valley, Rhodes

== Other uses ==
- Butterfly Valley: A Requiem, a book of poetry by the Danish writer Inger Christensen
