= Spanish Creek (Plumas County, California) =

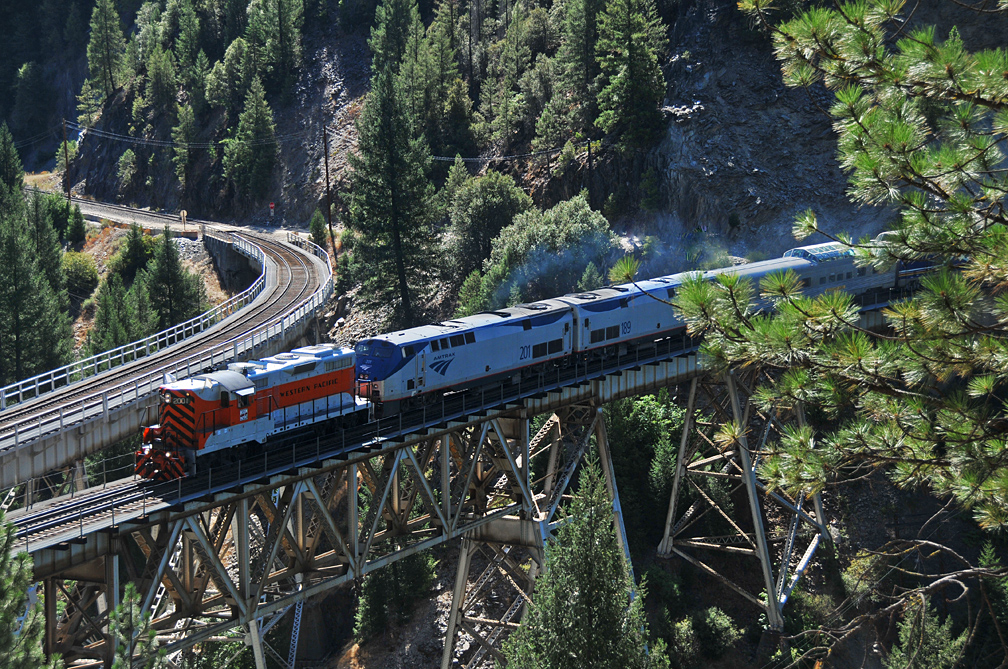
- Keddie Wye bridges at Spanish Creek Canyon

- Location of Spanish Creek in California

Location
- Country: United States
- State: California

Physical characteristics
- Source: Sierra Nevada
  - location: Plumas National Forest
  - coordinates: 39°58′06″N 121°08′32″W
  - elevation: 5,817 ft (1,773 m)
- Mouth: East Branch North Fork Feather River
  - location: Paxton
  - coordinates: 40°02′18″N 120°58′59″W
  - elevation: 2,900 ft (880 m)
- Length: 28 mi (45 km)

Spanish Creek is a stream in the Sierra Nevada of Plumas County, California and is a tributary of the Feather River system.

== Background ==
It flows east from headwaters in the Plumas National Forest, through Meadow Valley to Quincy where it traverses the American Valley. At the east end of the valley it turns north, flowing through a canyon towards Paxton where it joins with Indian Creek to form the East Branch North Fork Feather River.

The Keddie Wye, a rail junction on the Union Pacific Railroad and popular trainspotting site is located near Keddie and consists of twin bridges across Spanish Creek. It was originally built in 1909 as part of the Feather River Route.

== See also ==
- List of rivers of California
