= Moonlight Fire =

2007 wildfire in Northern California

- Part of the 2007 California wildfires
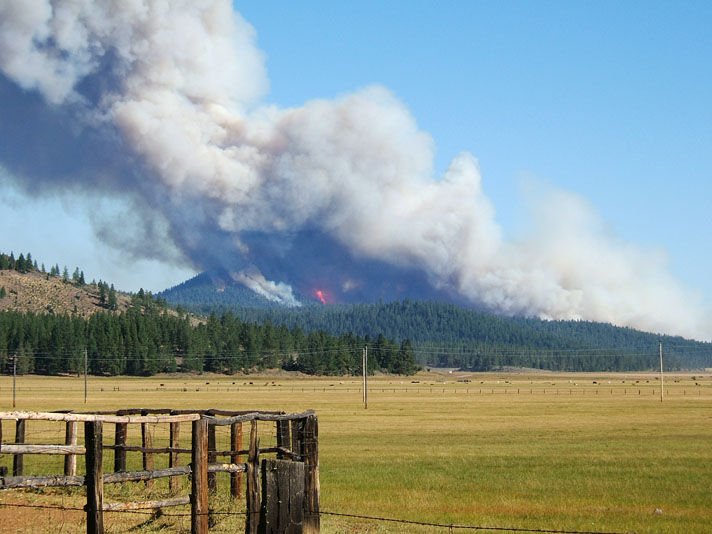
- The Moonlight Fire on September 3, viewed from Highway 36.
- Date: September 3, 2007 –; September 19, 2007
- Location: Plumas National Forest, Plumas County, California
- Coordinates: 40.22791°N 120.84710°W

Statistics
- Burned area: 64,997 acres (26,303 ha; 102 sq mi; 263 km^{2})

Impacts
- Deaths: 0
- Injuries: 34
- Structures destroyed: 7
- Cost: $31.5 million; (equivalent to about $45.8 million in 2024)

Map
- The location of fire in California's Lassen County

The 2007 Moonlight Fire was a large wildfire that burned near Westwood in Lassen County, California. The fire, which started on September 3, scorched 64,997 acres (26,303 hectares) before being declared contained on September 19. Approximately 2,300 firefighters were involved in fighting the fire. Strong winds pushed smoke to the Sacramento Valley, Bay Area, Nevada and Idaho. In Plumas County, 500 homes were threatened by the Moonlight Fire; 100 residences were evacuated near Greenville in the North Arm area of Indian Valley, as the wild fire was still raging in the Plumas National Forest.

== Progression ==
The Moonlight Fire began on Labor Day, September 3, 2007. InciWeb records that the Northern California Incident Management Team 1 declared the fire fully contained on September 16, and fully controlled on September 24, 2007. The corresponding Cal Fire page says that the Moonlight Fire was declared fully contained on September 19. Firefighting costs amounted to $31.5 million.

== Effects ==
The Moonlight Fire resulted in zero fatalities and 34 injuries. The fire destroyed seven structures: two residences and five outbuildings. One other outbuilding was damaged.

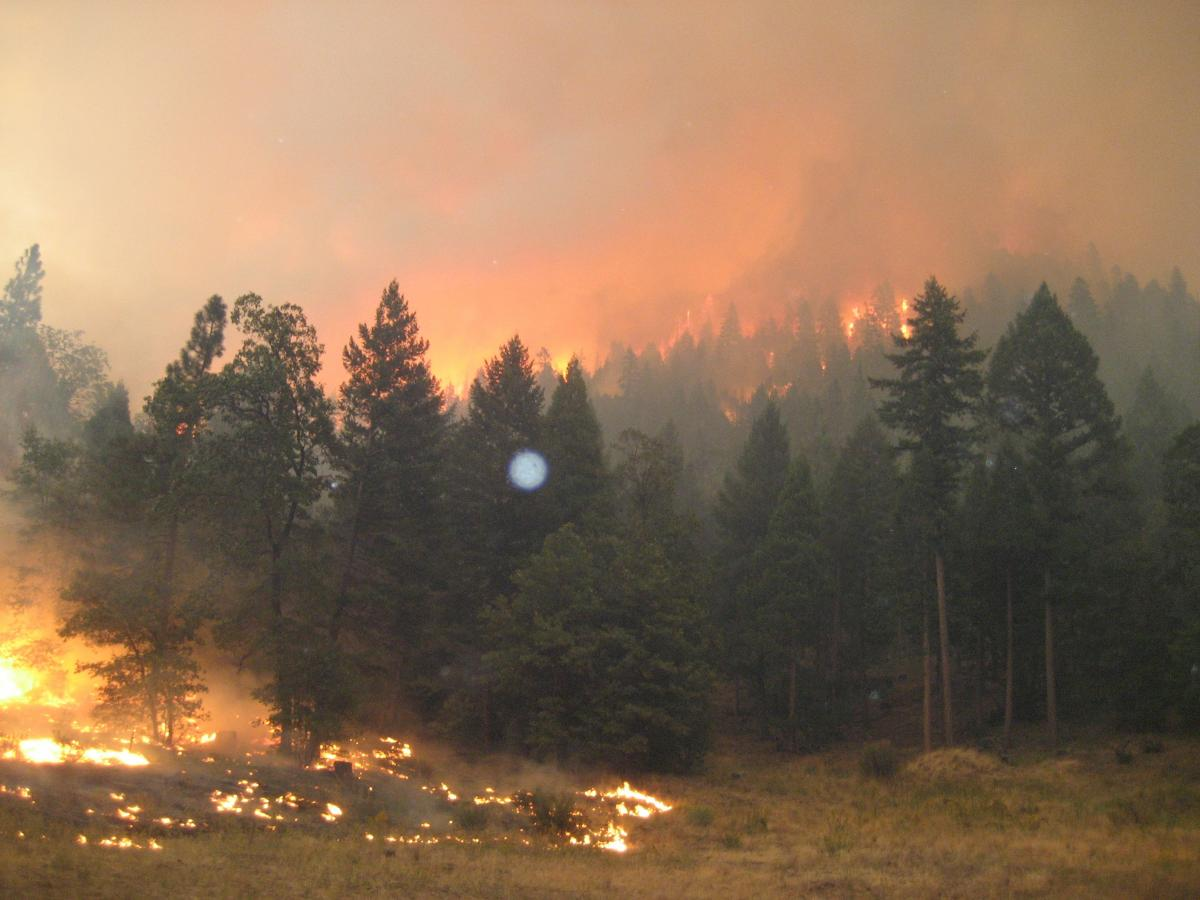
A Forest Service photo of the Moonlight Fire shows flame spread from the ground to a crown fire.

== Legal proceedings ==
The cause of the fire was never clearly established. Federal and state officials accused Sierra Pacific Industries of negligence in the hiring and supervision of a logging contractor.

In 2009, the Department of Justice sued Sierra Pacific, the logging contractor, and smaller parties, seeking almost $800 million in damages. Spooked by the precarious state of the lumber market at the time and the size of the sought-for damages, in 2012 Sierra Pacific and the other defendants entered into a voluntary settlement of $122.5 million. Sierra Pacific's contribution to the settlement consisted of $47 million and 22,500 acres of land, while the other defendants paid a total of $8 million. Sierra Pacific admitted no wrongdoing through the settlement, and though it was voluntary, CFO Mark Emmerson told Forbes in a 2018 interview that they "had a gun to our head."

=== District Court denial of motion to terminate settlement ===
On October 9, 2014, Sierra Pacific and other defendants filed a motion in Federal Court to terminate the settlement on the grounds that the investigation and prosecution were flawed and corrupt. As a result, on October 14, 2014, Chief Judge of the Eastern District of California Morrison C. England issued an order which referred the case to Alex Kozinski, then-Chief Judge of the Ninth Circuit Court of Appeals for the assignment of a judge outside of the Eastern District of California to assure impartiality. Judge Kozinski declined to appoint a judge outside of the Eastern District to hear the case, which was then reassigned to Senior District Judge William B. Shubb, who issued an order denying the motion on April 17, 2015.

The court ruled: "Defendants have failed to identity even a single instance of fraud on the court, certainly none on the part of any attorney for the government. They repeatedly argue that fraud on the court can be found by considering the totality of the allegations. Here, the whole can be no greater than the sum of its parts. Stripped of all its bluster, defendants' motion is wholly devoid of any substance."

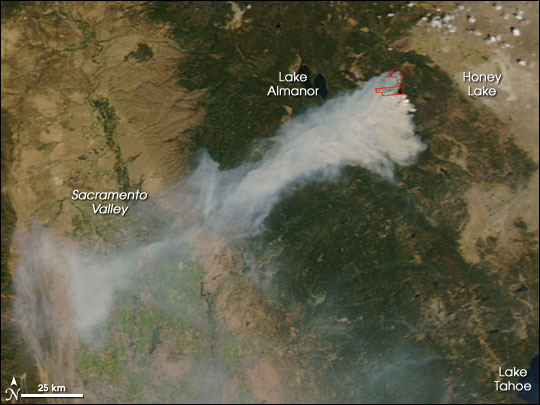
The Moonlight Fire's smoke plume streaming over Northern California, viewed by NASA's Aqua satellite on September 5, 2007.

=== Appeals Court ruling ===
The United States Court of Appeals for the Ninth Circuit affirmed on July 13, 2017. United States v. Sierra Pacific Industries, 862 F.3d 1157 (9th Cir. 2017). In a unanimous opinion, the court ruled that all of Sierra Pacific's accusations were legally insufficient, because it "voluntarily settled instead of going to trial" and "bound [itself] not to seek future relief." In addition, the court explained that the accusations of misconduct that Sierra Pacific claimed to have learned of after the settlement "do not constitute fraud on the court," and it was not a fraud for government counsel "to have their own theory of the case and discuss it with their witnesses."

=== Supreme Court denial of certiorari ===
On June 25, 2018, the U.S. Supreme Court denied certiorari. Therefore, all appeals have been exhausted and the case will not be heard by the Supreme Court.

=== Cal Fire sanctions ===
In 2014, Plumas County court judge Leslie Nichols ruled that Cal Fire had committed a "vast array" of "egregious and reprehensible" evidentiary violations during its investigation of the Moonlight Fire, rebuking an agency investigator for providing untruthful sworn testimony, destroying notes, and providing contradictory statements in his final report on the fire. Judge Nichols ordered Cal Fire to pay $30 million in sanctions. Cal Fire appealed the decision to the California Supreme Court, but the appeal was denied and the matter sent before a lower court. Finally, in October 2020, Cal Fire was ordered to pay $15 million in sanctions for the evidence disclosure violations during its probe, concluding the legal struggle between Cal Fire and Sierra Pacific Industries.

== See also ==
- Storrie Fire (2000)
- Walker Fire (2019)
- 2020 Lassen County wildfires
- Beckwourth Complex fires (2021)
- Dixie Fire (2021)
