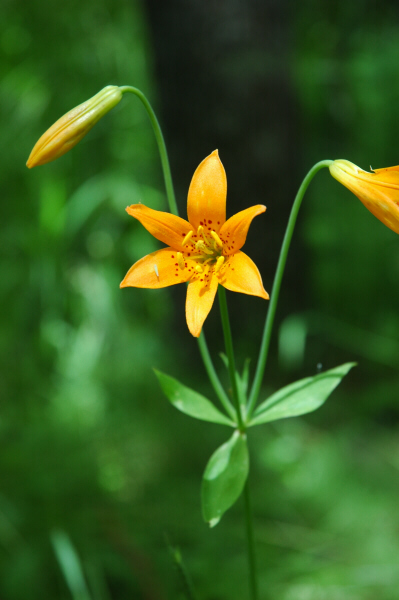

Scientific classification
- Kingdom: Plantae
- Clade: Tracheophytes
- Clade: Angiosperms
- Clade: Monocots
- Order: Liliales
- Family: Liliaceae
- Subfamily: Lilioideae
- Tribe: Lilieae
- Genus: Lilium
- Species: L. parvum

Binomial name
- Lilium parvum Kellogg

Synonyms
- Lilium canadense var. parvum (Kellogg) Baker ex Van Houtte

= Lilium parvum =

Species of lily

Lilium parvum is a species of lily known by the common names Sierra tiger lily and alpine lily. It is native to the mountains of the western United States, primarily the Sierra Nevada of California but also with additional populations in northwestern Nevada and southwestern Oregon. The plant grows in high altitude forests, sending up flowering stalks during the summer months.

== Description ==
The flowers of Lilium parvum are smaller than those of other lilies, and more bell-shaped than most others. They are yellowish-orange to dark orange-red with lighter orange or yellow centers. The petals are spotted with purple or brown markings. There is a variety that bears lighter pink flowers in the foothills of El Dorado County, California, which is known by the informal common name ditch lily. The plant also readily hybridizes with other Lilium species growing close by.

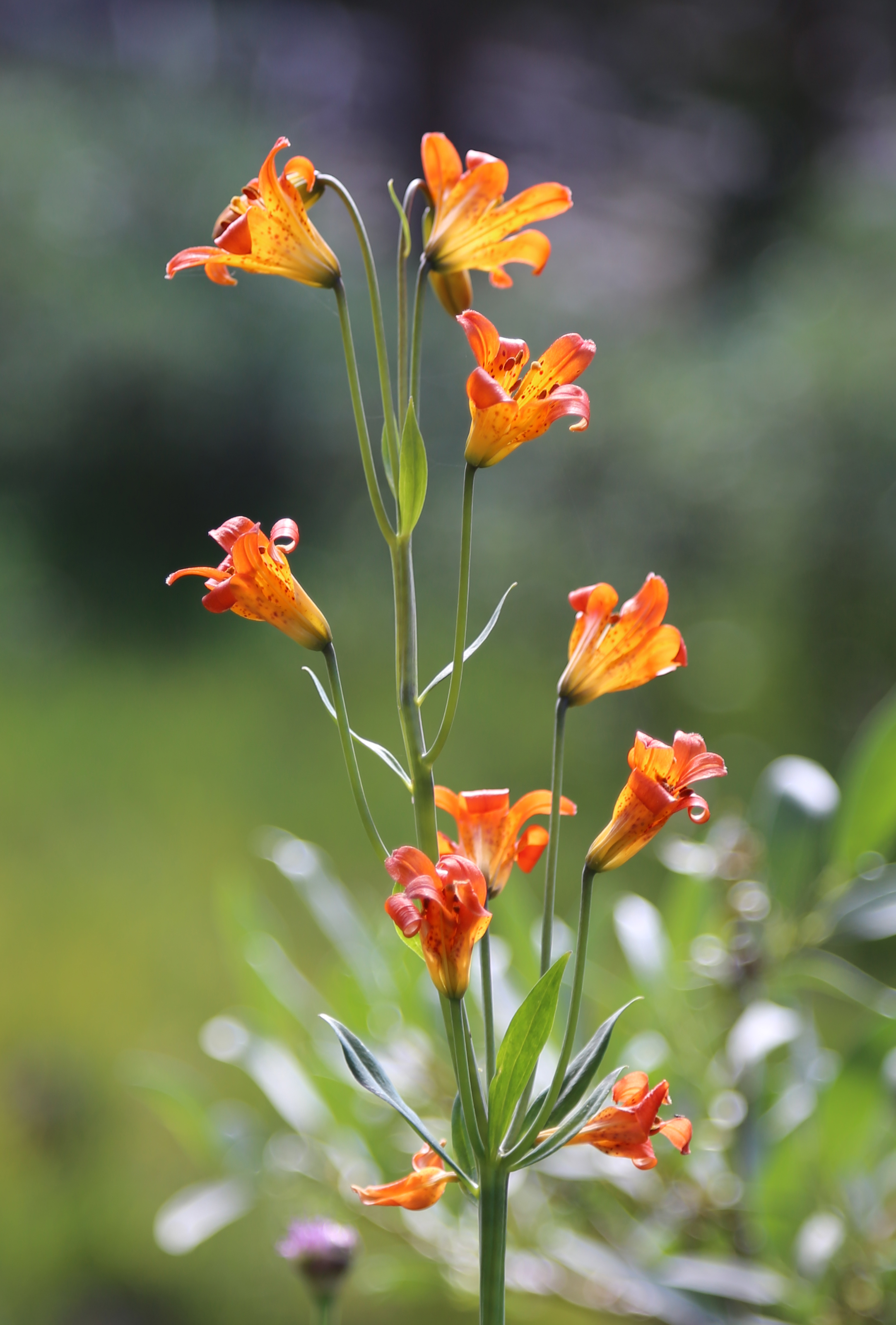
Lilium parvum inflorescence
