= Pine Town, California =

Unincorporated community in California, United States

Pine Town
- Unincorporated community
- Location in California Pine Town (the United States)
- Coordinates: 40°18′15″N 120°59′27″W
- Country: United States
- State: California
- County: Lassen
- Elevation: 5,089 ft (1,551 m)

Pine Town (formerly Old Town) is an unincorporated community in Lassen County, California, United States. It is 0.5 miles (0.8 km) east-southeast of Westwood, at an elevation of 5,089 feet (1,551 m).

Pine Town was the original Westwood townsite, located east of the mill pond. It had its own grocery store and a bridge across the mill pond. Today it is a residential area.
