= Adams Peak (California) =

Mountain in California, United States

- Location within California

Highest point
- Elevation: 8,199 ft (2,499 m)
- Prominence: 2,199 ft (670 m)
- Listing: Sierra Peaks Section Peaks List
- Coordinates: 39°54′39″N 120°6′1″W

Geography
- Country: United States
- State: California
- Counties: Plumas and Lassen
- Parent range: Sierra Nevada
- Topo map: Constantia

Adams Peak is the highest mountain peak in the Diamond Mountains of the Sierra Nevada, located on the border of Plumas and Lassen Counties, California.

The granitic summit is 8,199 ft (2,499 m) in elevation. The mountain burned during the 2021 Beckwourth Complex fires.
