= Diamond Mountain National Forest =

Former name of a tract of National Forest in California

Diamond Mountain National Forest was established as the Diamond Mountain Forest Reserve by the U.S. Forest Service in California on July 14, 1905 with 626,724 acres (2,536.26 km^{2}). It became a National Forest on March 4, 1907. On July 1, 1908 a portion of Diamond Mountain was transferred to Plumas National Forest and the remainder to Lassen National Forest. The name was discontinued.
