= Butterfly Valley Botanical Area =

Nature preserve

Coordinates: 40.0059°N 120.9943°W

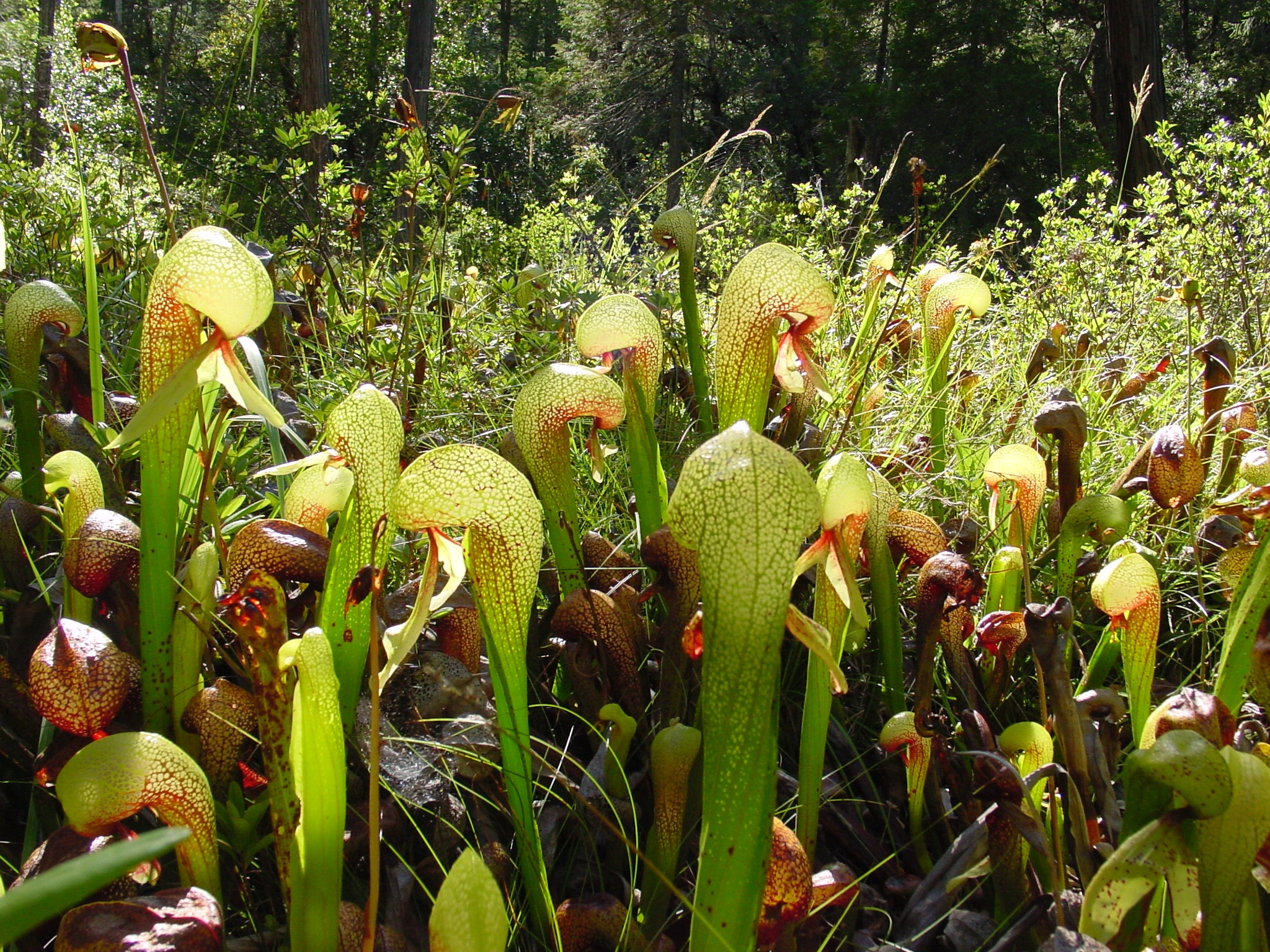
Butterfly Valley Botanical Area, with carnivorous plant habitat.

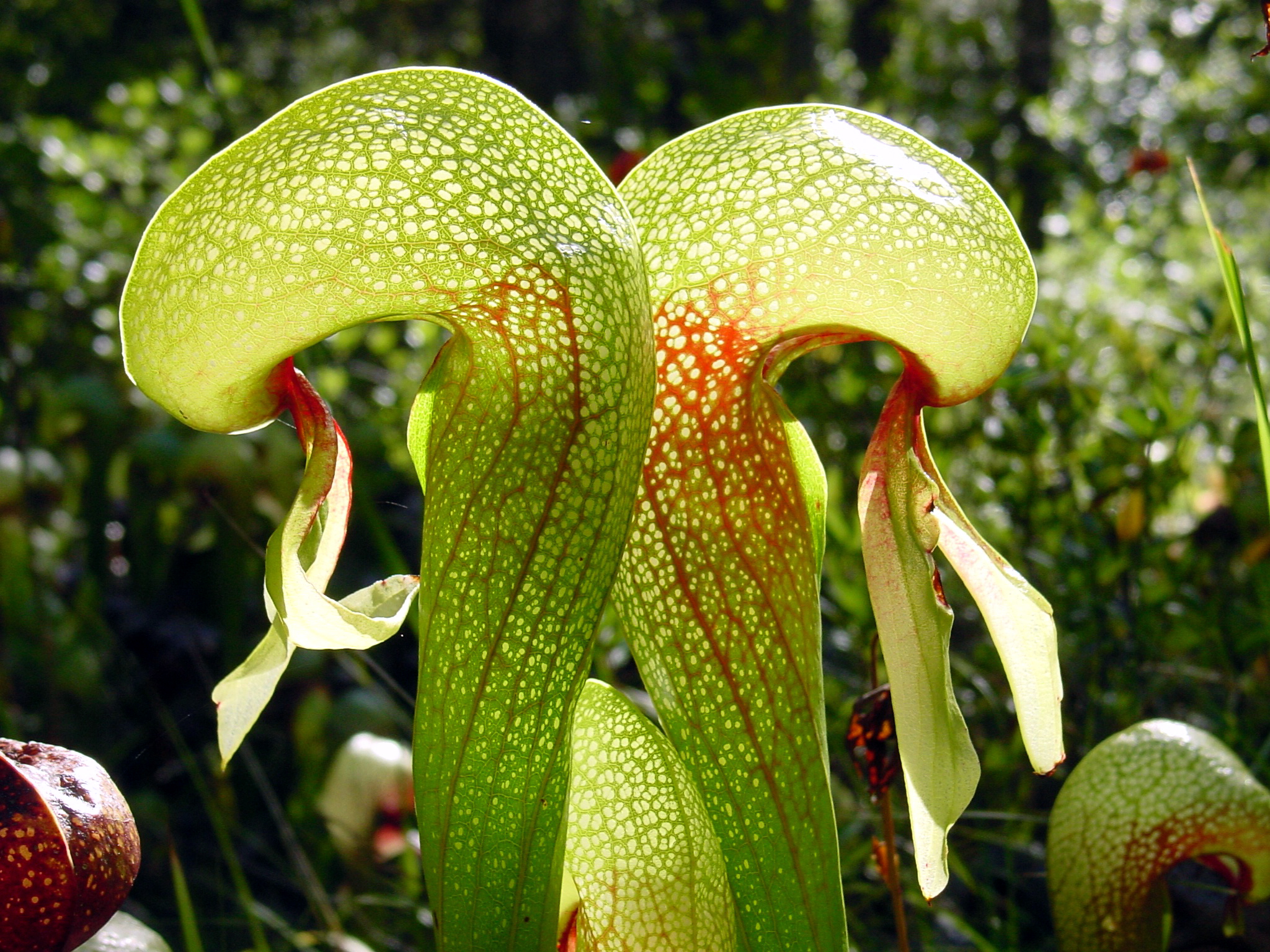
The carnivorous California Pitcher Plant - (Darlingtonia californica) in closeup.

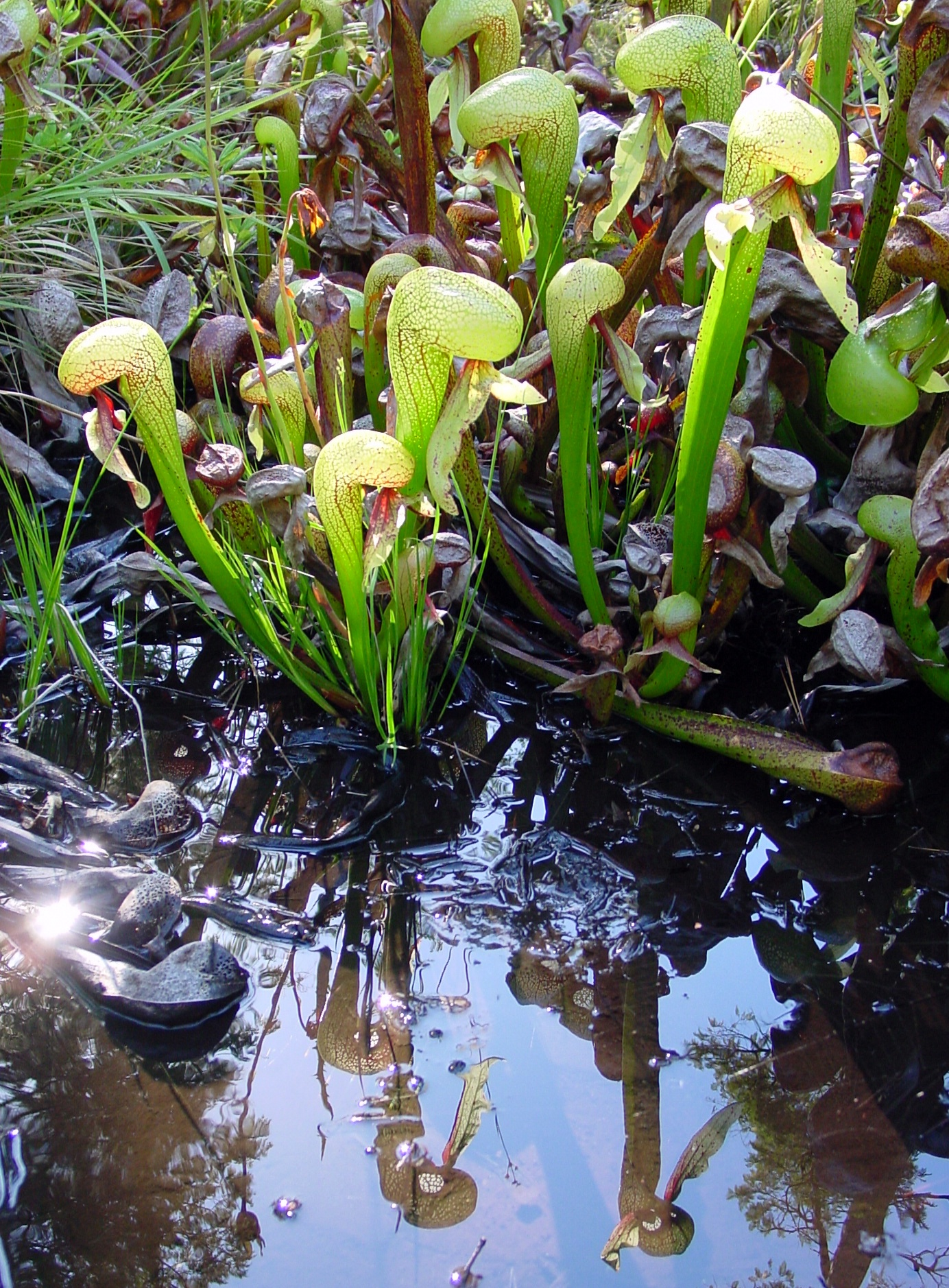
A bog habitat in the Butterfly Valley Botanical Area.

Butterfly Valley Botanical Area, in the northern Sierra Nevada, was designated a protected botanical area in 1976 due to its abundant, diverse plant life. It is located just north of Quincy, in Plumas County of northeastern California, United States. The unique plant community habitats of the nature reserve, thriving at elevations of 3,590–3,800 feet (1,090–1,160 m), are protected and managed by the Mt. Hough Ranger District of the Plumas National Forest.

== Plants ==
The rare native carnivorous plant, Darlingtonia californica ,makes a home here at the southern extreme of its range, a range that stretches in scattered bog habitats northwest across northern california then north along western Oregon.

Butterfly Valley's singular plant community also includes other carnivorous plants, two dozen species of native lilies and tiger lilies that include Lilium washingtonianum and Lilium parvum, a dozen Piperia species of native orchids, many species of native California ferns, as well as other California native plants.

== History ==
Mining

In the early 1850s, mining operations and the old mining town of Butterfly Valley occupied the area. When the mines were exhausted the town of Butterfly Valley was abandoned.

Grazing

After the mining interests left, grazing and logging operations became predominant in the valley. The Galeppi brothers increased this by bringing in their cattle into the area in the early 1900s. At about the same time as grazing began the Murphy Lumber Company began railroad logging, which the Quincy Lumber Company expanded after it purchased the Murphy Lumber Company. Logging operations stopped in 1950, leaving grazing as the primary commercial use of the valley it was designated a protected botanical area in 1976.

== See also ==
- List of plants of the Sierra Nevada (U.S.)
