= Spanish Creek (Georgia) =

- Location within Georgia Location within the United States

Physical characteristics
- Source
  - coordinates: 30.9560624°N 82.0856747°W
- Mouth
  - coordinates: 30.7918997°N 82.0165042°W

Spanish Creek is a stream in the U.S. state of Georgia. It is a tributary to the St. Marys River.

Spanish Creek was named after "Spanish John", a local Seminole Indian.
