= Thompson Peak (Plumas County, California) =

Mountain in California

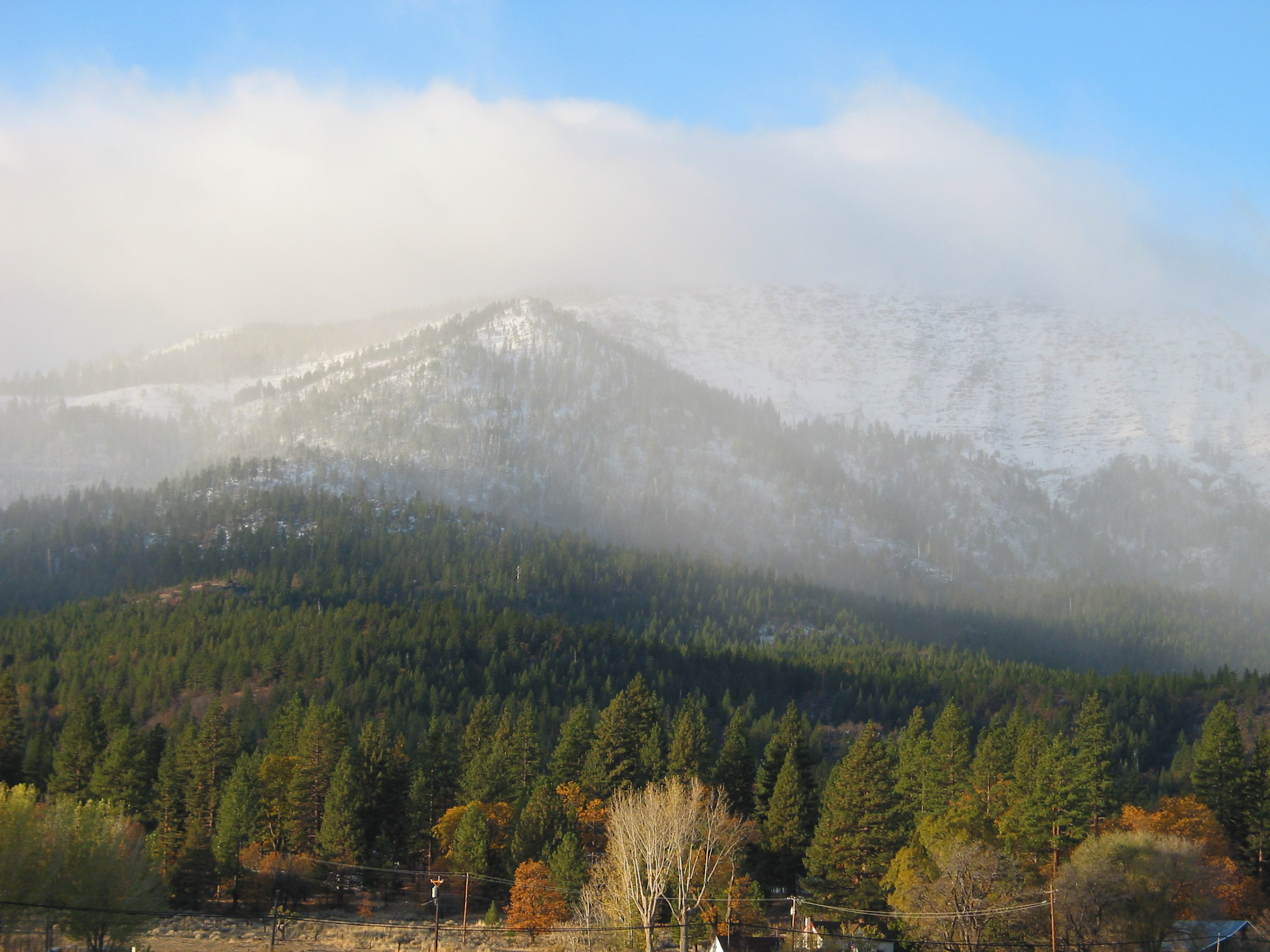

Highest point
- Elevation: 7,809 ft (2,380 m)
- Prominence: 1,795 ft (547 m)
- Coordinates: 40°15′39.26″N 120°33′27.52″W

Geography
- Location within California Location within the United States
- Location: Plumas County, Lassen County, California, United States
- Parent range: Diamond Mountains
- Topo map: USGS Janesville

Thompson Peak (Maidu : Widojkym Jamanim) is the second highest peak in the Diamond Mountains of the Sierra Nevada. Rising to 7,795 feet, it sits on the border of Lassen and Plumas Counties, California, in the United States.

It was named after Manly Thompson, who built one of the first cabins in the area in 1875 near the base of the mountain.

A two-story lookout was completed in 1932 and is still actively used by the Plumas National Forest.

A 37 acres site was used by the US Air Force as an Aircraft Control and Warning site from 1958 to 1970.

== Geology ==
The Thompson Peak ridgeline area is believed by geologists to be a source fissure of the largest eruptive unit in California, the Lovejoy Basalt. It is estimated that 150 km^{3} of lava was produced by the Lovejoy event, flowing from the Thompson Peak area as far as Table Mountain near Oroville, the Orland Buttes, and even Putnam Peak near Vacaville, 250 km to the southwest. ~12 km (7.5 mi) to the southeast of Thompson Peak at Stony Ridge, the Lovejoy Basalt reaches a maximum exposed thickness of ~245 m (800 ft).

Aeromagnetic mapping and field evidence suggest that the Lovejoy Basalt flowed south and then southwestward down existing canyons and channels, eventually meandering across the present-day Central Valley. The trace element composition of the Lovejoy Basalt is similar to that of the Columbia River Basalt Group farther north, and may suggest the presence of a mantle plume.

The summit ridge of Thompson Peak is capped with ~10.1 million year old (~10.1 Ma) Late Miocene porous basalt, meaning that the peak proper is not a volcano, but rather volcanic rock that likely flowed in from elsewhere. Beneath the Thompson Peak basalt is the Lovejoy Basalt of Middle Miocene (~15.4 Ma) age, and there is evidence that the Thompson Peak area itself was the source of the Lovejoy lava. The basalts of Thompson Peak lie atop the much older Cretaceous (~145-166 Ma) granodiorite of the Sierra Nevada Batholith.

Unit Name	Age	Description & Composition
Pliocene Volcanics	~5.3–2.6 Ma (Pliocene)	Regional volcanic rocks (often andesite or basaltic andesite) that overly older units in the Diamond Mountains and appear sporadically in the Thompson Peak area.
Basalt of Thompson Peak (Upper)	~10.1 Ma (Late Miocene)	Light gray, porous (diktytaxitic) basalt containing olivine and augite. It caps the summit of the peak.
Lovejoy Basalt	~15.4 Ma (Middle Miocene)	Dense, black, fine-grained (aphyric) basalt. Just southeast of the main peak along the lower ridgeline is believed to be at least one of the source fissures of the Lovejoy basalt.
Cretaceous Granodiorite	~145–66 Ma (Cretaceous)	Part of the Sierra Nevada Batholith, it forms the mountain's foundation.
