= Walker Fire (2019) =

2019 wildfire in Northern California

- Part of the 2019 California wildfires
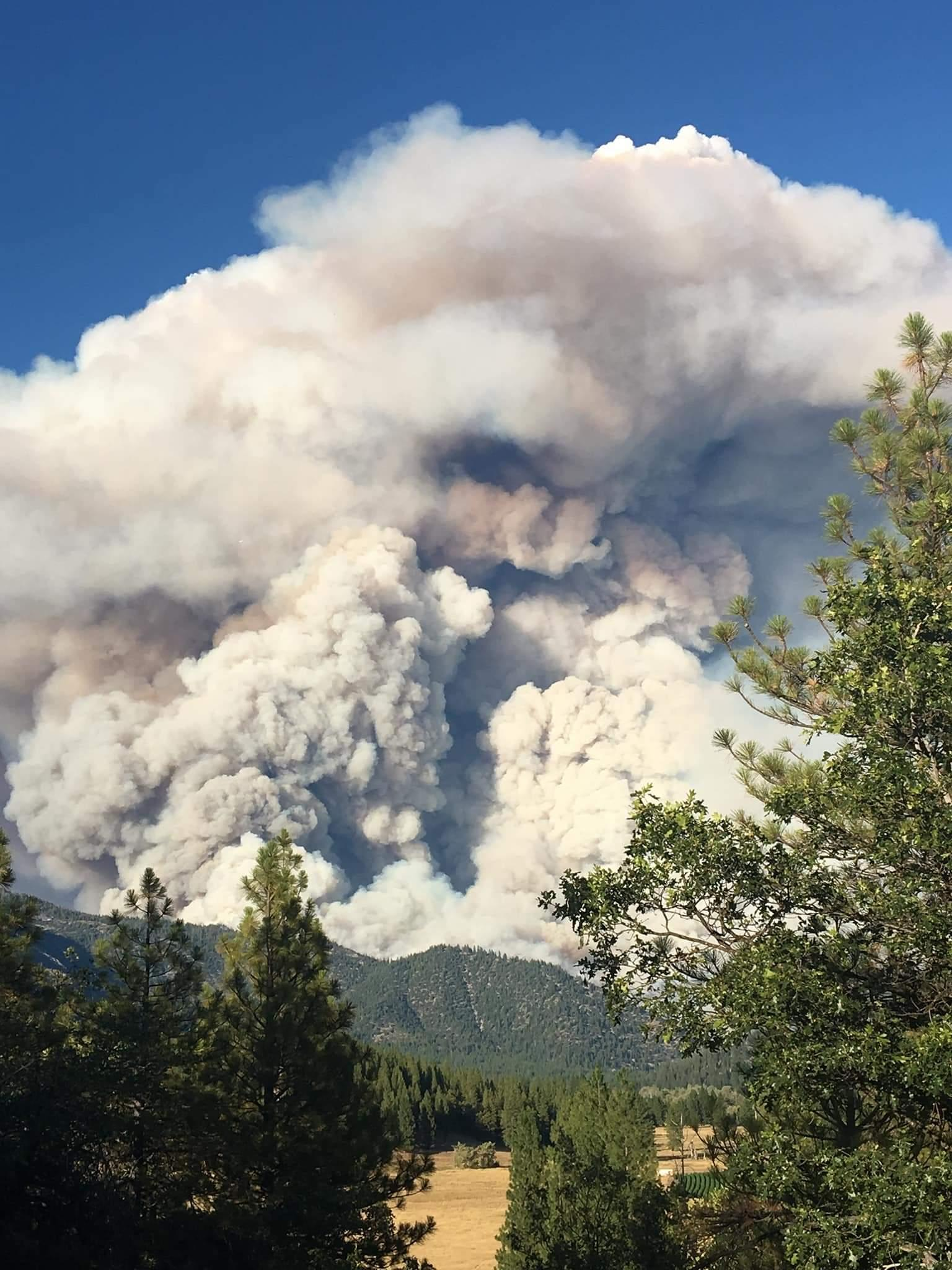
- Walker Fire on September 7, 2019
- Date: September 4, 2019 –; September 25, 2019
- Location: Genesee Valley, Plumas County, California
- Coordinates: 40.053°N 120.669°W

Statistics
- Burned area: 54,612 acres (22,101 ha)

Impacts
- Cost: $35.6 million; (equivalent to about $43 million in 2024)

Ignition
- Cause: Under investigation

Map
- Location in Northern California

Location of Walker Fire

The Walker Fire was a wildfire that burned near Genesee Valley in the Plumas National Forest approximately 11 miles east of the community of Taylorsville in Plumas County, California. The blaze was reported on Wednesday, September 4, 2019 and immediately expanded in size over its several days of burning. The fire actively threatened homes from Genesee Valley to Antelope Road.

== Progression ==
Early in the afternoon of Wednesday, September 4, a fire was reported burning southeast of the Flournoy Bridge just outside Genesee Valley. First responders estimated the size of the fire to be roughly between 3 and 5 acres, however, burning with a critical rate of spread due to strong and erratic winds. By late evening of that day, the fire was over 750 acres in size as the community of Genesee Valley was placed under a mandatory evacuation order. On Thursday, September 5, firefighters were reportedly making good progress as the fire was at 5% containment with 850 acres burned. However, later in the day, downdraft winds from late afternoon thunderstorms caused spotting ahead of the fireline which expanded the burn area to encompass up to 1,800 acres (7 km^{2}).

By Friday, September 6, fire activity had picked up significantly as further erratic, unpredictable winds and dry conditions lead the advancing fireline further into the Plumas National Forest towards the northeast spurring new voluntary evacuations of structures below Forest Road 26N11. The fire, originally burning 2,000 acres (8 km^{2}) Friday morning, had exploded to well over 17,000 acres (69 km^{2}) acres by Friday night due to the severe weather conditions, sending up a massive smoke column that was reportedly seen from as far as Reno. The fire was then over 24,000 acres (97 km^{2}) acres in size by Saturday morning as containment remained at 0%.

On September 10, the Walker Fire had grown to 47,340 acres (192 km^{2}) and was 12 percent contained. The Lassen County Fairground evacuation center was closed that morning. The majority of residential evacuation orders were lifted, except the Murdock Crossing and Stoney areas. The next evening, the fire continued to grow, but was 28 percent contained. Crews extended dozer lines and handlines to expand the containment. Structural defense was put in place for buildings at Murdock Crossing and mop up continued at Antelope Lake, Round Mountain and the eastern side of the fire. However, by the morning of September 14, the fire had expanded to 54,612 acres (22,101 ha) and was 97 percent contained.

The total cost of the firefighting effort was estimated by the National Interagency Fire Center at $35.6 million.

== Effects ==
=== Evacuations and closures ===
Select areas of Plumas National Forest were closed, specifically within the Mt. Hough and Beckwourth Ranger Districts. Road closures included : Janesville Grade, Genesee Valley Road at the Flournoy Bridge, Antelope Lake Road from the Flournoy Bridge to Antelope Dam, and beginning at the Flournoy Bridge turnoff, and 111 Beckwourth-Genesee road through the fire area. Highway 395 remained open to the public.

Communities along Highway 395 from Thunder Mountain Road (Wales Canyon) to the Laufman Grade (Old Highway 59), including the communities of Murdock Crossing, Stoney, Milford and Brockman Canyon, were under mandatory evacuation.
