= Diamond Mountains (California) =

Mountain range in California, United States

- Location within California

Highest point
- Peak: Adams Peak
- Elevation: 8,199 ft (2,499 m)

Geography
- Country: United States
- State: California
- Region: northern Sierra Crest
- County: Plumas County
- Range coordinates: 40°15′40.630″N 120°33′26.804″W
- Parent range: Sierra Nevada (U.S.)
- Borders on: SW of Honey Lake Valley
- Topo map: USGS Janesville

Geology
- Rock type: Granitic

Climbing
- Access: Diamond Mountain Trail

The Diamond Mountains is a mountain range in Lassen and Plumas counties, California, one of the northeasternmost portions of the Sierra Nevada.

== Notable features ==
- Diamond Mountain
- Thompson Peak and Lookout
- Black Mountain and Lookout
- Meadow View Peak
- Crystal Peak
- Adams Peak
- Beckwourth Pass
- Headwaters of Indian and Last Chance Creeks

== See also ==
- Diamond Mountain National Forest
