= Paxton, California =

Paxton
- Unincorporated Community; Census Designated Place
- Location in Plumas County and the state of California

- Location in the United States
- Coordinates: 40°2′12″N 120°59′45″W
- Country: United States
- State: California
- County: Plumas

Area
  - Total: 0.334 sq mi (0.864 km^{2})
  - Land: 0.334 sq mi (0.864 km^{2})
  - Water: 0 sq mi (0 km^{2}) 0%
- Elevation: 2,969 ft (905 m)

Population (2020)
  - Total: 0
  - Density: 0.0/sq mi (0.0/km^{2})
- Time zone: UTC-8 (Pacific (PST))
  - Summer (DST): UTC-7 (PDT)
- ZIP code: 95971
- Area code: 530
- FIPS code: 06-56182
- GNIS feature ID: 1656210

Paxton is a census-designated place (CDP) in Plumas County, California, United States. According to the 2020 census, it was unpopulated, down from 14 residents in the 2010 census.

== History ==
Paxton was once called Soda Bar. A post office called Paxton was established in 1917, and remained in operation until 1952.

== Geography ==
Paxton is located at 40°2′12″N 120°59′45″W (40.036559, -120.995701).

According to the United States Census Bureau, the CDP has a total area of 0.3 square miles (0.78 km^{2}), all land.

== Demographics ==
Historical population
Census	Pop.	Note	%±
2000	21		—
2010	14		−33.3%
2020	0		−100.0%
U.S. Decennial Census; 1860–1870 1880-1890; 1900 1910 1920; 1930 1940 1950; 1960 1970 1980; 1990 2000 2010

Paxton first appeared as a census designated place in the 2000 U.S. census.

=== 2020 ===
Paxton CDP, California – Racial and ethnic composition Note: the US Census treats Hispanic/Latino as an ethnic category. This table excludes Latinos from the racial categories and assigns them to a separate category. Hispanics/Latinos may be of any race.
Race / Ethnicity (NH = Non-Hispanic)	Pop 2000	Pop 2010	Pop 2020	% 2000	% 2010	% 2020
White alone (NH)	18	10	0	85.71%	71.43%	0.00%
Black or African American alone (NH)	0	0	0	0.00%	0.00%	0.00%
Native American or Alaska Native alone (NH)	1	0	0	4.76%	0.00%	0.00%
Asian alone (NH)	0	0	0	0.00%	0.00%	0.00%
Native Hawaiian or Pacific Islander alone (NH)	0	0	0	0.00%	0.00%	0.00%
Other race alone (NH)	0	0	0	0.00%	0.00%	0.00%
Mixed race or Multiracial (NH)	0	0	0	0.00%	0.00%	0.00%
Hispanic or Latino (any race)	2	4	0	9.52%	28.57%	0.00%
Total	21	14	0	100.00%	100.00%	100.00%

=== 2010 ===
At the 2010 census Paxton had a population of 14. The population density was 42.0 inhabitants per square mile (16.2/km^{2}). The racial makeup of Paxton was 14 (100.0%) White, 0 (0.0%) African American, 0 (0.0%) Native American, 0 (0.0%) Asian, 0 (0.0%) Pacific Islander, 0 (0.0%) from other races, and 0 (0.0%) from two or more races. Hispanic or Latino of any race were 4 people (28.6%).

The whole population lived in households, no one lived in non-institutionalized group quarters and no one was institutionalized.

There were 8 households, 1 (12.5%) had children under the age of 18 living in them, 2 (25.0%) were opposite-sex married couples living together, 0 (0%) had a female householder with no husband present, 0 (0%) had a male householder with no wife present. There were 0 (0%) unmarried opposite-sex partnerships, and 0 (0%) same-sex married couples or partnerships. 6 households (75.0%) were one person and 1 (12.5%) had someone living alone who was 65 or older. The average household size was 1.75. There were 2 families (25.0% of households); the average family size was 3.50.

The age distribution was 3 people (21.4%) under the age of 18, 1 people (7.1%) aged 18 to 24, 3 people (21.4%) aged 25 to 44, 6 people (42.9%) aged 45 to 64, and 1 people (7.1%) who were 65 or older. The median age was 44.5 years. For every 100 females, there were 250.0 males. For every 100 females age 18 and over, there were 266.7 males.

There were 14 housing units at an average density of 42.0 per square mile, of the occupied units 1 (12.5%) were owner-occupied and 7 (87.5%) were rented. The homeowner vacancy rate was 0%; the rental vacancy rate was 30.0%. 6 people (42.9% of the population) lived in owner-occupied housing units and 8 people (57.1%) lived in rental housing units.

=== 2000 ===
At the 2000 census there were 21 people, 9 households, and 5 families in the CDP. The population density was 60.1 inhabitants per square mile (23.2/km^{2}). There were 13 housing units at an average density of 37.2 per square mile (14.4/km^{2}). The racial makeup of the CDP was 95.24% White and 4.76% Native American. Hispanic or Latino of any race were 9.52%.

Of the 9 households 44.4% had children under the age of 18 living with them, 44.4% were married couples living together, 11.1% had a female householder with no husband present, and 44.4% were non-families. 44.4% of households were one person and none had someone living alone who was 65 or older. The average household size was 2.33 and the average family size was 3.40.

The age distribution was 38.1% under the age of 18, 38.1% from 25 to 44, 23.8% from 45 to 64, . The median age was 28 years. For every 100 females, there were 110.0 males. For every 100 females age 18 and over, there were 160.0 males.

The median household income was $56,250 and the median family income was $56,250. Males had a median income of $43,750 versus $0 for females. The per capita income for the CDP was $11,621. None of the population and none of the families were below the poverty line.

== Politics ==
In the state legislature, Paxton is in the 1st senatorial district, represented by Republican Megan Dahle, and the 1st Assembly district, represented by Republican Heather Hadwick.

Federally, Paxton is in California's 3rd congressional district, represented by Independent Kevin Kiley.

== Education ==
The school district is Plumas Unified School District.
