= Taylorsville, California =

Taylorsville
- Unincorporated Community; Census Designated Place
- Location in Plumas County and the state of California

- Location in the United States
- Coordinates: 40°4′25″N 120°50′17″W
- Country: United States
- State: California
- County: Plumas

Area
  - Total: 3.247 sq mi (8.410 km^{2})
  - Land: 3.247 sq mi (8.410 km^{2})
  - Water: 0 sq mi (0 km^{2}) 0%
- Elevation: 3,547 ft (1,081 m)

Population (2020)
  - Total: 123
  - Density: 37.9/sq mi (14.6/km^{2})
- Time zone: UTC-8 (Pacific (PST))
  - Summer (DST): UTC-7 (PDT)
- ZIP code: 95983
- Area code: 530
- FIPS code: 06-78008
- GNIS feature ID: 1659961

Taylorsville is a census-designated place (CDP) in Plumas County, California, United States. The population was 123 at the 2020 census, down from 150 at the 2010 census. The annual Stone Ranch Reunion is held in Taylorsville.

== Geography ==
Taylorsville is located at 40°4′25″N 120°50′17″W (40.073685, -120.838180).

According to the United States Census Bureau, the CDP has a total area of 3.2 square miles (8.3 km^{2}), all land.

== Demographics ==
Historical population
Census	Pop.	Note	%±
2000	154		—
2010	140		−9.1%
2020	123		−12.1%
U.S. Decennial Census; 1860–1870 1880-1890; 1900 1910 1920; 1930 1940 1950; 1960 1970 1980; 1990 2000 2010

Taylorsville first appeared as a census designated place in the 2000 U.S. census.

=== 2020 ===
Taylorsville CDP, California – Racial and ethnic composition Note: the US Census treats Hispanic/Latino as an ethnic category. This table excludes Latinos from the racial categories and assigns them to a separate category. Hispanics/Latinos may be of any race.
Race / Ethnicity (NH = Non-Hispanic)	Pop 2000	Pop 2010	Pop 2020	% 2000	% 2010	% 2020
White alone (NH)	140	130	97	90.91%	92.86%	78.86%
Black or African American alone (NH)	0	0	0	0.00%	0.00%	0.00%
Native American or Alaska Native alone (NH)	1	3	9	0.65%	2.14%	7.32%
Asian alone (NH)	1	0	0	0.65%	0.00%	0.00%
Native Hawaiian or Pacific Islander alone (NH)	0	0	0	0.00%	0.00%	0.00%
Other race alone (NH)	0	0	0	0.00%	0.00%	0.00%
Mixed race or Multiracial (NH)	9	6	8	5.84%	4.29%	6.50%
Hispanic or Latino (any race)	3	1	9	1.95%	0.71%	7.32%
Total	154	140	123	100.00%	100.00%	100.00%

The 2020 United States census reported that Taylorsville had a population of 123. The population density was 37.9 inhabitants per square mile (14.6/km^{2}). The racial makeup of Taylorsville was 103 (83.7%) White, 11 (8.9%) Native American, and 9 (7.3%) from two or more races. Hispanic or Latino of any race were 9 persons (7.3%).

The whole population lived in households. There were 62 households, out of which 9 (14.5%) had children under the age of 18 living in them, 29 (46.8%) were married-couple households, 3 (4.8%) were cohabiting couple households, 25 (40.3%) had a female householder with no partner present, and 5 (8.1%) had a male householder with no partner present. 29 households (46.8%) were one person, and 19 (30.6%) were one person aged 65 or older. The average household size was 1.98. There were 30 families (48.4% of all households).

The age distribution was 20 people (16.3%) under the age of 18, 8 people (6.5%) aged 18 to 24, 21 people (17.1%) aged 25 to 44, 41 people (33.3%) aged 45 to 64, and 33 people (26.8%) who were 65 years of age or older. The median age was 56.8 years. There were 60 males and 63 females.

There were 74 housing units at an average density of 22.8 units per square mile (8.8 units/km^{2}), of which 62 (83.8%) were occupied. Of these, 50 (80.6%) were owner-occupied, and 12 (19.4%) were occupied by renters.

== Politics ==
In the state legislature, Taylorsville is in the 1st senatorial district, represented by Republican Megan Dahle, and the 1st Assembly district, represented by Republican Heather Hadwick.

Federally, Taylorsville is in California's 3rd congressional district, represented by Independent Kevin Kiley.

== Education ==
The school district is Plumas Unified School District.
