= Plumas National Forest =

National Forest in northern California, United States

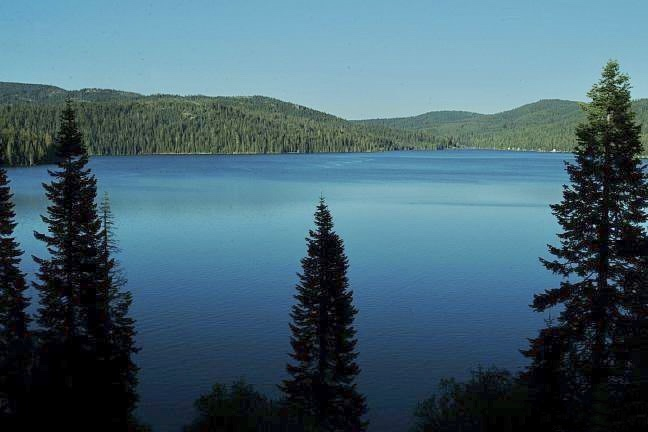
- Bucks Lake in Plumas National Forest
- Interactive map of Plumas National Forest
- Nearest city: Quincy, California
- Coordinates: 40°00′01″N 120°40′05″W
- Area: 1,146,000 acres (4,640 km^{2})
- Established: 1907
- Governing body: U.S. Forest Service
- Website: Plumas National Forest

Plumas National Forest is a 1,146,000-acre (464,000 ha) United States national forest located in northern California at the northern terminus of the Sierra Nevada mountain range. The Forest was named after its primary watershed, the Rio de las Plumas, or Feather River. Part of the natural area is old-growth forest and recognized by the Old-Growth Forest Network.

== Geography ==
About 85% of Plumas National Forest lies in Plumas County, portions extend into eastern Butte, northern Sierra, southern Lassen, and northeastern Yuba counties.

== Management ==
The land is managed by the United States Forest Service under the Department of Agriculture with local management stationed at the Plumas National Forest Supervisor's office in Quincy, California. The forest is also subdivided into three Ranger Districts, the Beckwourth Ranger District, the Feather River Ranger District and the Mt. Hough Ranger District, with local management in Blairsden, Oroville, and Quincy, respectively.

== History ==
Plumas was established as the Plumas Forest Reserve by the United States General Land Office on March 27, 1905. In 1906 the forest was transferred to the United States Forest Service, and on March 4, 1907, it became a National Forest. On July 1, 1908, a portion of Diamond Mountain National Forest was added. The Bucks Lake Wilderness was officially designated in 1984 as a part of the National Wilderness Preservation System.

== Ecology ==
A 2002 study by the Forest Service identified 127,000 acres (51,000 ha) of the forest as old-growth, using an economic type definition. The most common old-growth forest types are mixed conifer forests of:

- Coast Douglas-fir (Pseudotsuga menziesii var. menziesii)
- Pacific and Columbia Ponderosa pine (Pinus ponderosa ssp. critchfieldiana) in the west, transitioning to (P. ponderosa ssp. ponderosa) in the far eastern section
- Sierra White fir (Abies concolor ssp. lowiana)
- Jeffrey pine (Pinus jeffreyi)
- Red fir (Abies magnifica)
- Sierra Lodgepole pine (Pinus contorta ssp. murrayana)
- Incense cedar (Calocedrus decurrens)
- Sugar pine (Pinus lambertiana)

Virtually no virgin timberland exists, as the area has been a logging epicenter starting with the gold rush continuing into the modern era.

== See also ==
- List of national forests of the United States
- List of plants of the Sierra Nevada (U.S.)
- Modoc Cypress
- Category:Fauna of the Sierra Nevada (United States)
- Butterfly Valley Botanical Area
- Feather Falls
- Lake Davis
- Frenchman Lake (California)
- Bucks Lake
- Mount Ingalls (California)
- Thompson Peak (Plumas County, California)
- Adams Peak
- Diamond Mountains (California)
- Moonlight Fire (2007)
- Camp Fire (2018)
- Walker Fire (2019)
- North Complex Fire (2020)
- Dixie Fire (2021)
- Lost Sierra
- Yuba County Five — disappearance of Gary Mathias in 1978
