= Lost Sierra =

Region of the Sierra Nevada, California

The Lost Sierra is a northern Sierra Nevada region in California in the United States, named after the heavy winter snowfall that isolates the area. It encompasses the area of Plumas County, Sierra County, and parts of Lassen County.

== Terminology ==
The origin of the term “Lost Sierra” was attributed to William Berry, an official historian of the United States Ski Association, who used the term to describe the region when he visited it for the first time circa 1933. The term appears independently in regional newspapers as early as 1978. Berry publicized the term more widely in his 1991 book Lost Sierra; Gold, Ghosts & Skis.

== Geography ==
The Lost Sierra is a region bordered on the north by the North Fork of the Feather River, to the south by the North Fork of the Yuba River, to the west by the town of La Porte, a prominent gold town of the late 1800s, and to the East by Eureka Peak — the mountain that appears on the Great Seal of the State of California. Those original borders include prominent communities of the gold rush era, many of which are now tourist destinations including Quincy, the seat of Plumas County, Johnsville, a small town known for its longboard ski events, and Downieville and Sierra City, two more Gold Rush boomtowns on the North Fork of the Yuba River. Current popular usage generally refers to a larger area that runs farther east towards the Nevada border, including the towns of Graeagle and Blairsden, Portola, Beckwourth, Chilcoot, and Vinton as well as regional destinations such as Lake Davis, and farther north through Indian Valley (once home to the largest population of the Mountain Maidu tribe), onto the towns of Greenville and Taylorsville and the area encompassing Lake Almanor.

== History ==
=== Maidu ===
The first known human residents of the region now known as the Lost Sierra were the Maidu. The Maidu people were divided into three tribes, including the Nisenan and Konkow Maidu, who dwelled in portions of the Sacramento Valley, and the Mountain Maidu, who lived to the east of the other two tribes, over the summit of the Sierra Nevada in what is now Plumas County and a large portion of the Lost Sierra.

The Maidu practiced a hunting-gathering lifestyle. Taking advantage of the abundant natural resources of the area, they employed sophisticated harvesting and hunting techniques to obtain food and materials from a variety of sources, including big and small game, fish, and regional flora including roots, seeds, tubers, and wild onions. Acorns were among the most important staples, and the annual gathering and processing of acorns was a significant cultural activity.

The Mountain Maidu numbered roughly 2,000 to 3,000 at their historical peak, with this number divided into smaller communities scattered throughout the region, clustered around the natural abundance of several large alpine valleys, including the areas now referred to as Indian Valley (which hosted the largest Maidu community), Big Meadows, and the Butt, Genessee, Meadow, Mohawk, and Sierra Valleys.

The arrival of European American settlers, prospectors and industries driven by the westward expansion of the United States was severely disruptive to the Mountain Maidu population and culture. Over the course of the early 20th century, the Maidu people were displaced from their historical homelands and saw the erosion of their culture, language, and traditions. More recently, through the concerted efforts of a number of organizations, including the Maidu Summit Consortium and the Feather River Land Trust, substantial portions of traditional Maidu lands have been returned to tribal management.

=== Western Immigration and the gold rush ===
Though the Spanish occupied Northern California for many years, they did not extensively explore or settle in the Sierra Nevada or the Lost Sierra region. The harsh winters and rugged terrain of the region made permanent occupation a difficult prospect for these early travelers.

Traffic through the area increased quickly when, on December 5, 1848, U.S. President James K. Polk announced in an address to Congress that gold had been found in California, igniting a rush of treasure-seeking migrants.

Initially, the vast majority of these emigres passed through the Lost Sierra en route to the Sacramento Valley and the Sierra Foothills via the Lassen Trail. That changed when a man named Thomas Robertson Stoddard appeared at a mining camp on the North Fork of the Feather River in the fall of 1849. Stoddard was injured and exhausted, having become separated from the party of explorers he had ventured westward with. Stoddard produced several large nuggets of gold he claimed to have found on the shores of a lake in the High Sierra during his time in the wilderness.

Whatever the truth of Stoddard's experience, the story spread across Northern California, and the following spring, what would become known as the "Gold Lake Excitement" ensued. In late May, Stoddard himself led a party of prospectors that struck out from Nevada City, California in search of the lake he had come across. After many days of wandering, it soon became apparent that Stoddard was incapable of finding the "Gold Lake", and the demoralized party at one point threatened to hang him should he not find the lake the next day. Stoddard snuck out of camp that night, and made his way back down to the foothills.

These initial immigrants to the Lost Sierra were followed by thousands more, and while the Gold Lake was never found again, prospectors found many rich gold deposits in the Lost Sierra, and large regional gold mining concerns persisted into the early 1900s. In addition, during the 1920s and 1930s, Plumas County, the heart of the Lost Sierra, was the number one producer of copper in the state of California, with two large commercial mining operations producing over $48 million over the course of their lifetimes. Thus mining became the first economic cornerstone of the Lost Sierra.

=== Lumber, railroads, and cattle ===
Gold mining was not the only industry to take advantage of the resources and environment of the Lost Sierra during the late nineteenth and twentieth centuries.

The verdant alpine valleys of the region featured abundant water, fertile soil, and gentle terrain, making them ideal for both ranching and farming. Commercial ranching began in the early 1850s, when several Mexican ranchers in Meadow Valley began charging miners rent to pasture their mules. As the population of the Lost Sierra increased due to the emergence of gold mining, commercial ranching and agriculture spread to other fertile sites, including the Sierra Valley, Indian Valley, Genesse Valley and American Valley. The Sierra Valley, on the eastern side of the Lost Sierra, became particularly important for cattle ranching after the Homestead Act of 1862 helped settlers acquire acreage. The Sierra Valley was said to have grass “higher than a man’s head” during the summer months, and eventually large ranching and hay farming concerns grew to be one of the most important economic engines in the region.

Dairy farming began to displace beef stock ranching in the later portion of the 19th century and into the early 20th, as milk, butter and cheese represented a higher return per animal. An influx of Italian-Swiss immigrants to the Sierra Valley in the period between 1870 and 1890s further boosted the dairy industry, and these close-knit family groups eventually settled into many of the existing communities in the eastern Lost Sierra, including Chilcoot, Vinton, Loyalton, and Beckwourth.

The timber and railroad industries co-evolved in the Lost Sierra. Lumber was required from the very beginning of the gold mining era, for construction of buildings, mining structures, and eventually tunnel buttresses. Some of the earliest roads in the area were created in order to move lumber from the pine stands to the mills. By 1860, there were 18 lumber mills operating in Plumas county alone, and more in other parts of the Lost Sierra, including Downieville and Sierraville in Sierra County.

During the last part of the 19th century, the timber industry in the Lost Sierra expanded beyond regional borders. This growth was driven by two factors: an increase in private land ownership, and improvements in logging and transportation methods. One of the first corporate enterprises to take advantage of these improvements was the Sierra Flume and Lumber Company, which in its brief heyday ran ten sawmills producing an estimated 400,00 feet of cut lumber daily for export to areas as far away as South America and Australia. The company's private telegraph network was said to be the largest in the state.

In the early 20th century, the lumber industry continued to grow with little to no regulation, and surpassed mining as the primary industry in the Lost Sierra. Railroads were built to enable more efficient transportation of cut timber to mills and eventually to market. The first line was the Sierra Valley Railroad, a track that ran from Plumas Junction, in Nevada, over the Beckwourth Pass, reaching as far as the now-defunct lumbering boomtown of Claireville in 1896. The SVR was soon followed by numerous other rail lines and spurs, spanning the width and breadth of the Lost Sierra. These railroads that sprouted up in conjunction with the burgeoning timber industry included the Boca & Loyalton, which initially ran a track from Boca, near Truckee, CA, to Loyalton, at the very southern edge of the Lost Sierra region. The railroad expanded deeper into the Lost Sierra in the early 1900s, and by 1908 had 56 miles of main and spur tracks, hauling lumber as well as ice from the Grizzly Creek Ice company, which cut nearly 20,000 tons of ice for the produce cars of the newly established Western Pacific Railroad.

While the number of railroads diminished as logging trucks came to the fore in the mid 20th century, the importance of railroads continued – and continues to this day – due to the presence of the nation's sixth transcontinental railroad.

In 1892, George Gould inherited the Denver & Rio Grande Railroad after the death of his father, the railroad magnate Jay Gould. George wished to extend his railroad to the Pacific, but found himself stymied by a number of factors, including being blocked by competitors occupying routes in Southern California and the Sierra Nevada. In 1903, Gould and his associates formed the Western Pacific Railway (WPRy) and commenced surveying operations to engineer a new route from Salt Lake City to San Francisco that would run through western Nevada, over the Beckwourth Pass, and straight through the heart of the Lost Sierra before winding down the foothills towards Sacramento and the Bay Area.

The construction of the Western Pacific Railway was a boon to the economy of the region, employing nearly 9000 individuals overall during the course of its development. Work camps were dispersed along the route to lay tracks in both directions, speeding up construction, and providing a source of revenue for local businesses. One settlement, the town of Summit, elected to move the entire community closer to one of the camps. Later on, with the construction of Highway 70, that community, now known as Chilcoot, once again relocated to its current site.

No community, however, benefited more from the WPRy than the town now known as Portola. Because it had a terminus of the still-operational Boca & Loyalton Railroad, heavy equipment, workers, and supplies could all be shipped from San Francisco via the Southern Pacific Railroad, transferred to the B & L and on to Portola. The town was first referred to as "Headquarters" by the WPRy, before the current name was adopted.

The WPRy eventually became the Western Pacific Railroad, and later was absorbed into the Union Pacific Railroad. The line still operates regular cargo service across the Lost Sierra, although Portola is no longer a main depot. The only other operational railroads in the Lost Sierra today are the UPRR, the Quincy Railroad Company, and the Collins Pine Almanor spur. Burlington Northern and Santa Fe Railroad runs from Keddie north.

Today, the dairy industry is all but gone in the Lost Sierra, though cattle ranching is still an important economic activity. The timber industry, beset by many years of unfettered logging and environmental regulation, has also diminished, though it does continue and is seeing something of a resurgence due to the need for fire abatement in Northern California.

=== Skiing ===
One of the most notable and unique facets of the history of the Lost Sierra is the development and growth of skiing as both a practical means of transportation and a popular pastime. The Lost Sierra, particularly the peaks between Johnsville and La Porte, was the birthplace of competitive skiing in the Western Hemisphere, and the sport was an integral part of daily life during the winter months from the gold mining era into the early 20th century.

While the “Gold Lake Excitement” lured thousands of prospectors, and the purveyors of services and goods who supported them, into the Lost Sierra as early as the summer of 1850, the region emptied during the winter months due to the heavy snow load and nearly impassable rugged terrain in the winter mountains.

This changed when, somewhere between 1851 and 1852, Charles Nelson, a Norwegian-born miner living in La Porte introduced Norwegian style skis to his compatriots. Called “snowshoes”, “Norwegian snowshoes”, or “longboards” at the time, the skis Nelson introduced to the Sierra were quite different from those seen on ski slopes today. These were heavy slabs of curved wood, typically 7 –12 feet in length, with non-standardized, open-heel bindings crafted from leather and rope. The skier utilized a single hand held pole that was dragged in the snow to help control direction and speed.

The skis revolutionized life during winters in the mining towns of the Lost Sierra.. They allowed the delivery of mail and goods, enabled socializing and community interaction, and soon evolved into a recreational and competitive pastime. By 1863, many of the regional communities boasted organized skiing competitions and rostered competitive teams.

According to Berry, by 1854, the first ski factory in the United States was operating in Saw Pit Flat, a mining town in the Lost Sierra, north of Lake Tahoe between the Yuba and Feather Rivers. According to Berry, it was in the Lost Sierra that America's first Ski clubs were formed, and where the world's very first organized downhill ski races were held.

== Description ==
Historically, the economic engines of the Lost Sierra were mining, lumber, ranching, and railroads. These industries have all declined since their respective heyday for various reasons including over-cutting, regulation, declining returns, and changes in national consumption patterns.

Those historic industries, however, along with the completion of the Western Pacific Railway (1910) and the Feather River Highway (1937) which is now a National Scenic Byway, created a transportation infrastructure that permitted easy access to the previously hard to reach peaks and valleys of the Lost Sierra, allowing for the growth of tourism and recreation as a major source of economic growth for regional communities. Today, the Lost Sierra has become a destination area for a variety of activities.

=== Outdoor recreation ===
Hiking, camping, backpacking, and mountain biking draw many visitors to the Lost Sierra every year. Numerous trail systems and campgrounds provide a wide range of options for outdoor enthusiasts.

The Lakes Basin has glacier-carved valleys and numerous small mountain lakes, and connects to the Pacific Crest Trail. Plumas Eureka State Park encompasses a section of the Lakes Basin.

The area around Quincy, the seat of Plumas County, features the Bucks Lake Wilderness with over 21,000 acres of protected forest, as well as trail access along the steep slopes of the Feather River Canyon.

Downieville, at the southern edge of the Lost Sierra, is a mountain biking destination featuring many miles of trails with large changes in elevation. The Sierra Buttes Trail Stewardship is a non-profit organization that develops and maintains hiking/biking/dirt bike trails throughout the Lost Sierra. The group's Connected Communities project, launched in the early 2020s, plans to create a Lost Sierra Route consisting of more than 600 miles of multi-use trails linking 15 regional communities, with the goal of increasing tourism.

=== Golfing ===
In 1958 Harvey West Sr, a timber operator from Placerville, Ca, purchased the entire town of Graeagle from the California Fruit Exchange, which had been producing fruit boxes there since 1918. West subdivided the town and created the first of many golf courses in the Lost Sierra, the Graeagle Meadows Golf Course.

Today, numerous regional courses bring golfers to all corners of the Lost Sierra. Along with Graeagle, courses can be found in or near Lake Almanor, Portola, Clio, and Indian Valley.

=== Angling ===
The Lost Sierra includes a number of well-regarded spots for both lake and stream fishing. Bucks Lake, near Quincy, is notable for producing both Kokanee Salmon and Mackinaw Trout as well as Rainbow Trout, while the Middle Fork of the Feather River, one of the first rivers in the nation to receive the National Wild and Scenic designation and the only un-dammed arm of the Feather River, is a recognized fly-fishing destination.

Lake Davis, near Portola, on the eastern side of the Lost Sierra, is known for containing some of the largest rainbow trout in Northern California, as well as bullhead and largemouth bass.

In the northern reaches of the Lost Sierra, Lake Almanor, the largest lake in the region, is stocked regularly, making it a popular fishing destination. Nearby Deer Creek is one of the only undammed tributaries of the Sacramento River, allowing seasonal wild runs of salmon and steelhead to flourish.

== See also ==
- Lost Coast, another remote region of Northern California
