= South Fork Feather River =

Location
- Country: United States
- State: California
- Region: Middle Fork Feather Watershed

Physical characteristics
- Mouth: Ponderosa Reservoir^{A}
  - location: Butte County
- Basin size: 116 mi^{2} (300 km^{2}).
- Discharge
  - location: Enterprise
  - average: 305 cu ft/s (8.6 m^{3}/s)
  - minimum: 0.5 cu ft/s (0.014 m^{3}/s)
  - maximum: 19,200 cu ft/s (540 m^{3}/s)
- ^{A}Prior to Oroville Dam construction, the South Fork flowed to the Middle Fork Feather River.

The South Fork Feather River is a Lake Oroville tributary in the south portion of the Middle Fork Feather Watershed which drains several reservoirs including Little Grass Valley Reservoir.

Course of the South Fork Feather River & Lake Oroville South Arm This list is incomplete; you can help by expanding it.
	description	coordinates
headwaters	headpoint, Pilot Peak	
South Fork	source, SSW of peak	
South Fork	road, La Porte	
South Fork in Little Grass Valley Reservoir	inflow, reservoir	
South Fork in Little Grass Valley Reservoir	confluence, Black Rock Creek	
South Fork in Little Grass Valley Reservoir	inflow, diversion from Slate Creek	
South Fork in Little Grass Valley Reservoir	confluence, Tooms Creek	
South Fork in Little Grass Valley Reservoir	dam, Little Grass Valley	
South Fork	border, Plumas/Butte counties	
South Fork	confluence, Post Creek	
South Fork	dam, South Fork Diversion 63-004	
South Fork	confluence, Rock Creek	
South Fork	confluence, Know-nothing Creek	
South Fork	confluence, Lost Creek	
South Fork	dam	
South Fork	confluence, Oroleve Creek	
South Fork	dam	
Ponderosa; Reservoir & Lake Oroville; South Arm	mouth, South F @ Ponderosa Reservoir	
Ponderosa; Reservoir & Lake Oroville; South Arm	dam, Ponderosa Reservoir	
Ponderosa; Reservoir & Lake Oroville; South Arm	road, Ponderosa Way	
Ponderosa; Reservoir & Lake Oroville; South Arm	inflow, L Oroville South Arm	
Ponderosa; Reservoir & Lake Oroville; South Arm	confluence, Sucker Run	
Ponderosa; Reservoir & Lake Oroville; South Arm	road, Lumpkin	
Ponderosa; Reservoir & Lake Oroville; South Arm	channel @ Enterprise Boat Ramp (BR)	
Ponderosa; Reservoir & Lake Oroville; South Arm	former town, Enterprise confluence, Powell Creek	
Ponderosa; Reservoir & Lake Oroville; South Arm	channel @ Stringtown Car-Top BR	
former Feather; River (prior to Lake; Oroville)	mouth (former), South F w/ Middle F	
former Feather; River (prior to Lake; Oroville)	outflow, Lake Oroville East Arm road, Olive Hwy (CA 162) inflow, Lake Oroville Main Basin	
former Feather; River (prior to Lake; Oroville)	former confluence, North F w/ Feather r	

== See also ==
- List of rivers of California
