= Feather River =

Feather River Río de las Plumas
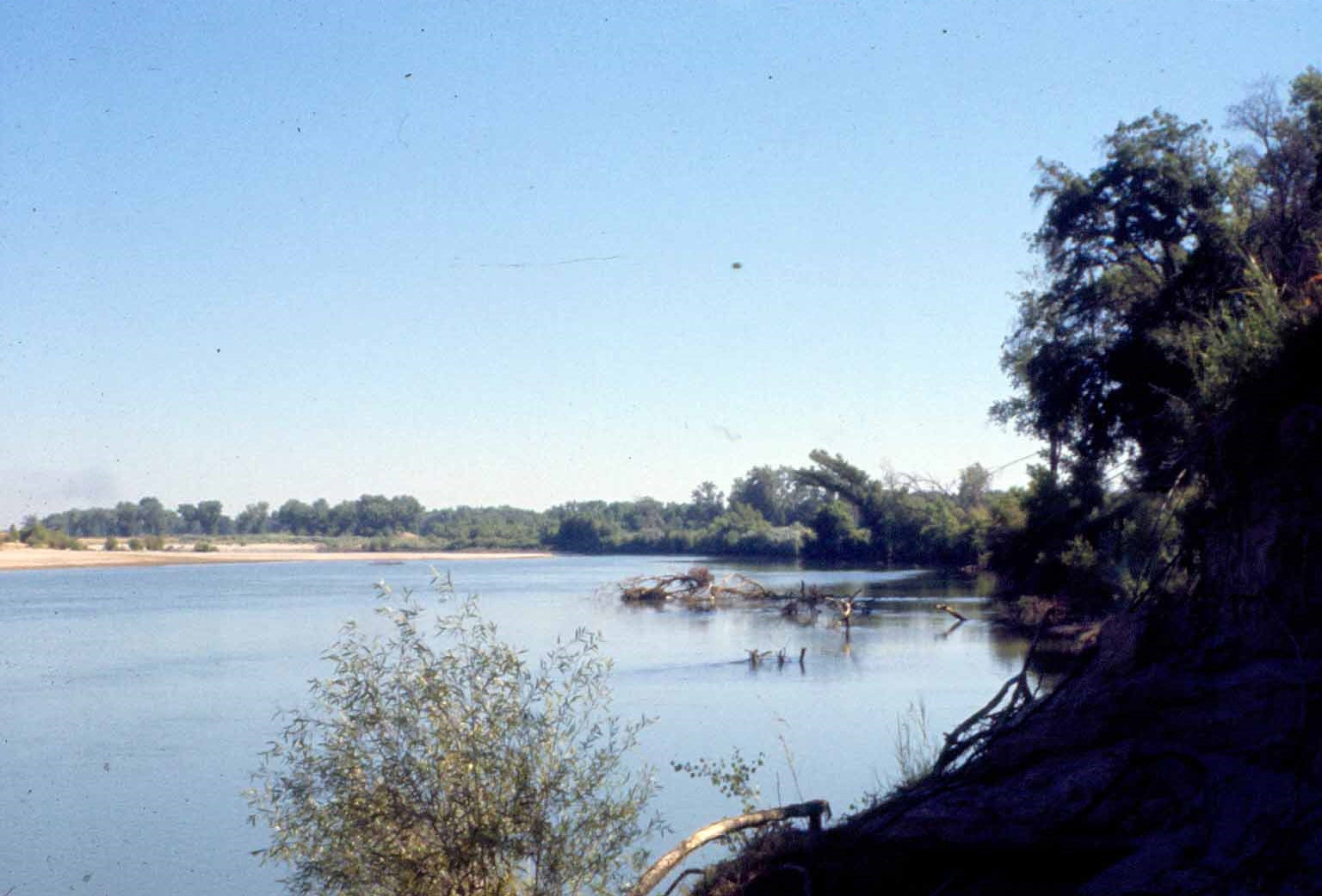
- The Feather River near its confluence with the Bear River

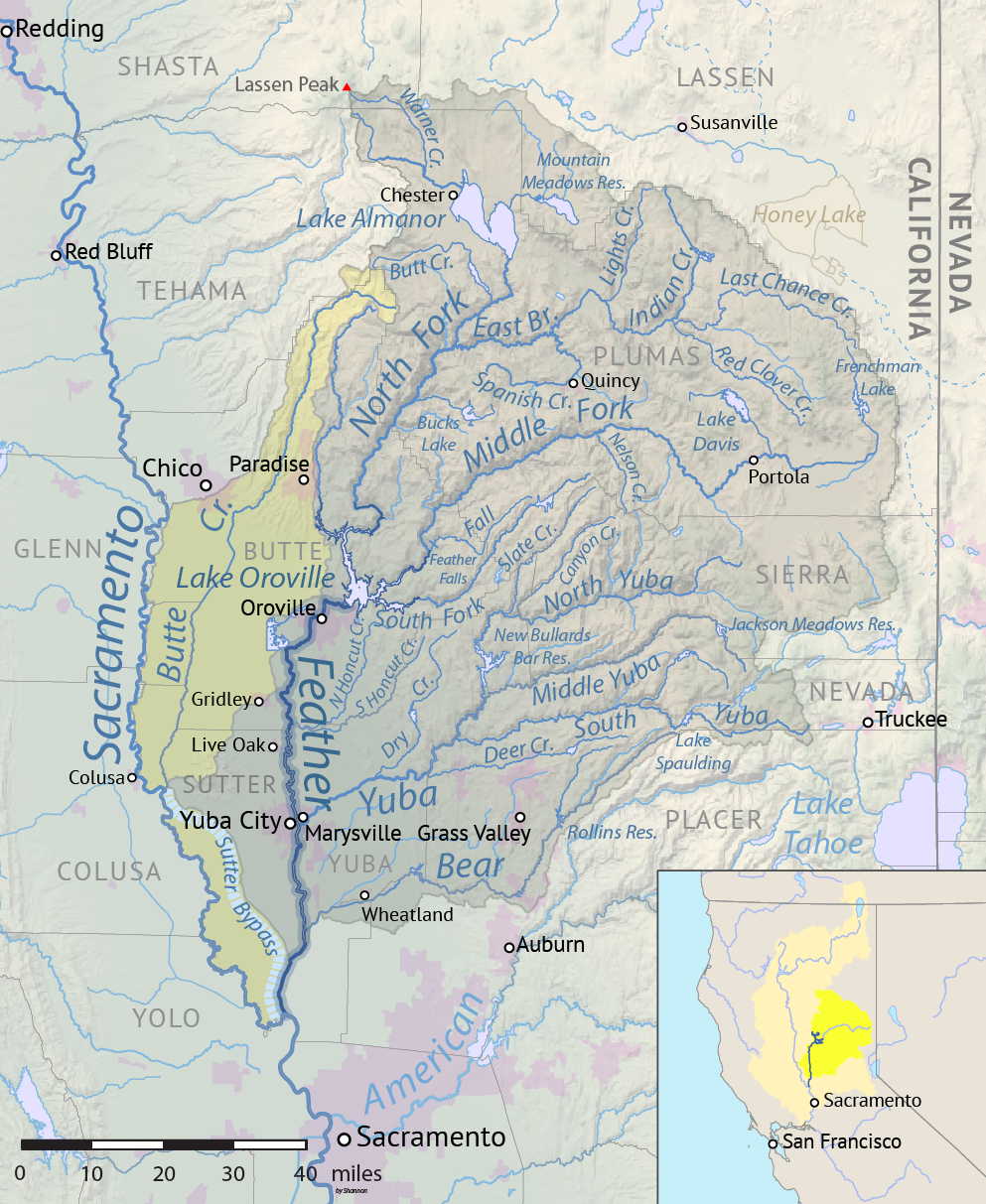
- Map of the Feather River watershed. The artificially connected Sutter Basin and Butte Creek drainage basins are indicated in yellow.

Location
- Country: United States
- State: California
- Region: Butte County, Yuba County, Sutter County
- Cities: Oroville, Yuba City, Marysville

Physical characteristics
- Source: North Fork Feather River
  - location: Confluence of Rice Creek and South Arm Rice Creek, Plumas County
  - coordinates: 40°21′47″N 121°27′05″W
  - length: 111 mi (179 km)
  - elevation: 5,436 ft (1,657 m)
- 2nd source: Middle Fork Feather River
  - location: Near Beckwourth, Sierra Valley, Plumas County
  - coordinates: 39°48′49″N 120°22′46″W
  - length: 129 mi (208 km)
  - elevation: 4,872 ft (1,485 m)
- Source confluence: Lake Oroville
  - location: Upstream of Oroville Dam
  - coordinates: 39°32′14″N 121°29′00″W
  - elevation: 902 ft (275 m)
- Mouth: Sacramento River
  - location: Verona
  - coordinates: 38°47′08″N 121°37′17″W
  - elevation: 26 ft (7.9 m)
- Length: 73 mi (117 km), North-south
- Basin size: 6,197 sq mi (16,050 km^{2})
- Discharge
  - location: Nicolaus
  - average: 8,321 cu ft/s (235.6 m^{3}/s)
  - minimum: 222 cu ft/s (6.3 m^{3}/s)
  - maximum: 357,000 cu ft/s (10,100 m^{3}/s)

Basin features
- River system: Sacramento River Basin
- Tributaries
  - left: Yuba River, Bear River
  - right: Sutter Bypass

National Wild and Scenic River
- Type: Wild, Scenic, Recreational
- Designated: October 2, 1968

The Feather River is the principal tributary of the Sacramento River, in the Sacramento Valley of Northern California. The river's main stem is about 73 miles (117 km) long. Its length to its most distant headwater tributary is just over 210 miles (340 km). The main stem Feather River begins in Lake Oroville, where its four long tributary forks join—the South Fork, Middle Fork, North Fork, and West Branch Feather Rivers. These and other tributaries drain part of the northern Sierra Nevada, and the extreme southern Cascades, as well as a small portion of the Sacramento Valley. The total drainage basin is about 6,200 square miles (16,000 km^{2}), with approximately 3,604 square miles (9,330 km^{2}) above Lake Oroville.

The Feather River and its forks were a center of gold mining during the 19th century. Since the 1960s, the river has provided water to central and southern California, as the main source of water for the California State Water Project. Its water is also used for hydroelectricity generation. The average annual flow of the Feather River is more than 7 million acre-feet (8.6 km^{3}).

The Feather is unique in that two of its tributaries, the East Branch and Middle Fork, originate east of the Sierra Nevada in the Diamond Mountains and breach the crest of the Sierra as they flow west.

== Course ==
The river rises in four main forks in the Sierra Nevada which unite as arms of the Lake Oroville reservoir in the foothills 5 miles (8.0 km) northeast of Oroville in eastern Butte County. In terms of drainage area, the largest is the North Fork, which drains about 60% of the entire upper Feather River watershed. The Middle Fork is the second largest, draining about 32% of the upper basin. The South Fork and the West Branch are much smaller, each draining less than 5% of the upper basin. The main stem Feather River begins at Oroville Dam, the outlet of Lake Oroville. From there the river flows generally south across the Sacramento Valley, east of the Sutter Buttes, past Oroville and Yuba City–Marysville. The Feather receives the Yuba River from the east at Yuba City and the Bear River from the east 15 miles (24 km) south of Yuba City. It empties into the Sacramento River from the north, about 20 miles (32 km) northwest of Sacramento.

=== North Fork ===
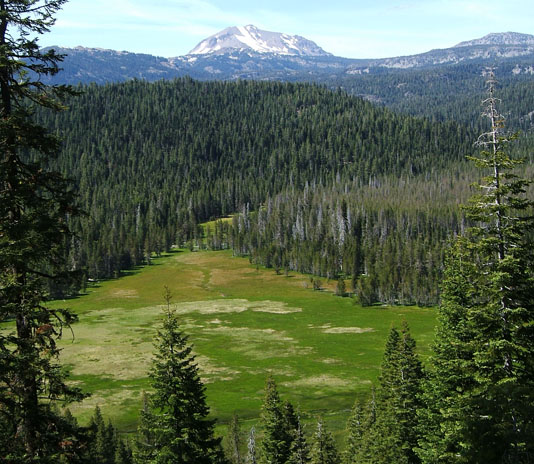
Buzzard Springs, partial source of the North Fork Feather River, near Rice Creek and with Lassen Peak in the background

The North Fork Feather River begins in Feather River Meadows at the junction of Rice Creek and South Arm Rice Creek, 40°21′47″N 121°27′5″W. The names and confluence locations of the streams in this area were changed by the Board on Geographic Names in 1927. USGS topographic maps, as of 1995, are mislabeled for South Arm, North Arm Rice Creek, Rice Creek and North Fork Feather River. Rice Creek, labeled North Arm Rice Creek on USGS topo maps, flows south from its source at Cold Boiling Lake, 40°27′24″N 121°29′4″W, in Lassen Volcanic National Park, through Crumbaugh Lake, and south to join the South Arm Rice Creek, forming the North Fork Feather River.

The North Fork's length is about 100 miles (160 km), or about 111 miles (179 km) including Rice Creek. The total length of the Feather River from the source of Rice Creek to the Sacramento River is about 184 miles (296 km).

From its source in Feather River Meadows the North Fork flows east. A tributary emerges from Buzzard Springs and flows into the Stump Ranch Marsh Area, where it joins the North Fork, which then flows southeast to Lake Almanor, a reservoir created by Canyon Dam. Below Canyon Dam the North Fork flows generally southwest through the Sierra Nevada, receiving the East Branch North Fork Feather River near Belden.

The North Fork continues flowing south below the East Branch confluence. Bucks Creek, which drains Bucks Lake near Bucks Lake, California, joins from east. The North Fork flows southeast into Butte County, becoming the northern arm of Lake Oroville. Before Oroville Dam was built the mouth of the North Fork was located at 39°33′20″N 121°28′0″W. After the North Fork's mouth was inundated by Lake Oroville the North Fork's mouth was changed to be at 39°43′27″N 121°28′19″W, according to the USGS.

The North Fork Feather River drains 2,156 square miles (5,580 km^{2})—1,131 square miles (2,930 km^{2}) for the North Fork itself and 1,025 square miles (2,650 km^{2}) for East Branch North Fork. The average discharge for the two streams is about 1,930 cubic feet per second (55 m^{3}/s) for the North Fork, and 1,000 cubic feet per second (28 m^{3}/s) for the East Branch.

==== East Branch ====
The East Branch is one of the major tributaries of the Feather River system. It originates at 40°2′16″N 120°58′57″W, at the confluence of Indian Creek and Spanish Creek. Indian Creek is another long and important tributary, flowing from its source at 40°18′34″N 120°41′36″W, on the south slopes of Diamond Mountain, south and west, through Indian Valley and north of American Valley. Impounded at Antelope Dam, Indian Creek then joins Spanish Creek to form the East Branch North Fork Feather River. The longest tributary of Indian Creek is Last Chance Creek, which rises in eastern Plumas County at 40°0′47″N 120°12′10″W, south of Honey Lake, and flows generally west, joining Indian Creek at the western end of Genesee Valley. From its source at the Indian and Spanish Creeks confluence, the East Branch North Fork flows west past Twain and joins the North Fork near Belden.

The East Branch's main stem length is about 18 miles (29 km). Indian Creek is about 52.5 miles (84.5 km) long, and Last Chance Creek is about 45 miles (72 km) long. The East Branch's most distant headwater is Last Chance Creek's source. The total length from the mouth of the East Branch to the source of Last Chance Creek is about 89 miles (143 km). The total length of the Feather River from the source of Last Chance Creek to the Sacramento River is about 215 miles (346 km).

=== Middle Fork ===
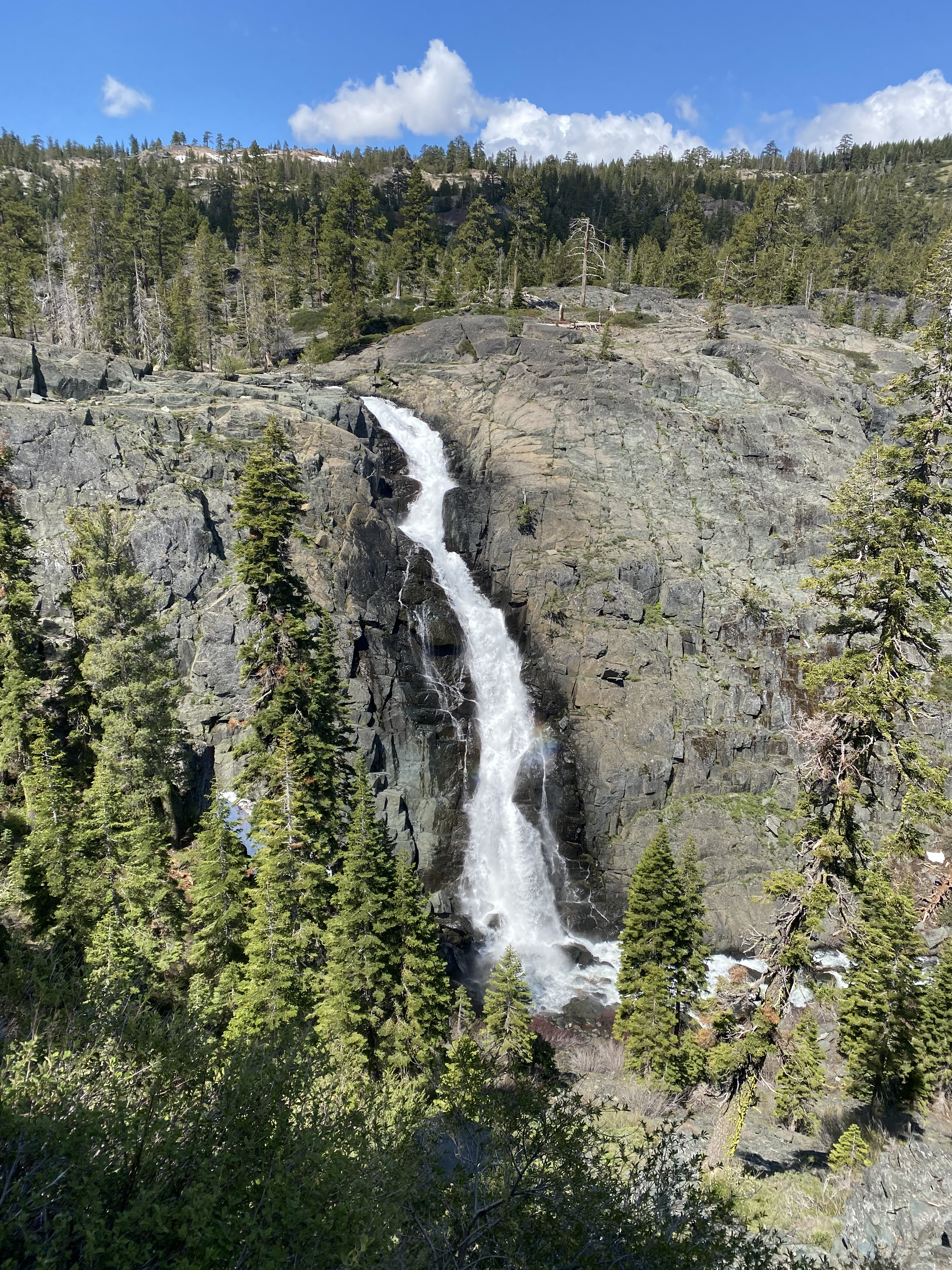
Frazier Creek Falls in Plumas National Forest is part of the Middle Fork watershed

The Middle Fork Feather River begins at 39°48′49″N 120°22′46″W, in southeastern Plumas County about 0.5 miles (0.80 km) south of Beckwourth, at the north end of the Sierra Valley. It is formed by the joining of a number of tributaries that merge in an inverted river delta wetland with a complex network of irrigation ditches and drains called the Sierra Valley Channels. A number of creeks merge in the Sierra Valley, the longest of which is Little Last Chance Creek, which originates at 40°1′9″N 120°13′15″W and flows south through Frenchman Lake and Last Chance Valley to the Sierra Valley, where it divides into two distributary channels. Other tributaries that join to form the Middle Fork in the Sierra Valley include Carman Creek, Fletcher Creek, Turner Creek, Berry Creek, Hamlin Creek, Sierraville Creek, and Smithneck Creek.

Flowing west through the mountains from its source in the Sierra Valley the Middle Fork is joined by Big Grizzly Creek, which drains Lake Davis to the north. Then the river flows through Portola and Delleker in the Humbug Valley. Sulphur Creek joins in the Mohawk Valley at Clio. Continuing west, the Middle Fork passes between Graeagle and Blairsden and further downstream south of Sloat in Long Valley. At Sloat, Long Valley Creek and Polar Creek enters the Feather. The Feather then enters a long and deep gorge. It is joined by numerous small tributaries. The Pacific Crest Trail crosses near Onion Valley Creek. The Middle Fork turns to flow southwest and south, through Bald Rock Canyon and the Feather River Canyon and on into the middle arm of Lake Oroville.

The Middle Fork's main stem length is about 95 miles (153 km), or about 129 miles (208 km) including Little Last Chance Creek. The total length of the Feather River from the source of Little Last Chance Creek to the Sacramento River is about 202 miles (325 km).

=== South Fork ===
The South Fork Feather River originates in southern Plumas County near the Plumas-Sierra county line, at 39°46′48″N 120°52′26″W. It heads on the southwest slope of Pilot Peak, just north of Gibsonville Ridge and Bunker Hill Ridge. It flows west and southwest to Little Grass Valley Reservoir, an impoundment created by Little Grass Valley Dam. Below the dam the South Fork flows southwest between Mooreville Ridge and Lumpkin Ridge and enters Butte County. Just before entering Lake Oroville the Ponderosa Diversion Dam impounds the South Fork in the Ponderosa Reservoir. Below the dam the river becomes the south arm of Lake Oroville. The mouth of the South Fork is considered to be where the river empties into Ponderosa Reservoir, 39°32′55″N 121°16′39″W. The mouth was formerly located farther west at 39°33′5″N 121°25′20″W, until it was inundated by Lake Oroville. The total stream distance from the head of the South Fork to the juncture with the Middle Fork in Lake Oroville is 44.5 miles (71.6 km).

=== West Branch ===
The 46.4-mile-long (74.7 km) West Branch Feather River, sometimes called the West Fork Feather River, has a drainage area that is small but slightly larger than that of the South Fork. It originates in Butte County at 40°4′40″N 121°25′24″W, in Lassen National Forest. It flows southwest through Snag Lake and by Coon Hollow, after which it is joined by Philbrook Creek, which drains Philbook Reservoir to the east. From there the West Branch flows more directly south and leaves Lassen National Forest. It is joined by Fish Creek and Last Chance Creek (there are several streams named Last Chance Creek in the Feather River watershed). Downstream from Last Chance Creek a diversion dam draws off some of the West Branch's water. The diverted water flows into Hendricks Canal, a 8.66-mile (13.94 km) long conduit composed of ditch, flume, and tunnel sections, with a capacity of 125 cubic feet per second (3.5 m^{3}/s). Along with other facilities, such as Philbrook Reservoir, Hendricks Canal is part of the Toadtown development, which conveys water through the several canals and powerhouses. The water ultimately empties into Butte Creek, a tributary of the Sacramento River. Another diversion dam on the West Branch Feather River near Magalia, called the Magalia 73 Dam, conveys water into the Upper Miocene Canal, which runs to Kunkle Reservoir and the Lime Saddle Powerhouse on Lake Oroville. From the powerhouse water is carried by the Middle Miocene Canal to the Coal Canyon Powerhouse and on into the Oroville–Thermalito Complex. The Miocene Canal and Lime Saddle Powerhouse are part of the DeSabla Regional Bundle of hydroelectric facilities operated by the Pacific Gas and Electric Company.

The West Branch Feather River flows by Stirling City and is joined by Big Kimshew Creek and the Little West Fork West Branch Feather River. Concow Creek, flowing southwest from Concow Reservoir, joins just before the West Branch empties into the northwest arm of Oroville Lake, near Paradise.

== Drainage basin ==
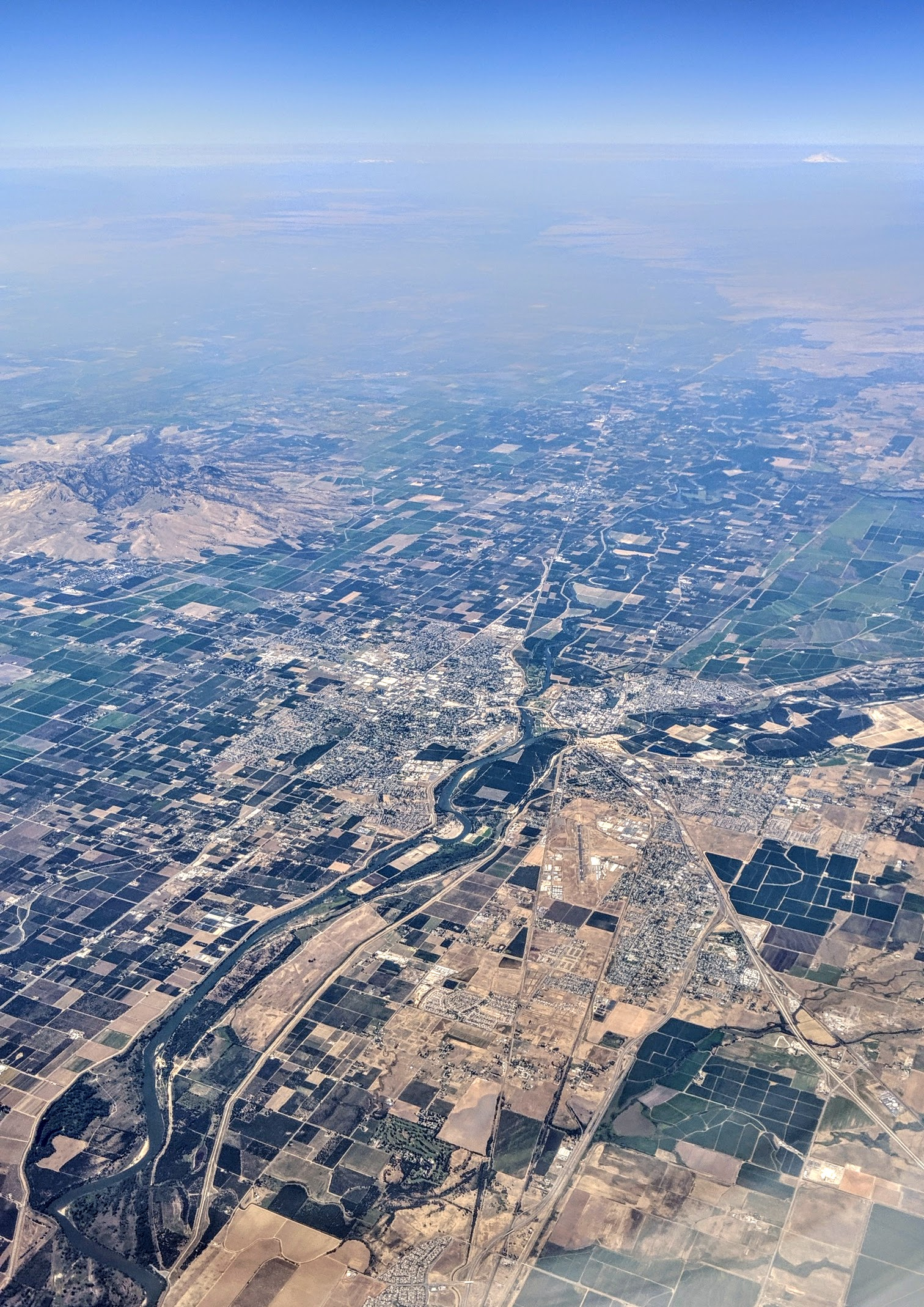
Aerial view of the region of the confluence of the Feather and Yuba rivers at Marysville and Yuba City

The United States Forest Service manages over 80% of the Feather River's upper watershed, in the mountains above Lake Oroville. The alluvial valleys in this area are mostly privately owned and used for livestock grazing and hay production. In terms of drainage area, the North Fork Feather River is the largest, accounting for about 60% of the total basin above Lake Oroville. The Middle Fork drains about 32% of the upper basin. Other forks and tributaries drain much smaller areas—the West Fork accounts for about 5%, and the South Fork about 3%.

There are several important valleys in the otherwise mountainous upper basin. The Sierra Valley comprises an area of about 590 square miles (1,500 km^{2}) is located where a number of tributaries come together to form the Middle Fork. The valley's elevation is nearly 5,000 feet (1,500 m). It is known as the largest high-alpine valley in the continental United States. It also lies along the Pacific Flyway, making it an important seasonal home to migrating birds. Settlements in the valley include Loyalton, Sierraville, and Beckwourth, with Portola just west of Sierra Valley.

The American Valley is located in the middle of the upper Feather basin. Spanish Creek and Greenhorn Creek join in the valley, and Spanish Creek flows north to join Indian Creek, forming the East Branch North Fork Feather River. American Valley is about 3,410 feet (1,040 m) in elevation and supports a population of about 6,500. The largest community is Quincy. Historically, American Valley was a floodplain, but settlers drained the wet meadows to create pasture for cattle and fields for hay production. Today the stream channels are deeply incised and floods rare. These alternations affected the valley's ecology. Beavers, which were once prevalent, were nearly eliminated. This in turn had a large effect on the valley's hydrology.

Indian Valley is the third important alluvial valley of the upper basin. It is located along lower Indian Creek, near its confluence with Lights Creek. By the end of the 19th century Indian Valley was considered the most important valley of Plumas County and its swampy land was developed into a prosperous agricultural landscape. Communities in Indian Valley include Greenville and Taylorsville.

Two large endorheic lakes, Eagle Lake and Honey Lake, lie north of the upper Feather River basin, across the Diamond Mountains.

== History ==
Historically, the Maidu were the main Native American inhabitants of the upper Feather River basin's American, Indian, and Sierra Valleys. Maidu villages were located in the Big Meadows area, now inundated by Lake Almanor, and in American Valley where Quincy is now located. The Maidu migrated to the Sierra Valley in the spring and summer, but did not stay during the harsh winters. The Washoe hunted in the upper Feather River basin, especially in Long Valley, Sierra Valley, and Mohawk Valley. There is evidence of Paiute and Washoe settlements in the Long Valley area.

In 1836, John Marsh, Jose Noriega and a company of men, went on an exploration of Northern California. They felled trees, made dugout canoes, and ascended the Sacramento River. They proceeded up a tributary, and found a place where the whole surface was covered in feathers. They named it El Rio de las Plumas, River of the Feathers.

The 1849 California Gold Rush brought a flood of prospectors and settlers to the region. The American and Indian Valleys were settled in the 1850s. In the Sierra Valley the first settlers arrived in 1852.

== The Feather River Route ==
The Western Pacific Railroad operated a railroad through the Feather River canyon. This route was selected because it leads to a low pass over the Sierra Nevada mountains. The Western Pacific California Zephyr trains used this route and had a feather in their logo to represent the river. Today, there is no scheduled passenger service along the Feather River Route. The present day California Zephyr, run by Amtrak, operates over Donner Pass.

== River modifications ==
Since 1967, the Feather River's origin at the confluence of its four forks has been submerged under the waters of Lake Oroville, created by the construction of Oroville Dam in 1967. At about 770 feet (230 m) high, it is the tallest dam in the United States and wields nearly complete control over the flow of the Feather River by creating one of the largest reservoirs in California. The dam was built with the purpose of preventing the frequent floods that often inundated this part of the Sacramento Valley, and to store water for agricultural uses downstream during the dry season. The dam is the principal feature for the California State Water Project, storing water for more than 23 million people and 750,000 acres (300,000 ha) of farmland in Central and Southern California

Directly downstream from Oroville Dam lies the Oroville-Thermalito Complex, which consists of two reservoirs, a Forebay and Afterbay, both used for hydroelectricity generation. Although the water diverted from the Feather for this purpose is returned to the river, the water of downstream canals do not, except in the form of irrigation return flows (agricultural waste water). Downstream of Oroville, the river's flow is sucked away by numerous irrigation canals that supply water to the agricultural businesses of the lower Feather River valley. The heavy usage of water from the river has reduced its flow significantly.

The Feather's main tributaries, the Yuba and the Bear, are also impounded by large dams that provide irrigation water and flood control. New Bullards Bar Dam and Englebright Dam are located on the Yuba, and Rollins Dam and Camp Far West are situated on the Bear. Smaller dams now also block other tributaries, including the Middle, South and North Forks of the Feather. The watershed's high mountain streams are often utilized in complex schemes for hydroelectricity generation, including the Pacific Gas and Electric Canyon Power Project on the North Fork, which uses water from Lake Almanor, and the Yuba Hydroelectric Project which taps the Middle and South Forks of the Yuba River.

Water diversions, especially from Lake Oroville, has reduced the streamflow of the Feather River. The USGS has operated a stream gage downriver of Oroville Dam since 1902. The river's average annual discharge between 1902 and 1967, before the dam was built, was 5,834 cubic feet per second (165.2 m^{3}/s). From 1969 to 2009 the average flow is 1,086 cubic feet per second (30.8 m^{3}/s), mainly due to diversion for power generation at the Thermalito pumped-storage plant. Most of this water is returned to the river further downstream via a tailrace canal. The maximum discharge at this stream gauge was 230,000 cubic feet per second (6,500 m^{3}/s), recorded on March 19, 1907. The minimum was 222 cubic feet per second (6.3 m^{3}/s), recorded on September 19, 1972.

== Ecology ==
The riparian area of the Feather River supports a rich biodiversity of native flora and fauna. The Sierra Nevada reaches have considerable wild river features and steep gradients. In lower reaches, after joining of the forks, there is also significant habitat; near Yuba City, for example, there are extents of the river with numerous valley oak trees with understory of wild grape.

The Feather River stonecrop (Sedum albomarginatum) is a rare plant endemic to the Feather River watershed.

The California Office of Environmental Health Hazard Assessment (OEHHA) has developed a safe eating advisory for the upper and lower sections of Feather River based on levels of mercury found in fish caught from this water body.

== See also ==
- Adventist Health Feather River
- Clio trestle
- List of rivers of California
- Feather Canyon
