= Ololopa, California =

Ololopa (also, Ho-lil-li-pah, Hol-o-lu-pai, Holil-le-pas, Holilepau, Hololipi, Jollillepas, O-lip-as, Oleepas) is a former Maidu settlement in Butte County, California, United States. It was located near Oroville on the Feather River; its precise location is unknown.
