= Nigger Jack =

Nigger Jack may refer to:

- Nigger Jack, a nickname of John J. Pershing
- Nigger Jack Slough, a former name of Jack Slough, a stream in California
