= Rock Creek (California) =

Rock Creek (California) may refer to the following streams:

- Rock Creek (Feather River, Lake Oroville), a tributary of Lake Oroville's North Arm (39°42′58″N 121°27′19″W)
- Rock Creek (Feather River, Middle Fork), a Middle Fork Feather River tributary (via Smithneck Creek) with headwaters on the Sierra Crest (Babbitt Peak, 39°36′8″N 120°6′21″W)
- Rock Creek (Feather River, North Fork), a left North Fork Feather River tributary (via Hamilton Branch) with headwaters west of the Sierra Crest (39°35′30″N 120°05′46″W)
- Rock Creek (Feather River, North Fork), a right North Fork Feather River tributary with headwaters near Spring Valley Mountain (40°00′45″N 121°23′42″W)
- Rock Creek (Feather River, South Fork), a South Fork Feather River tributary (39°37′13″N 121°08′29″W).
- Rock Creek (Kern River tributary), a North Fork Kern River tributary with headwaters on the Sierra Crest (Mount Langley)
- Rock Creek (Owens River tributary), an Owens River tributary with headwaters on the Sierra Crest (Bear Creek Spire, 37°27′20″N 118°44′08″W)
- Rock Creek (Tuolumne River), a Tuolumne River tributary (via Piute Creek) with headwaters on the Sierra Crest (38°05′49″N 119°27′16″W)
- Rock Creek (Yuba River, South Fork), a South Yuba River tributary (39°18′43″N 121°02′59″W)
