= Portola, California =

City in California, United States

- City
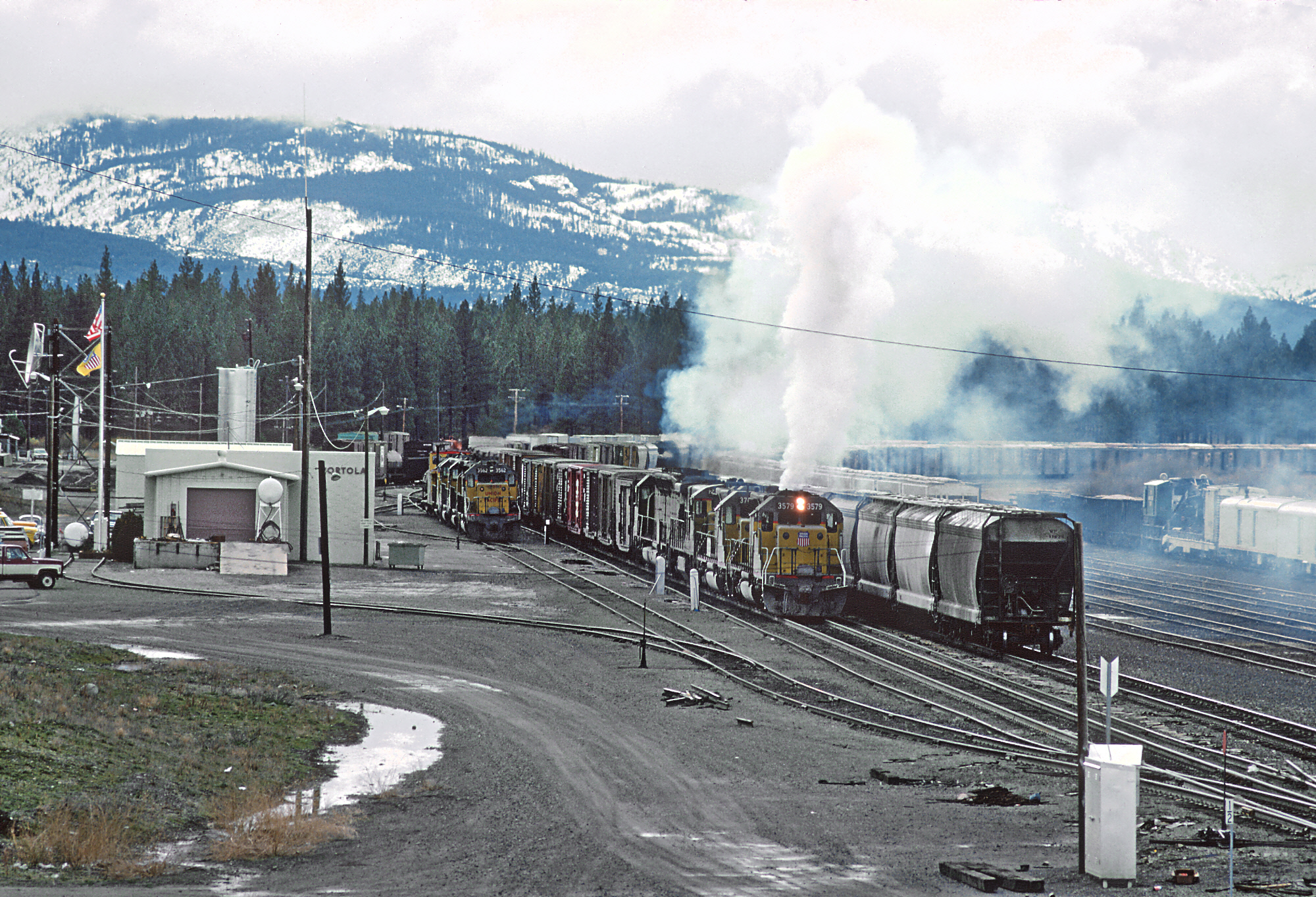
- Union Pacific trains in Portola
- Interactive map of Portola, California
- Location in the United States
- Coordinates: 39°48′37″N 120°28′11″W
- Country: United States
- State: California
- County: Plumas
- Incorporated: May 16, 1946

Area
  - Total: 5.41 sq mi (14.00 km^{2})
  - Land: 5.41 sq mi (14.00 km^{2})
  - Water: 0 sq mi (0.00 km^{2}) 0%
- Elevation: 4,860 ft (1,480 m)

Population (2020)
  - Total: 2,100
  - Density: 390/sq mi (150/km^{2})
- Time zone: UTC-8 (Pacific (PST))
  - Summer (DST): UTC-7 (PDT)
- ZIP codes: 96122, 96129
- Area code: 530
- FIPS code: 06-58352
- GNIS feature IDs: 1659425, 2411473
- Website: www.cityofportola.gov

Portola (/pɔːrˈtoʊlə/ por-TOH-lə) is the only incorporated city in Plumas County, California, United States. The population was 2,100 at the 2020 census, down from 2,104 at the 2010 census. Portola is located on the Middle Fork of the Feather River and was named after Spanish explorer Gaspar de Portolá, although he did not explore this area.

Portola is a crew change site on the Western Pacific Railroad (now Union Pacific Railroad) Feather River Route over the Sierra Nevada. The city is also home to the Western Pacific Railroad Museum (formerly Portola Railroad Museum), one of the largest railroad museums in the Western United States. The museum is famous for its Run A Locomotive program, where the public can participate in a "fantasy experience" program allowing them to run a railroad locomotive on the museum grounds. The railroad tradition also extends to a yearly local event called “Railroad Days”.

Portola was in the national media spotlight in 1996–1997 when a conflict occurred between the local community and the Department of Fish and Game over how to deal with an invasive species of northern pike in Lake Davis. The lake was chemically treated in 1997 to eradicate the fish, but they reappeared in 1999. In early September 2007, the California Department of Fish and Game eradicated the pike using CFT Legumine, a new liquid formulation of rotenone.

== Geography ==
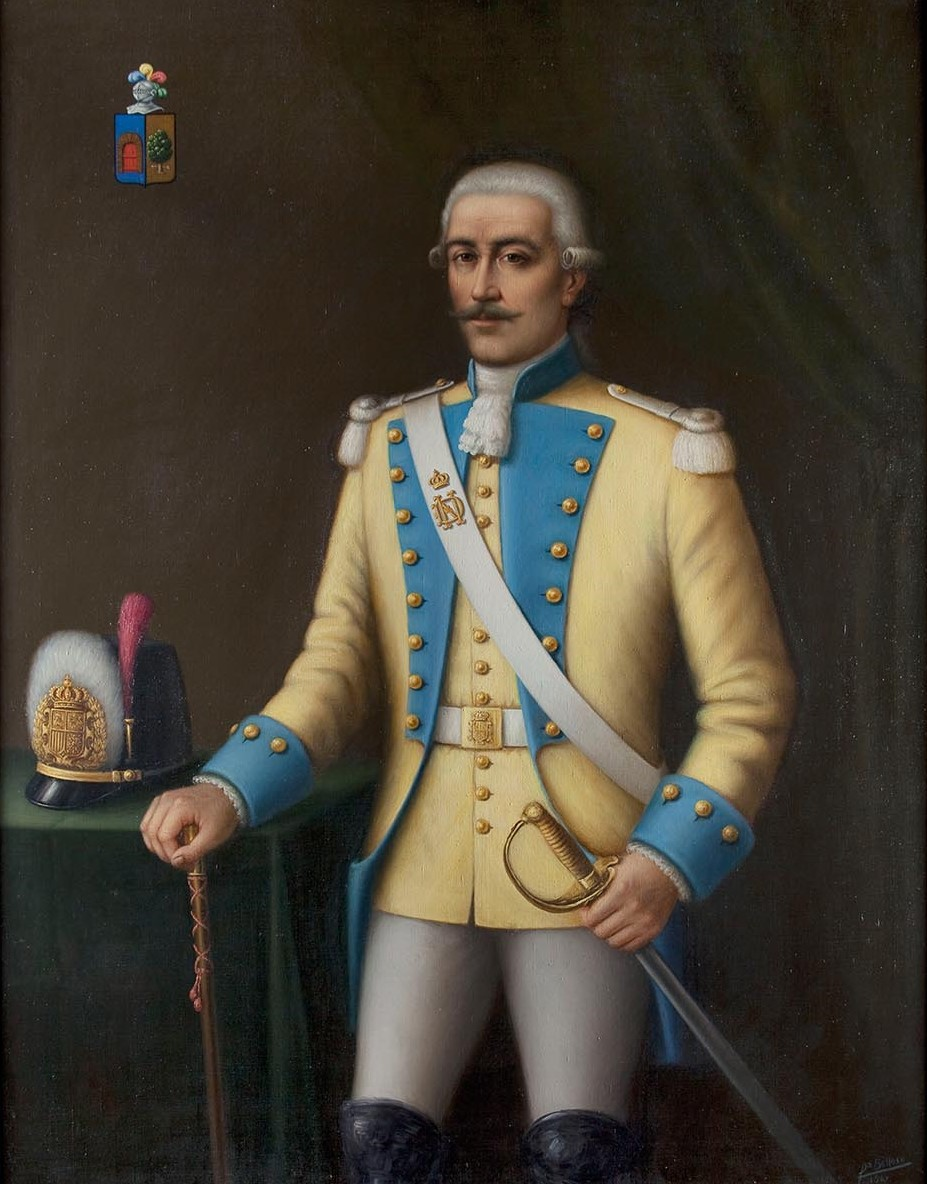
The city of Portola is named after Gaspar de Portolá, first Governor of the Californias and leader of the Portolá expedition.

The town of Portola sits along both sides of the middle fork of the Feather River, in Plumas County, on the upper eastern part of Northern California. Portola lies off the eastern slopes of the Sierra Nevada. The local landscape is best described as being part of the Feather River drainage, which flows westward down the Feather River Canyon.

Portola is located at 39°48′37″N 120°28′11″W.

According to the United States Census Bureau, the city has a total area of 5.4 square miles (14 km^{2}), all land.

Portola lies on the Middle Fork of the Feather River in the Sierra Nevada mountain range. The headwaters of the Middle Fork of the Feather River originate just east of Portola in Sierra Valley, near Beckwourth.

Lake Davis is located approximately 6 miles (9.7 km) north of Portola, and is a popular fishing and camping location. About 15 miles (24 km) to the west and southwest of Portola, Plumas-Eureka State Park and Lakes Basin Recreation Area feature granite peaks, glacial lakes, streams, and temperate coniferous forests, which make them popular destinations for outdoor enthusiasts.

=== Climate ===
Being on the eastern slopes of the Sierra Nevada, Portola has a continental Mediterranean climate (Köppen: Dsb) with dry summers characterized by extreme diurnal temperature swings, and cold (though not severe) and snowy winters. Frosts occur on 200 mornings per year, although all but eleven afternoons top freezing. Extreme cold is rare and temperatures below 0 °F (−17.8 °C) are observed on only 2.6 mornings per winter in an average year. During the summer, daytime temperatures of 100 °F (37.8 °C) are reached on average only once every two years.

Climate data for Portola, California (1991–2020 normals, extremes 1915–present, snowfall from XMACIS (2006–2025)
Month	Jan	Feb	Mar	Apr	May	Jun	Jul	Aug	Sep	Oct	Nov	Dec	Year
Record high °F (°C)	68 (20)	72 (22)	80 (27)	86 (30)	94 (34)	110 (43)	110 (43)	107 (42)	100 (38)	92 (33)	82 (28)	72 (22)	110 (43)
Mean maximum °F (°C)	58 (14)	60 (16)	67 (19)	75 (24)	84 (29)	91 (33)	96 (36)	95 (35)	90 (32)	82 (28)	68 (20)	56 (13)	97 (36)
Mean daily maximum °F (°C)	43.0 (6.1)	46.0 (7.8)	51.0 (10.6)	57.7 (14.3)	67.0 (19.4)	77.2 (25.1)	86.4 (30.2)	85.2 (29.6)	78.8 (26.0)	66.4 (19.1)	52.5 (11.4)	42.1 (5.6)	62.8 (17.1)
Daily mean °F (°C)	31.1 (−0.5)	33.5 (0.8)	37.9 (3.3)	43.4 (6.3)	51.0 (10.6)	58.7 (14.8)	65.5 (18.6)	63.9 (17.7)	58.0 (14.4)	48.1 (8.9)	38.3 (3.5)	30.5 (−0.8)	46.7 (8.1)
Mean daily minimum °F (°C)	19.3 (−7.1)	20.9 (−6.2)	24.9 (−3.9)	29.1 (−1.6)	35.1 (1.7)	40.1 (4.5)	44.6 (7.0)	42.6 (5.9)	37.1 (2.8)	29.7 (−1.3)	24.1 (−4.4)	18.9 (−7.3)	30.5 (−0.8)
Mean minimum °F (°C)	4 (−16)	6 (−14)	13 (−11)	19 (−7)	26 (−3)	30 (−1)	35 (2)	34 (1)	28 (−2)	21 (−6)	12 (−11)	2 (−17)	−2 (−19)
Record low °F (°C)	−24 (−31)	−21 (−29)	−12 (−24)	3 (−16)	13 (−11)	20 (−7)	22 (−6)	19 (−7)	12 (−11)	3 (−16)	−6 (−21)	−28 (−33)	−28 (−33)
Average precipitation inches (mm)	4.16 (106)	3.93 (100)	3.57 (91)	1.55 (39)	1.15 (29)	0.52 (13)	0.34 (8.6)	0.30 (7.6)	0.44 (11)	1.07 (27)	2.03 (52)	4.28 (109)	23.34 (593.2)
Average snowfall inches (cm)	17.3 (44)	15.8 (40)	25.5 (65)	3.6 (9.1)	0.5 (1.3)	0.0 (0.0)	0.0 (0.0)	0.0 (0.0)	0.2 (0.51)	0.7 (1.8)	4.1 (10)	17.8 (45)	85.5 (216.71)
Average precipitation days (≥ 0.01 in)	8.7	8.5	8.1	6.0	5.7	2.6	1.0	1.2	1.8	3.5	6.2	8.4	61.7
Average snowy days (≥ 0.1 in)	3.0	2.7	2.0	0.7	0.2	0.0	0.0	0.0	0.1	0.2	1.5	2.9	13.3
Source: NOAA

== Demographics ==
Historical population
Census	Pop.	Note	%±
1950	2,261		—
1960	1,874		−17.1%
1970	1,625		−13.3%
1980	1,885		16.0%
1990	2,193		16.3%
2000	2,227		1.6%
2010	2,104		−5.5%
2020	2,100		−0.2%
U.S. Decennial Census

=== 2020 census ===
As of the 2020 census, Portola had a population of 2,100 and a population density of 388.4 inhabitants per square mile (150.0/km^{2}). The median age was 41.0 years. 23.3% of residents were under the age of 18 and 20.2% of residents were 65 years of age or older. For every 100 females, there were 95.7 males, and for every 100 females age 18 and over, there were 92.9 males age 18 and over.

The census reported that 99.7% of the population lived in households, 0.3% lived in non-institutionalized group quarters, and no one was institutionalized. 0.0% of residents lived in urban areas, while 100.0% lived in rural areas.

There were 910 households, out of which 30.1% had children under the age of 18 living in them. Of all households, 40.8% were married-couple households, 7.7% were cohabiting couple households, 21.6% were households with a male householder and no spouse or partner present, and 29.9% were households with a female householder and no spouse or partner present. About 32.2% of all households were made up of individuals, and 16.0% had someone living alone who was 65 years of age or older. The average household size was 2.3. There were 563 families (61.9% of all households).

There were 1,077 housing units at an average density of 199.2 units per square mile (76.9 units/km^{2}), of which 910 (84.5%) were occupied. Of occupied units, 57.1% were owner-occupied and 42.9% were occupied by renters. Of all housing units, 15.5% were vacant. The homeowner vacancy rate was 5.7%, and the rental vacancy rate was 6.7%.

Racial composition as of the 2020 census
Race	Number	Percent
White	1,627	77.5%
Black or African American	9	0.4%
American Indian and Alaska Native	38	1.8%
Asian	21	1.0%
Native Hawaiian and Other Pacific Islander	14	0.7%
Some other race	126	6.0%
Two or more races	265	12.6%
Hispanic or Latino (of any race)	402	19.1%

=== Income and poverty ===
In 2023, the US Census Bureau estimated that the median household income was $42,385, and the per capita income was $21,378. About 26.1% of families and 27.3% of the population were below the poverty line.

=== 2010 census ===
The 2010 United States census reported that Portola had a population of 2,104. The population density was 389.1 inhabitants per square mile (150.2/km^{2}). The racial makeup of Portola was 1,762 (83.7%) White, 13 (0.6%) African American, 54 (2.6%) Native American, 12 (0.6%) Asian, 1 (0.0%) Pacific Islander, 198 (9.4%) from other races, and 64 (3.0%) from two or more races. Hispanic or Latino of any race were 342 persons (16.3%).

The Census reported that 2,080 people (98.9% of the population) lived in households, 0 (0%) lived in non-institutionalized group quarters, and 24 (1.1%) were institutionalized.

There were 887 households, out of which 278 (31.3%) had children under the age of 18 living in them, 378 (42.6%) were opposite-sex married couples living together, 114 (12.9%) had a female householder with no husband present, 53 (6.0%) had a male householder with no wife present. There were 68 (7.7%) unmarried opposite-sex partnerships, and 4 (0.5%) same-sex married couples or partnerships. 286 households (32.2%) were made up of individuals, and 113 (12.7%) had someone living alone who was 65 years of age or older. The average household size was 2.34. There were 545 families (61.4% of all households); the average family size was 2.92.

The population was spread out, with 502 people (23.9%) under the age of 18, 198 people (9.4%) aged 18 to 24, 462 people (22.0%) aged 25 to 44, 638 people (30.3%) aged 45 to 64, and 304 people (14.4%) who were 65 years of age or older. The median age was 39.8 years. For every 100 females, there were 93.4 males. For every 100 females age 18 and over, there were 89.8 males.

There were 1,134 housing units at an average density of 209.7 per square mile (81.0/km^{2}), of which 482 (54.3%) were owner-occupied, and 405 (45.7%) were occupied by renters. The homeowner vacancy rate was 6.8%; the rental vacancy rate was 21.0%. 1,156 people (54.9% of the population) lived in owner-occupied housing units and 924 people (43.9%) lived in rental housing units.

== Government ==
The city is governed by a five-member council. Council members serve staggered four-year terms. The council chooses the mayor and mayor pro tem.

In the California State Legislature, Portola is in the 1st senatorial district, represented by Republican Megan Dahle, and the 1st Assembly district, represented by Republican Heather Hadwick.

In the United States House of Representatives, Portola is in California's 3rd congressional district, represented by Independent Kevin Kiley.

== Education ==
The school district is Plumas Unified School District.
