= Enterprise, Butte County, California =

Enterprise
- Former settlement
- Location in California
- Coordinates: 39°32′11″N 121°21′51″W
- Country: United States
- State: California
- County: Butte
- Elevation: 902 ft (275 m)

Enterprise (formerly, Mountain Spring) is a former settlement in Butte County, California, United States. It was located 5 miles (8.0 km) west-northwest of Forbestown on the South Fork of the Feather River, at an elevation of 902 feet (275 m). In 1968, it was inundated by Lake Oroville.

A post office operated at Enterprise from 1878 to 1926, with a brief closure in 1903. The town was founded in 1852 as Mountain Spring and used as a construction camp. Its later economy was based on being a supply center for the mining operations nearby, especially near Bidwell's Bar. The mining town of Yankee Flat was located 5 miles (8.0 km) southeast of Enterprise.
