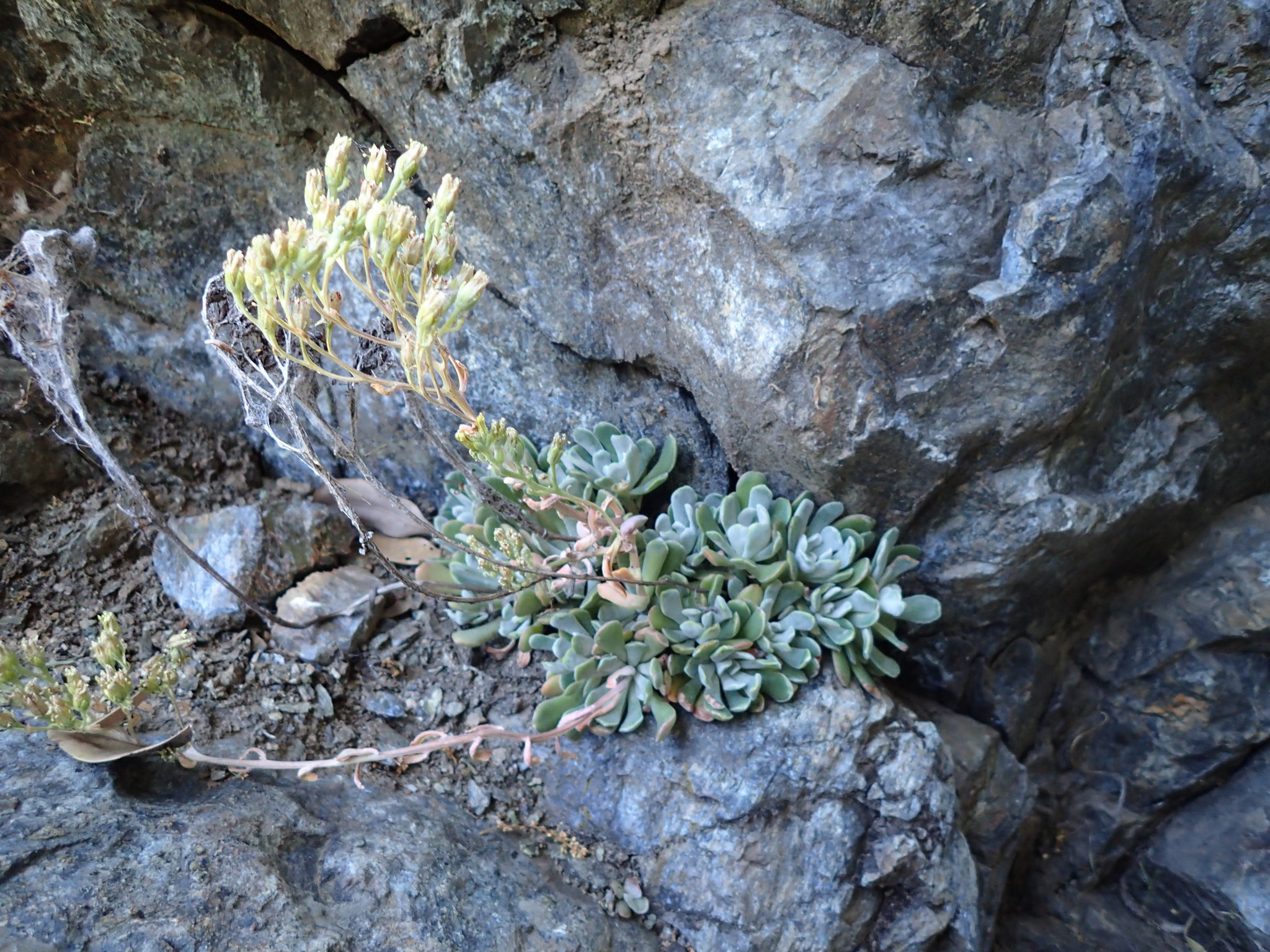

Conservation status
- Imperiled (NatureServe)

Scientific classification
- Kingdom: Plantae
- Clade: Tracheophytes
- Clade: Angiosperms
- Clade: Eudicots
- Order: Saxifragales
- Family: Crassulaceae
- Genus: Sedum
- Species: S. albomarginatum

Binomial name
- Sedum albomarginatum R.T.Clausen

= Sedum albomarginatum =

Species of succulent

Sedum albomarginatum is a rare species of flowering plant in the family Crassulaceae known by the common name Feather River stonecrop. It is endemic to California where it is known from fewer than 20 occurrences along the Feather River in Plumas and Butte Counties. It grows on steep cliffs and mountain slopes in rocky serpentine substrates.

== Description ==
Sedum albomarginatum is a small perennial succulent plant forming basal rosettes a few centimeters wide from a woody root system. The leaves are up to 7 cm long with the widest part near the distal end. The tip is rounded or slightly notched. Flowering shoots have smaller, oblanceolate leaves. The leaves are hairless, waxy, and blue-green in color. Young leaves often have characteristic white edges where the wax is thickest, but the wax wears off with time. The inflorescence is a spreading array of many flowers with light yellow petals up to a centimeter long each.

Threats to this rare Sedum species include erosion on the steep terrain where it grows, as well as mining and construction.
