= Jack Slough =

Stream in Yuba County, California, U.S.

Coordinates: 39.15850°N 121.60941°W

Jack Slough is a stream in the eastern Sacramento Valley, near Yuba City in Yuba County, California.

The slough is 16 miles long. It flows into the Feather River in Marysville. The Jack Slough Bridge on Highway 70 crosses Jack Slough, as does a Union Pacific Railroad Bridge. Jack Slough is most popular for fishing Largemouth bass, Smallmouth bass, and Black crappie.

It is a tributary of the Feather River.

== History ==
The stream was formerly called Nigger Jack Slough. The slough was likely named for a black miner in the California Gold Rush.

== See also ==
- List of rivers of California
