= Graeagle, California =

Graeagle
- Unincorporated Community; Census Designated Place
- Location in Plumas County and the state of California

- Location in the United States
- Coordinates: 39°45′52″N 120°37′24″W
- Country: United States
- State: California
- County: Plumas

Area
  - Total: 11.125 sq mi (28.814 km^{2})
  - Land: 11.068 sq mi (28.667 km^{2})
  - Water: 0.057 sq mi (0.148 km^{2}) 0.51%
- Elevation: 4,373 ft (1,333 m)

Population (2020)
  - Total: 724
  - Density: 65.4/sq mi (25.3/km^{2})
- Time zone: UTC-8 (Pacific)
  - Summer (DST): UTC-7 (PDT)
- ZIP code: 96103
- Area code: 530
- FIPS code: 06-30560
- GNIS feature IDs: 1659728, 2408311

Graeagle is a town and census-designated place in eastern Plumas County, California, United States, located along the Middle Fork Feather River in the Northern Sierra Nevada. The population was 724 as of 2020.

== History ==
The town was founded in 1916 as a lumber town. A post office was established in 1919 with the moniker of Davies Mill. When the mill changed ownership in the 1920s, a naming contest was held. Belle Byrne contracted the name of nearby Gray Eagle Creek to Graeagle, winning the contest and its $5 prize.

The name of the creek may have had some connection with Edward D Baker, the "Gray Eagle of Republicanism," who was in the mining region in 1856 while stumping the state for Frémont.

Graeagle Lumber Company was owned by the California Fruit Exchange which employed hundreds in logging, lumber production and the manufacturing of box shook (boxes for picking and shipping fruit and vegetables) from the 1920s to the 1950s. Modernization closed the mill in 1956 and the box factory in 1957. The town was acquired by the West family in 1959.

== Geography ==
According to the United States Census Bureau, the CDP has a total area of 11.1 square miles (29 km^{2}), of which 11.07 square miles (28.7 km^{2}) is land and 0.06 square miles (0.16 km^{2}) (0.51%) is water.

== Economy ==
Much of the economy is seasonal, catering to summer tourism, primarily second homes.

Several golf courses are in the area.

The brewery "The Brewing Lair of the Lost Sierra", is located in nearby Blairsden, as is the Plumas National Forest Beckwourth Ranger District headquarters.

About 6 miles (9.7 km) west of Graeagle is the Plumas-Eureka State Park which includes the local ghost towns where mining in began in 1851. As was common throughout this area of California, mining was initially done by individuals, then companies and finally by corporations whose owners often lived far away from the mines themselves. For the mines in the Graeagle area, investors were from as far away as London.

== Demographics ==
Historical population
Census	Pop.	Note	%±
2000	831		—
2010	737		−11.3%
2020	724		−1.8%
U.S. Decennial Census; 1860–1870 1880-1890; 1900 1910 1920; 1930 1940 1950; 1960 1970 1980; 1990 2000 2010

Graeagle first appeared as a census designated place in the 2000 U.S. census.

=== 2020 ===
Graeagle CDP, California – Racial and ethnic composition Note: the US Census treats Hispanic/Latino as an ethnic category. This table excludes Latinos from the racial categories and assigns them to a separate category. Hispanics/Latinos may be of any race.
Race / Ethnicity (NH = Non-Hispanic)	Pop 2000	Pop 2010	Pop 2020	% 2000	% 2010	% 2020
White alone (NH)	797	696	659	95.91%	94.44%	91.02%
Black or African American alone (NH)	0	1	3	0.00%	0.14%	0.41%
Native American or Alaska Native alone (NH)	4	5	5	0.48%	0.68%	0.69%
Asian alone (NH)	0	0	3	0.00%	0.00%	0.41%
Native Hawaiian or Pacific Islander alone (NH)	1	0	0	0.12%	0.00%	0.00%
Other race alone (NH)	1	0	8	0.12%	0.00%	1.10%
Mixed race or Multiracial (NH)	10	8	15	1.20%	1.09%	2.07%
Hispanic or Latino (any race)	18	27	31	2.17%	3.66%	4.28%
Total	831	737	724	100.00%	100.00%	100.00%

The 2020 United States census reported that Graeagle had a population of 724. The population density was 65.4 inhabitants per square mile (25.3/km^{2}). The racial makeup of Graeagle was 669 (92.4%) White, 3 (0.4%) African American, 5 (0.7%) Native American, 3 (0.4%) Asian, 0 (0.0%) Pacific Islander, 9 (1.2%) from other races, and 35 (4.8%) from two or more races. Hispanic or Latino of any race were 31 persons (4.3%).

The whole population lived in households. There were 390 households, out of which 27 (6.9%) had children under the age of 18 living in them, 215 (55.1%) were married-couple households, 16 (4.1%) were cohabiting couple households, 104 (26.7%) had a female householder with no partner present, and 55 (14.1%) had a male householder with no partner present. 129 households (33.1%) were one person, and 77 (19.7%) were one person aged 65 or older. The average household size was 1.86. There were 239 families (61.3% of all households).

The age distribution was 47 people (6.5%) under the age of 18, 23 people (3.2%) aged 18 to 24, 63 people (8.7%) aged 25 to 44, 229 people (31.6%) aged 45 to 64, and 362 people (50.0%) who were 65 years of age or older. The median age was 65.0 years. For every 100 females, there were 97.8 males.

There were 900 housing units at an average density of 81.3 units per square mile (31.4 units/km^{2}), of which 390 (43.3%) were occupied. Of these, 330 (84.6%) were owner-occupied, and 60 (15.4%) were occupied by renters.

=== 2010 ===
The 2010 United States census reported that Graeagle had a population of 737. The population density was 66.3 inhabitants per square mile (25.6/km^{2}). The racial makeup of Graeagle was 718 (97.4%) White, 1 (0.1%) African American, 5 (0.7%) Native American, 0 (0.0%) Asian, 0 (0.0%) Pacific Islander, 3 (0.4%) from other races, and 10 (1.4%) from two or more races. Hispanic or Latino of any race were 27 persons (3.7%).

The Census reported that 737 people (100% of the population) lived in households.

There were 392 households, out of which 41 (10.5%) had children under the age of 18 living in them, 217 (55.4%) were opposite-sex married couples living together, 20 (5.1%) had a female householder with no husband present, 10 (2.6%) had a male householder with no wife present. There were 17 (4.3%) unmarried opposite-sex partnerships, and 1 (0.3%) same-sex married couples or partnerships. 128 households (32.7%) were made up of individuals, and 85 (21.7%) had someone living alone who was 65 years of age or older. The average household size was 1.88. There were 247 families (63.0% of all households); the average family size was 2.30.

The population was spread out, with 70 people (9.5%) under the age of 18, 20 people (2.7%) aged 18 to 24, 61 people (8.3%) aged 25 to 44, 269 people (36.5%) aged 45 to 64, and 317 people (43.0%) who were 65 years of age or older. The median age was 62.4 years. For every 100 females, there were 94.5 males. For every 100 females age 18 and over, there were 94.5 males.

There were 904 housing units at an average density of 81.3 per square mile (31.4/km^{2}), of which 330 (84.2%) were owner-occupied, and 62 (15.8%) were occupied by renters. The homeowner vacancy rate was 6.8%; the rental vacancy rate was 28.1%. 603 people (81.8% of the population) lived in owner-occupied housing units and 134 people (18.2%) lived in rental housing units.

== Media ==
Formerly, the primary local news source was the Portola Reporter, published every Wednesday. Now it appears in online form only as the Plumas News.

== Government ==
In the California State Legislature, Graeagle is in the 1st senatorial district, represented by Republican Megan Dahle, and the 1st Assembly district, represented by Republican Heather Hadwick.

In the United States House of Representatives, Graeagle formerly was in California's 3rd congressional district, represented by Independent Kevin Kiley.

== Education ==
The school district is Plumas Unified School District.

== See also ==
- The Lost Sierra
