= Eureka Peak =

Mountain peak in California

- Location within California Location within the United States

Highest point
- Elevation: 7,448 ft (2,270 m)
- Prominence: 1,167 ft (356 m)
- Coordinates: 39°44′49.72″N 120°43′17.76″W

Geography
- Location: Plumas County, California, United States
- Parent range: Sierra Nevada
- Topo map: USGS Gold Lake

Eureka Peak is a 7,447-foot granite peak in the Northern Sierra Nevada in Plumas County, California in the United States.

Formerly known as Gold Mountain, it is located within the Plumas Eureka State Park.

Prospectors in search of the mystical Gold Lake discovered gold in a quartz outcrop on May 23, 1851, and gold mining continued until 1942.

The mine's tramway may have served as the world's first ski lift.
