= Clio Trestle =

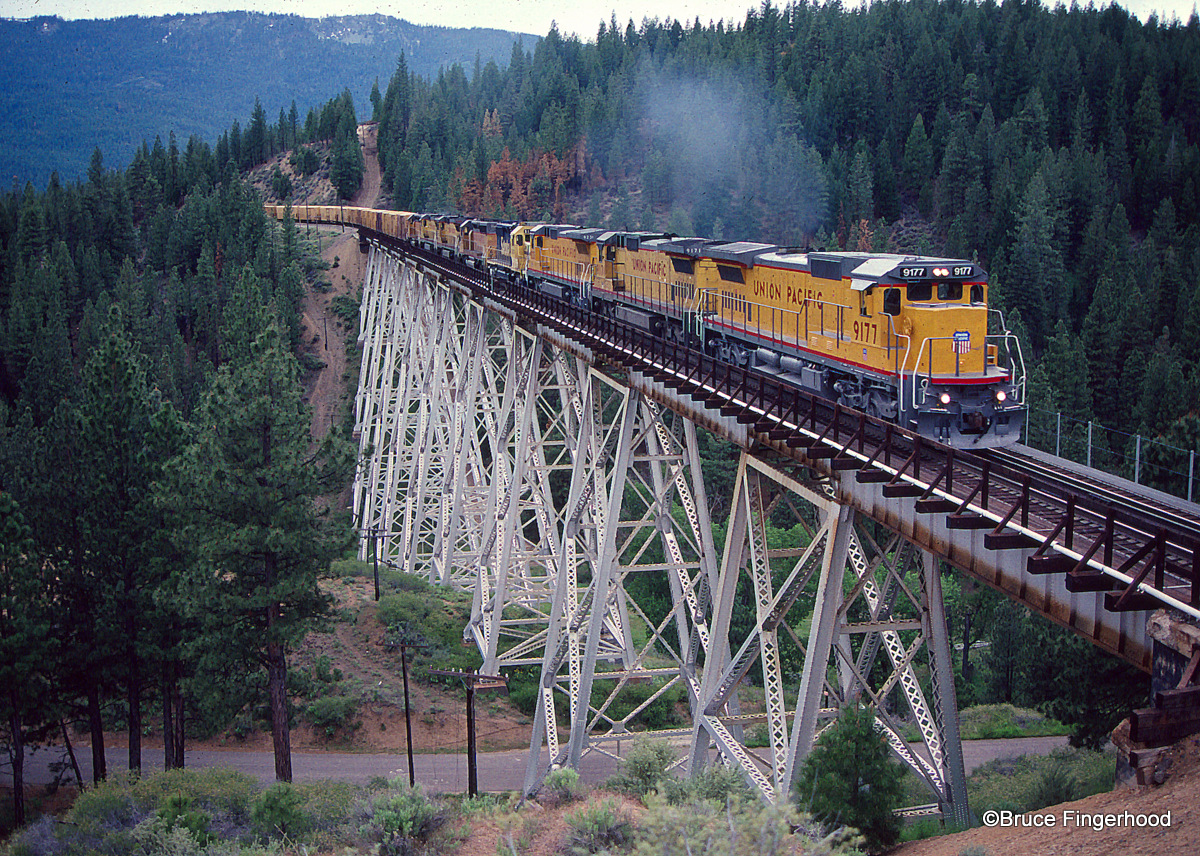
- A freight train on the trestle in 1994
- Coordinates: 39°45′13″N 120°34′03″W
- Carries: Canyon Subdivision (Feather River Route)
- Crosses: Willow Creek
- Locale: Clio, California
- Owner: Union Pacific Railway

Characteristics
- Total length: 1,005 ft (306 m)
- Height: 172 ft (52 m)

Rail characteristics
- No. of tracks: Single
- Track gauge: 4 ft 8 1/2 in (1,435 mm) standard gauge

History
- Constructed by: Western Pacific Railroad
- Opened: 1909

Location
- Interactive map of Clio Trestle

The Clio Trestle is a railroad trestle on the historic Feather River Route of the Union Pacific Railroad. It is located in the Sierra Nevada near Clio in Plumas County, California. The trestle is 172 feet (52 m) high and 1,005 feet (306 m) long.

== History ==
The Western Pacific Railroad (now part of the Union Pacific) built the Feather River Route across the Sierra Nevada in 1909 to complete a San Francisco Bay Area–Salt Lake City route, competing with the Southern Pacific Railroad's line over Donner Pass. While longer, the Feather River Route's highest elevation in the Sierra Nevada Mountains is at the Chilcoot Tunnel that travels under Beckwourth Pass which is at an elevation of only 5,000 feet (1,500 m), as opposed to the 7,000 feet (2,100 m) elevation of the Donner Pass route; also because the route holds a grade of no more than 1% along its entire length which makes costs of operation over the route very cost-effective. The Clio Trestle is the longest and tallest bridge along the route.

The Clio Trestle appears in the opening scene of the 1960 film Guns of the Timberland.

== Railfanning ==
The Clio Trestle is a favorite railfan spot and is part of the Plumas County and Western Pacific Railroad Museum's "7 Wonders of the Western Pacific Railroad World" exhibit and tour. History and railfan access are described in two travel guides. The trestle can be reached via Clio State Road 40A, either north 1.5 miles (2.4 km) from State Highway 89 at Clio, or south 3.7 miles (6.0 km) from State Highway 70.

== See also ==
- Western Pacific Railroad Museum — in Plumas County
- Keddie Wye
- Beckwourth Trail
- Beckwourth Pass
