= Plumas-Eureka State Park =

State park in California, United States

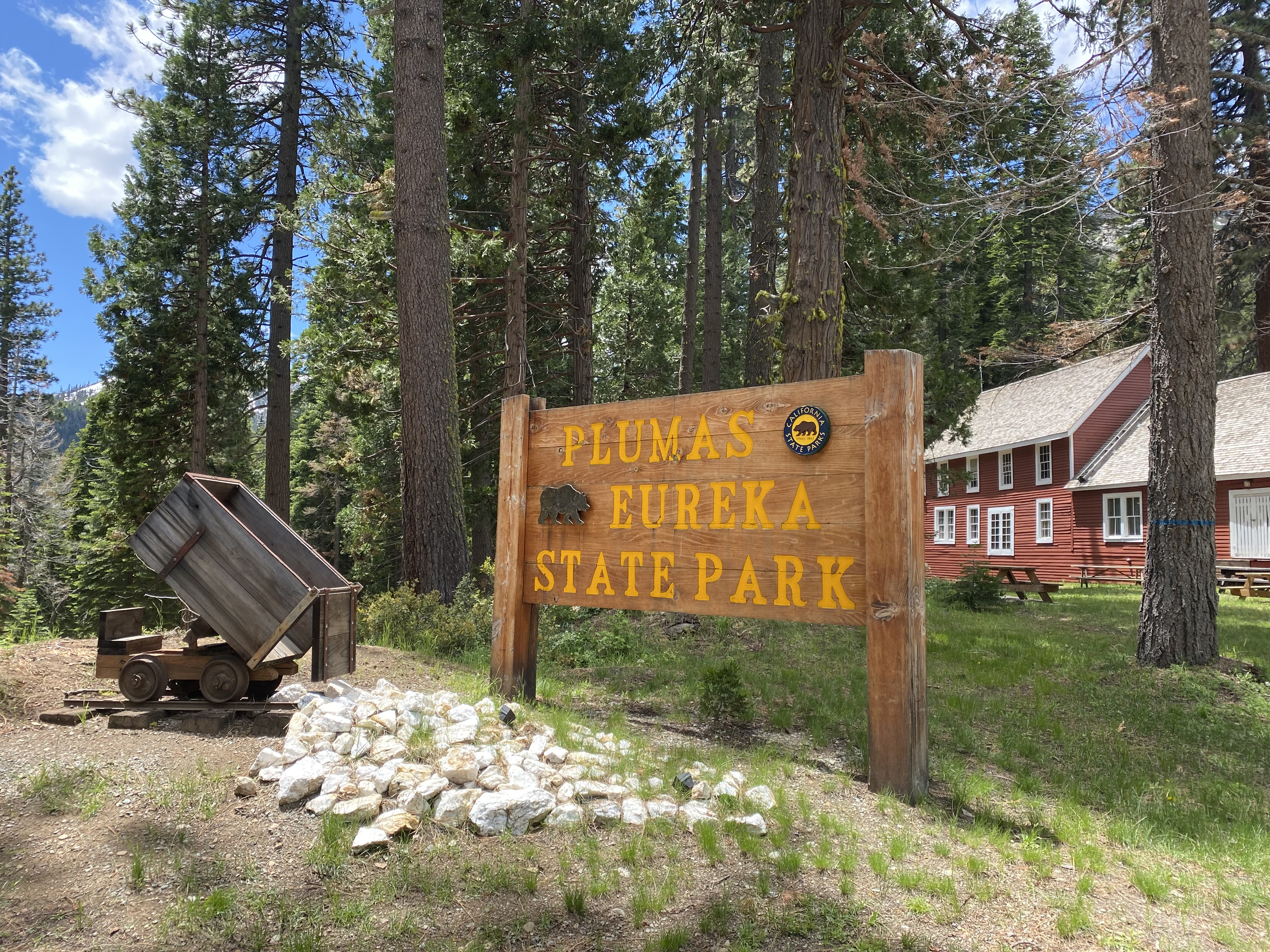

- Location within California Location within the United States
- Location: Plumas County, California
- Nearest city: Blairsden, California
- Coordinates: 39°45′40″N 120°42′24″W
- Governing body: State of California

California Historical Landmark
- Official name: Jamison City, Eureka Mills, Johnstown, and the famous Eureka Mine
- Reference no.: 196

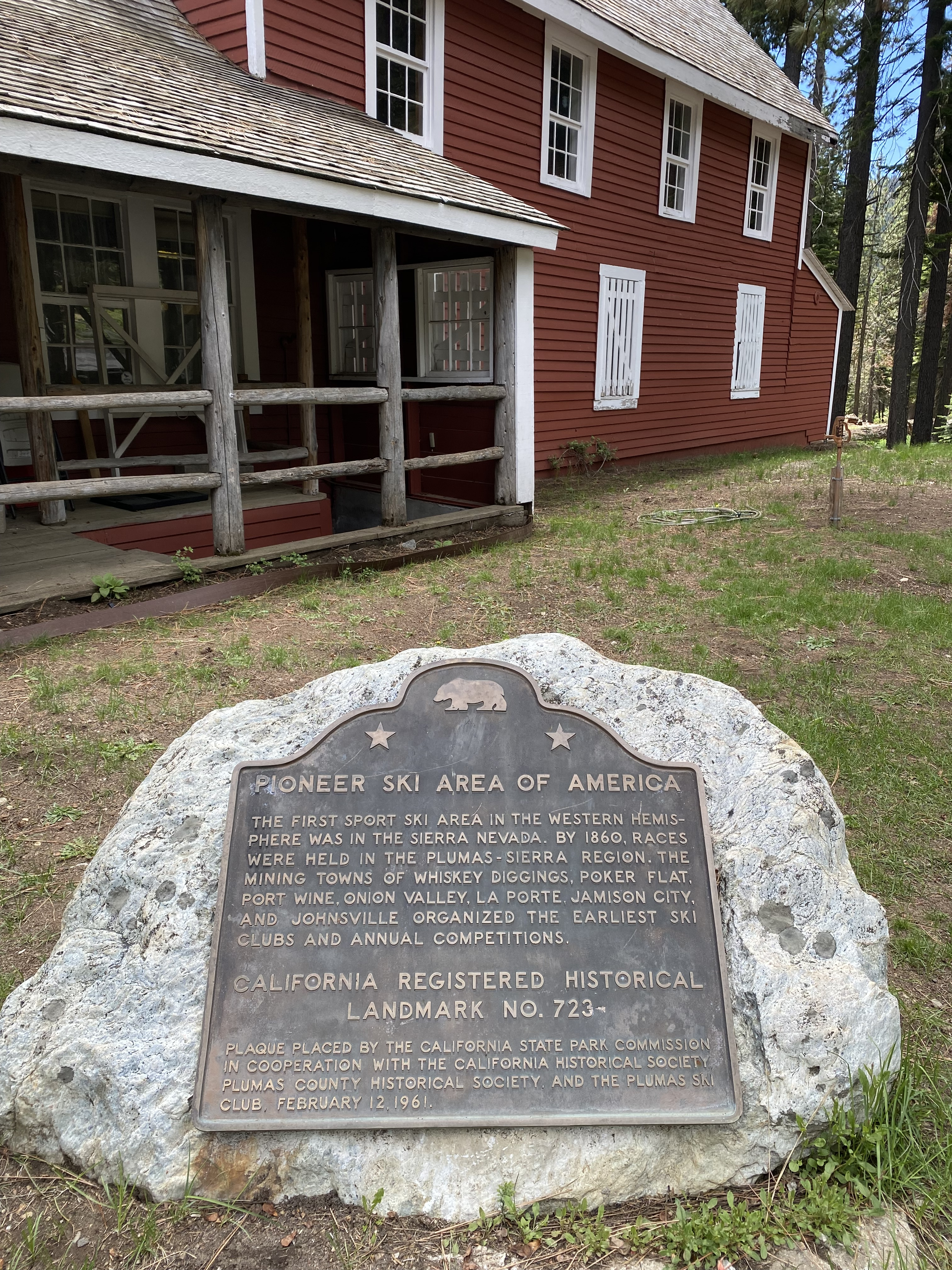
California Historical Landmark 723, Johnsville Ski Area, Plumas

Plumas-Eureka State Park is a California state park located in the Sierra Nevada and Cascade Range in Plumas County, California.

The park, as a mining museum, shows and protects the history of the active mid-19th-century California Gold Rush mining period. As a large natural area, it shows and protects the serenity of the mountain's meadows, forests, lakes, and granite peaks. Camping, picnicking, biking, fishing, and hiking are offered.

Eureka Peak, formerly Gold Mountain, was the site of some of the first organized ski races in North America. The National Longboard Championship, the longest running ski races since 1911, have been held in the Park at the Eureka Ski Bowl since 1993.

Gold Discovery Days is a living history weekend held in July within the park. The celebration features mining-era demonstrations and activities.

== Mining history ==
The historic mining area includes a museum in the miner's bunkhouse, the Mohawk Stamp Mill, Bushman five-stamp mill, stables, a blacksmith shop, the mine office, and a miner's home "Moriarity House".

A California Historical Landmark marker is located in the park honoring the mining areas of Jamison City, Eureka Mills, Johnstown, and the Eureka Mine.

== Natural history ==
Plumas-Eureka State Park is in the Sierra Nevada Coniferous Forest ecosystem of the Temperate Coniferous Forests Biome.

The park's animals include golden eagles, porcupines, black bear, deer, weasel, mink, marten, mountain lion, bobcat, fox, and many others.

The park is within the Middle Fork Feather River watershed and encompasses some of its headwaters, including Jamison and Eureka Creeks.

== Access ==
Plumas-Eureka State Park is located about 60 miles (97 km) north of Lake Tahoe in Northern California. It is 5 miles (8 km) west of Blairsden on County Road A-14.

=== Proposed closure ===
This is one of the 48 California state parks that was proposed for closure in January 2008 by California's Governor Arnold Schwarzenegger as part of a deficit reduction program since rescinded following public outcry. Plumas-Eureka State Park is open to the public, except during the winter season.

== See also ==
- List of California state parks
- Protected areas of the Sierra Nevada
- The Lost Sierra
- Johnsville
- Pioneer Ski Area of America California Historical Landmark at Palisades Tahoe Aerial Tram
