= Little Grass Valley Reservoir =

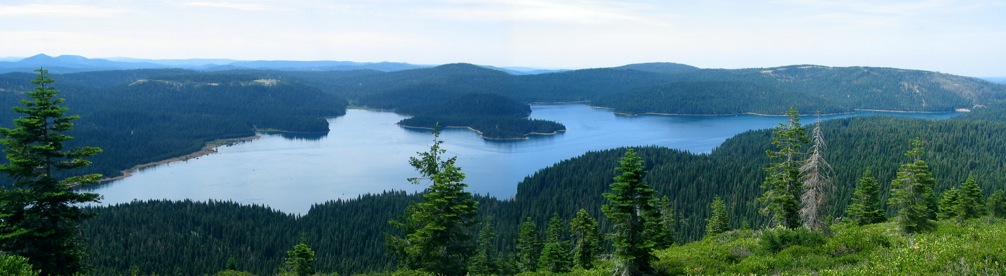
- The reservoir in 2004, viewed from Bald Mountain.

- Location within California
- Location: Plumas County, California
- Coordinates: 39°43′45″N 120°59′25″W
- Type: reservoir
- Primary inflows: South Fork Feather River, Black Rock Creek, Ice Creek, Pancake Ravine, Kenzie Ravine
- Primary outflows: South Fork Feather River
- Catchment area: 25.9 square miles (67 km^{2})
- Basin countries: United States
- Max. length: 2 miles (3.2 km)
- Max. width: 1 mile (1.6 km)
- Surface area: 1,433 acres (580 ha)
- Average depth: 65 feet (20 m)
- Water volume: 93,010 acre-feet (114,730,000 m^{3})
- Shore length^{1}: 14.5 miles (23.3 km)
- Surface elevation: 5,036 feet (1,535 m)
- ^{1} Shore length is not a well-defined measure.

Little Grass Valley Reservoir is an artificial lake in Plumas County, California and Plumas National Forest near the Pacific Crest Trail.

The lake's waters are impounded by Little Grass Valley Dam (National ID CA00269), which was completed in 1961 (65 years ago).

== Hydrology ==
The lake discharges into the South Fork Feather River.

== Little Grass Valley Dam ==
Little Grass Valley Dam
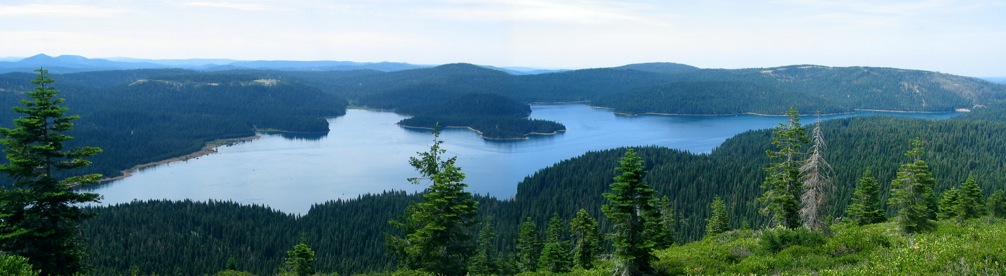
- Interactive map of Little Grass Valley Dam
- Country: United States
- Location: Plumas County, California
- Coordinates: 39°43′18″N 121°01′22″W
- Opening date: 1961
- Owners: South Feather Water and Power Agency

Dam and spillways
- Type of dam: Rockfill
- Impounds: South Fork Feather River
- Height: 210 feet (64 m)
- Length: 840 feet (260 m)
- Elevation at crest: 5,052 feet (1,540 m)
- Width (crest): 30 feet (9.1 m)
- Dam volume: 834,000 cubic yards (638,000 m^{3})

Reservoir
- Creates: Little Grass Valley Reservoir
- Total capacity: 93,010 acre-feet (114,730,000 m^{3})
- Catchment area: 25.9 square miles (67 km^{2})
- Maximum length: 2 miles (3.2 km)
- Maximum width: 1 mile (1.6 km)

Little Grass Valley Dam is a rock-fill dam 840 feet (260 m) long and 210 feet (64 m) high, with 18 feet (5.5 m) of freeboard. The South Feather Water and Power Agency owns the dam.

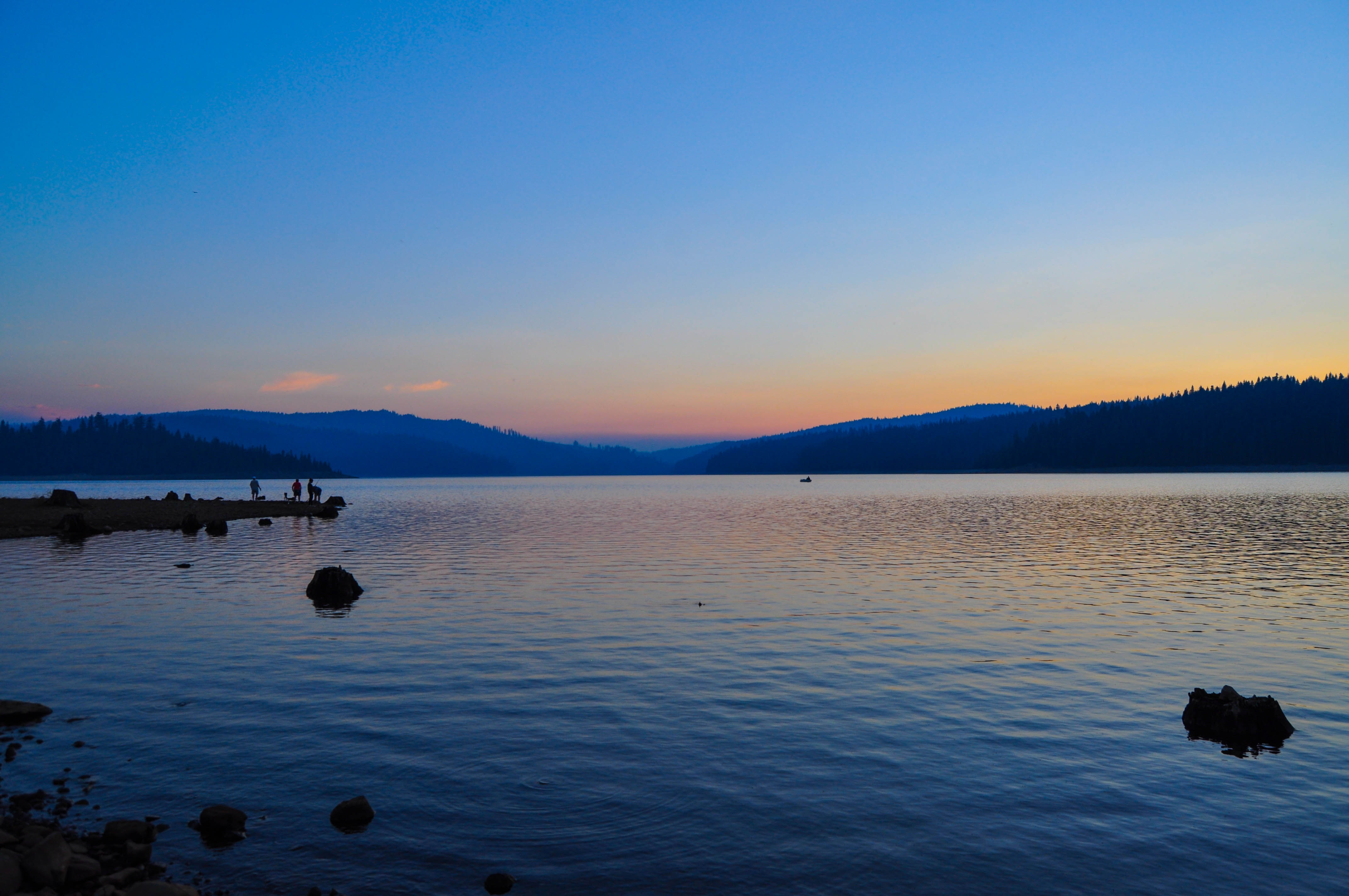
Lake

== Recreation ==
Located in Plumas National Forest near the Pacific Crest Trail, Little Grass Valley Reservoir is the centerpiece of the Little Grass Valley Recreation Area, managed by the Feather River Ranger District. The area supports boating, camping, fishing, swimming, picnicking, horseback riding, mountain biking, wildlife viewing, and hiking.

== Access ==
By car, the lake is about ninety minutes from Yuba City. The Pacific Crest Trail passes north of the lake and can be reached by way of the Bald Mountain Trail from Horse Camp.

== See also ==
- List of dams and reservoirs in California
- List of lakes in California
- Grass valley
- Grass Valley, California
