= Clio, California =

Clio
- Unincorporated Community; Census Designated Place
- Location in Plumas County and the state of California

- Location in the United States
- Coordinates: 39°44′42″N 120°34′17″W
- Country: United States
- State: California
- County: Plumas

Area
  - Total: 0.58 sq mi (1.51 km^{2})
  - Land: 0.58 sq mi (1.51 km^{2})
  - Water: 0 sq mi (0.00 km^{2}) 0%
- Elevation: 4,416 ft (1,346 m)

Population (2020)
  - Total: 77
  - Density: 131.6/sq mi (50.83/km^{2})
- Time zone: UTC-8 (Pacific (PST))
  - Summer (DST): UTC-7 (PDT)
- ZIP code: 96106
- Area code: 530
- FIPS code: 06-14106
- GNIS feature ID: 1655907; 2407637

Clio (formerly, Wash) is a census-designated place in Plumas County, California, United States. Clio is located 23 miles (37.0 km) southeast of Quincy. The population was 77 at the 2020 census, up from 66 at the 2010 census.

== Toponymy ==
The original name was Wash; a post office with that name was opened in 1875.

In 1905, according to local folklore, prominent citizens decided that the name "Wash" was too often mistaken for the town of Washington, in Nevada County on the south fork of the Yuba River. As suggested by Postmaster Fred King, it was decided the new name of their community should be Clio, the trade name prominently cast into the door of the heating stove they were looking at.

== Geography ==
Clio is located at 39°44′42″N 120°34′17″W (39.745044, -120.571412).

According to the United States Census Bureau, the CDP has a total area of 0.6 square miles (1.6 km^{2}), all land.

== Demographics ==
Historical population
Census	Pop.	Note	%±
2000	90		—
2010	66		−26.7%
2020	77		16.7%
U.S. Decennial Census; 1850–1870 1880-1890; 1900 1910 1920; 1930 1940 1950; 1960 1970 1980; 1990 2000 2010

Clio first appeared as a census designated place in the 2000 U.S. census.

=== Racial and ethnic composition ===
Clio CDP, California – Racial and ethnic composition Note: the US Census treats Hispanic/Latino as an ethnic category. This table excludes Latinos from the racial categories and assigns them to a separate category. Hispanics/Latinos may be of any race.
Race / Ethnicity (NH = Non-Hispanic)	Pop 2000	Pop 2010	Pop 2020	% 2000	% 2010	% 2020
White alone (NH)	360	551	422	93.02%	81.27%	78.73%
Black or African American alone (NH)	1	14	8	0.26%	2.06%	1.49%
Native American or Alaska Native alone (NH)	2	28	8	0.52%	4.13%	1.49%
Asian alone (NH)	0	3	4	0.00%	0.44%	0.75%
Native Hawaiian or Pacific Islander alone (NH)	2	1	1	0.52%	0.15%	0.19%
Other race alone (NH)	0	0	2	0.00%	0.00%	0.37%
Mixed race or Multiracial (NH)	2	26	54	0.52%	3.83%	10.07%
Hispanic or Latino (any race)	20	55	37	5.17%	8.11%	6.90%
Total	387	678	536	100.00%	100.00%	100.00%

=== 2020 census ===
As of the 2020 census, Clio had a population of 77. The median age was 65.6 years. 16.9% of residents were under the age of 18 and 53.2% of residents were 65 years of age or older. For every 100 females there were 97.4 males, and for every 100 females age 18 and over there were 100.0 males age 18 and over.

0.0% of residents lived in urban areas, while 100.0% lived in rural areas.

There were 48 households in Clio, of which 35.4% had children under the age of 18 living in them. Of all households, 43.8% were married-couple households, 20.8% were households with a male householder and no spouse or partner present, and 33.3% were households with a female householder and no spouse or partner present. About 22.9% of all households were made up of individuals and 10.5% had someone living alone who was 65 years of age or older.

There were 57 housing units, of which 15.8% were vacant. The homeowner vacancy rate was 0.0% and the rental vacancy rate was 0.0%.

=== 2010 census ===
The 2010 United States census reported that Clio had a population of 66. The population density was 114.7 inhabitants per square mile (44.3/km^{2}). The racial makeup of Clio was 64 (97.0%) White, 0 (0.0%) African American, 0 (0.0%) Native American, 0 (0.0%) Asian, 1 (1.5%) Pacific Islander, 1 (1.5%) from other races, and 0 (0.0%) from two or more races. Hispanic or Latino of any race were 1 persons (1.5%).

The Census reported that 66 people (100% of the population) lived in households, 0 (0%) lived in non-institutionalized group quarters, and 0 (0%) were institutionalized.

There were 39 households, out of which 4 (10.3%) had children under the age of 18 living in them, 14 (35.9%) were opposite-sex married couples living together, 2 (5.1%) had a female householder with no husband present, 0 (0%) had a male householder with no wife present. There were 0 (0%) unmarried opposite-sex partnerships, and 1 (2.6%) same-sex married couples or partnerships. 21 households (53.8%) were made up of individuals, and 10 (25.6%) had someone living alone who was 65 years of age or older. The average household size was 1.69. There were 16 families (41.0% of all households); the average family size was 2.56.

The population was spread out, with 7 people (10.6%) under the age of 18, 3 people (4.5%) aged 18 to 24, 7 people (10.6%) aged 25 to 44, 31 people (47.0%) aged 45 to 64, and 18 people (27.3%) who were 65 years of age or older. The median age was 56.0 years. For every 100 females, there were 94.1 males. For every 100 females age 18 and over, there were 90.3 males.

There were 60 housing units at an average density of 104.2 per square mile (40.2/km^{2}), of which 33 (84.6%) were owner-occupied, and 6 (15.4%) were occupied by renters. The homeowner vacancy rate was 8.3%; the rental vacancy rate was 0%. 60 people (90.9% of the population) lived in owner-occupied housing units and 6 people (9.1%) lived in rental housing units.

=== 2000 census ===
As of the census of 2000, there were 90 people, 39 households, and 26 families residing in the CDP. The population density was 151.5 inhabitants per square mile (58.5/km^{2}). There were 60 housing units at an average density of 101.0 per square mile (39.0/km^{2}). The racial makeup of the CDP was 98.89% White, and 1.11% from two or more races. 3.33% of the population were Hispanic or Latino of any race.

There were 39 households, out of which 30.8% had children under the age of 18 living with them, 56.4% were married couples living together, 7.7% had a female householder with no husband present, and 33.3% were non-families. 28.2% of all households were made up of individuals, and 15.4% had someone living alone who was 65 years of age or older. The average household size was 2.31 and the average family size was 2.81.

In the CDP, the population was spread out, with 23.3% under the age of 18, 3.3% from 18 to 24, 18.9% from 25 to 44, 27.8% from 45 to 64, and 26.7% who were 65 years of age or older. The median age was 47 years. For every 100 females, there were 100 males. For every 100 females age 18 and over, there were 91.7 males.

The median income for a household in the CDP was $23,036, and the median income for a family was $42,917. Males had a median income of $11,250 versus $0 for females. The per capita income for the CDP was $14,560. None of the population and none of the families were below the poverty line.

== Politics ==
In the state legislature, Clio is in the 1st senatorial district, represented by Republican Megan Dahle, and the 1st Assembly district, represented by Republican Heather Hadwick.

Federally, Clio is in California's 3rd congressional district, represented by Independent Kevin Kiley.

== Education ==
The school district is Plumas Unified School District.

== See also ==
- Clio trestle
