= Lake Davis =

- Location within California Location within the United States
- Location: Plumas County, California
- Coordinates: 39°54′45″N 120°30′38″W
- Type: reservoir
- Primary inflows: Big Grizzly Creek, Freeman Creek, Cow Creek, Dan Blough Creek
- Primary outflows: Big Grizzly Creek
- Catchment area: 44 square miles (110 km^{2})
- Basin countries: United States
- Max. length: 5 miles (8.0 km)
- Max. width: 2 miles (3.2 km)
- Surface area: 4,026 acres (1,629 ha)
- Average depth: 21 feet (6.4 m)
- Water volume: 83,000 acre-feet (102,000,000 m^{3})
- Surface elevation: 5,777 feet (1,761 m)

Lake Davis is an artificial lake in Plumas County, California near the Sierra Nevada community of Portola. Its waters are impounded by Grizzly Valley Dam, which was completed in 1966 (60 years ago) as part of the California State Water Project. The lake is named for Lester T. Davis (1906–1952).

== Hydrology ==
The lake discharges into Big Grizzly Creek, a tributary of the Middle Fork Feather River.

== Grizzly Valley Dam ==
Grizzly Valley Dam
- Interactive map of Grizzly Valley Dam
- Country: United States
- Location: Plumas County, California
- Coordinates: 39°52′54″N 120°28′34″W
- Purpose: California State Water Project
- Opening date: 1966
- Owners: State of California, managed by California Department of Water Resources

Dam and spillways
- Type of dam: Earth and rock
- Impounds: Big Grizzly Creek
- Height: 115 feet (35 m)
- Length: 800 feet (240 m)
- Elevation at crest: 5,785 feet (1,763 m)
- Width (crest): 30 feet (9.1 m)
- Dam volume: 253,000 cubic yards (193,000 m^{3})

Reservoir
- Creates: Lake Davis
- Total capacity: 83,000 acre-feet (102,000,000 m^{3})
- Catchment area: 44 square miles (110 km^{2})
- Maximum length: 5 miles (8.0 km)
- Maximum width: 2 miles (3.2 km)

Grizzly Valley Dam is an earth-and-rock dam 800 feet (240 m) long and 115 feet (35 m) high, with 10 feet (3.0 m) of freeboard. The California Department of Water Resources manages the dam.

== Recreation ==
Located in Plumas National Forest, Lake Davis is the centerpiece of the Lake Davis Recreation Area, which supports boating, campground camping, cross-country skiing, fishing, hunting, mountain biking, picnicking, snowmobiling, swimming, and wildlife viewing.

== Northern pike ==
During 1996-97 Lake Davis was in the national spotlight due to controversy over northern pike and the possibility of poisoning the lake. Following an explosion of the pike population, the California Department of Fish and Game (DFG) decided to treat the reservoir with rotenone, a naturally occurring poison deadly to gilled creatures.

After the first attempt failed to eradicate the pike and the population rebounded, the DFG again utilized rotenone in September 2007, after lowering the water level. DFG's justification for the action was their concern that pike might escape the lake and enter the Sacramento River system, potentially harming native anadromous fish species such as steelhead and salmon. The effort was controversial because pike are popular gamefish and considerable effort had already been spent on unsuccessful attempts to rid the lake of pike using explosives, nets, shocking, and poison.

Since the 2007 treatment, there have been no confirmed cases of northern pike in the lake.

== See also ==
- List of dams and reservoirs in California
- List of lakes in California
