= Middle Fork Feather River =

Middle Fork Feather River El Rio de las Plumas
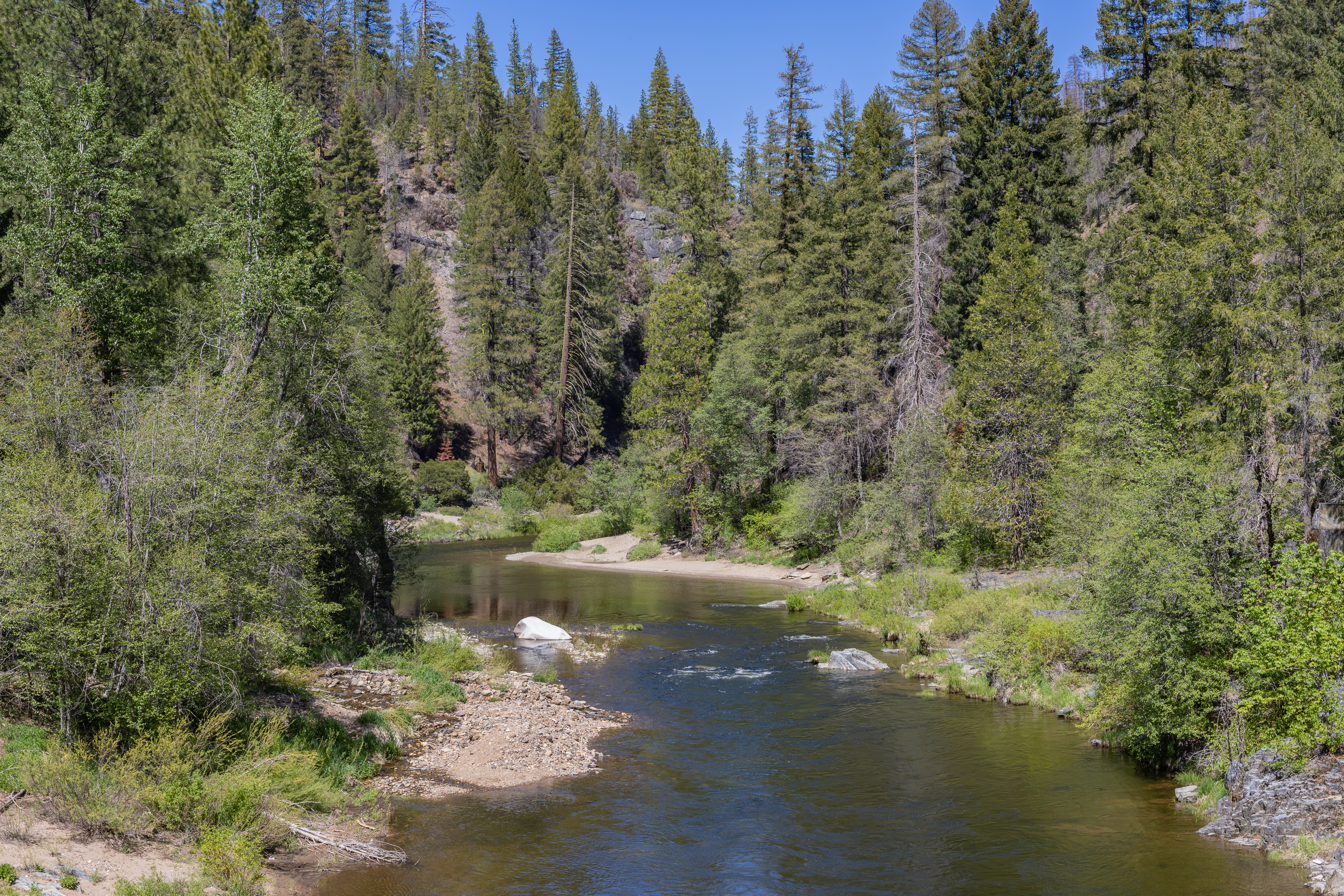
- The Middle Fork near Red Bridge Campground, May 2022

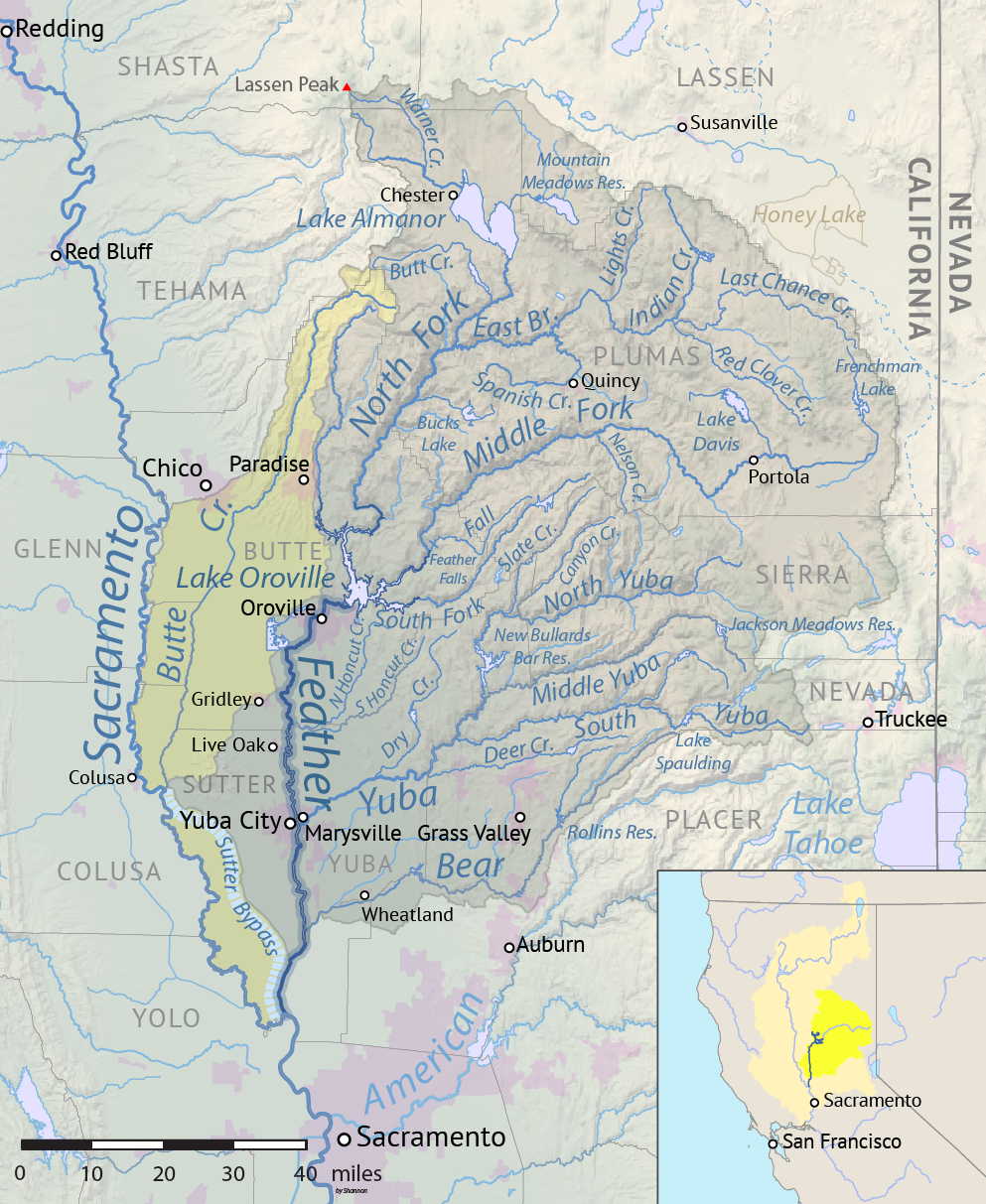
- Map of the Feather River watershed including the Middle Fork Feather
- Etymology: "Plumas" means "feather" in Spanish

Location
- Country: United States
- State: California
- Region: Sierra Nevada
- Cities: Beckwourth, Portola, Cromberg, Graeagle

Physical characteristics
- Source: Near Beckwourth
  - location: Sierra Valley, Plumas County
  - coordinates: 39°48′49″N 120°22′46″W
  - elevation: 4,872 ft (1,485 m)
- Mouth: Lake Oroville
  - location: About 10 miles (16 km) northeast of Oroville, Butte County
  - coordinates: 39°38′29″N 121°17′11″W
  - elevation: 928 ft (283 m)
- Length: 98 mi (158 km), East-west
- Basin size: 1,062 sq mi (2,750 km^{2})
- Discharge
  - location: Merrimac
  - average: 1,489.5 cu ft/s (42.18 m^{3}/s)
  - maximum: 86,200 cu ft/s (2,440 m^{3}/s)

Basin features
- River system: Feather River watershed
- Tributaries
  - left: Sulphur Creek, Frazier Creek, Gray Eagle Creek, Jamison Creek, Nelson Creek, Onion Valley Creek, South Branch Middle Fork Feather River, Fall River
  - right: Little Last Chance Creek, Big Grizzly Creek, Bear Creek, North Fork Middle Fork Feather River

The Middle Fork Feather River is a major river in Plumas and Butte Counties in the U.S. state of California. Nearly 100 miles (160 km) long, it drains about 1,062 square miles (2,750 km^{2}) of the rugged northern Sierra Nevada range.

== Geography ==
Its headwaters are located near Beckwourth in the largest alpine basin in the Sierra Nevada, the Sierra Valley. The convergence of several streams there creates the Sierra Valley Channels, the largest of which is Little Last Chance Creek, flowing out of Frenchman Lake across the northeast side of the valley. Flowing west, it is joined by Big Grizzly Creek, with waters from Lake Davis. The river continues west, passing Portola and turning northwest at Clio, where it is joined by Sulphur Creek. In the area of Graeagle, It is joined by Frazier Creek, flowing out of Gold Lake, then Gray Eagle Creek, flowing out of Long Lake.

After flowing through the Mohawk Valley, it then turns westwards into a canyon. Jamison Creek and Nelson Creek enter from the left, then Onion Valley Creek a few miles onward. Bear Creek, Willow Creek and the North Fork Middle Fork Feather River all come in from the right as the river courses west-southwest through a tight, steep canyon strewn with rapids. It is then joined by the South Branch Middle Fork Feather River from the left. As the river widens into an arm of Lake Oroville, a reservoir formed by the Oroville Dam, the Fall River joins from the left. The reservoir is fed by the North, Middle, West and South Forks of the Feather River, which once joined in the valley to form the main Feather River. That river continues southwards to join the Sacramento River near the unincorporated community of Plumas Landing.

One of the Middle Fork Feather's tributaries, the Fall River, feeds the Feather Falls.

== Wild and Scenic River ==
The Middle Fork is recognized by the US Government and designated as a National Wild and Scenic River for 77.6 miles of its length.

== Grizzly Valley ==
The Grizzly Valley is a 21 sq mi (54 km^{2}) landform of the upper Middle Fork Feather watershed that receives 29-37 inches of annual precipitation. The valley is the location of Lake Davis, an impoundment of Big Grizzly Creek by the 1967 Grizzly Valley Dam.
