= Plumas County Museum =

County Museum in Quincy California, United States

- Established: 1971
- Location: Quincy, California
- Coordinates: 39.9356°N 120.9477°W
- Type: History museum
- Director: Scott Lawson
- Website: plumasmuseum.org

The Plumas County Museum is a 501(c)3 organization and historical museum located in Quincy, California. Exhibits focus on Plumas County, including the Maidu people, the California Gold Rush, the logging industry, and the local community.

In addition to artifacts on display, the museum houses an archive of over 5,000 photographs, as well as documents, and a 1,000-item map collection.

The museum is owned and managed by an association, which also owns and maintains the 1878 Variel Home as well as the 1859 Goodwin Law Office, the oldest continually used law office in the state of California.

== History ==
The museum was endowed by the estate of Stella Fay Miller of Quincy, California.

== See also ==
- California Historical Landmarks in Plumas County
- Quincy Pioneer Grave
- American Ranch and Hotel
- Elizabethtown
- Pioneer Schoolhouse
- Plumas House
- Rich Bar
