= James Haun =

- Born: June 24, 1811; Scott County, Kentucky, U.S.
- Died: June 20, 1890 (aged 78); Quincy, California, U.S.
- Spouse: Martha Hurst (m. 1831)
- Children: 1
- Relatives: Henry P. Haun

James Humphrey Haun (1811–1890) was a gold miner, farmer and diarist. He left five volumes of diaries chronicling the California Gold Rush and its aftermath, from 1853 to 1959. His records are stored at the Plumas County Museum in Quincy, California

== Early life ==
James Haun was born near Haun's Mill near Lexington in Scott County, Kentucky to John Haun and Katherine Winter. He had four younger brothers, and at least one sister. The family business was milling.

== Personal life ==
In 1831, Haun married Martha Hurst of Georgetown, and the couple had one son, John, born in 1834. They were active in the local Baptist church, and had many friends. Financially, the family was moderately successful, with a home and business.

== Career ==
In 1853, Haun set out for the gold mines of California in company with his seventeen-year-old son John and his younger brother Dave, with the goal of earning enough to purchase agricultural property at home. He prospected on Willow Creek near Nelson Point on the Middle Fork of the Feather River as a member of several different mining companies. Although he never struck it rich, his claims paid well. In November 1855, he was joined by his wife and her young niece Lizzie, and in 1856 purchased the 160 acre American Ranch in Quincy, which the family operated as a farm and hotel until its sale in 1876.

He was an active member of the Plumas Rangers and local Democratic organizations.

== Death ==
He died at the age of 78 at home in Quincy.
