= List of reporting marks: Q =

Note: Marks ending in U are for container owners; marks ending in X are not common carriers; marks ending in Z are for trailers without flanged wheels. All other marks are of common-carrier railroads.

== Q ==
- QC - Quebec Central Railway
- QCCX - Quantum Chemical Corporation
- QGRY - Quebec Gatineau Railway
- QNSX - Rail Enterprises Inc. (Doing Business As: Quebec North Shore and Labrador Railway on behalf of Iron Ore Company of Canada)
- QOCX - GE Rail Services
- QOHX - Quaker Oats Company
- QOTX - Quaker Oats Company (Chemicals Division)
- QRR - Quincy Railroad
- QSMX - Quaker State Oil Refining Corporation
- QSOX - Quaker State Oil Refining Corporation
- QTTX - TTX Corporation
