= Silongkoyo, California =

Silongkoyo
- Former settlement
- Location in California
- Coordinates: 39°56′12″N 120°56′44″W
- Country: United States
- State: California
- County: Plumas County
- Elevation: 3,435 ft (1,047 m)

Silongkoyo is a former Maidu village in Plumas County, California. It lay at an elevation of 3435 feet (1047 m). The site now lies within Quincy.
