= List of shipwrecks in December 1879 =

The list of shipwrecks in December 1879 includes ships sunk, foundered, grounded, or otherwise lost during December 1879.

== 1 December ==
List of shipwrecks: 1 December 1879
Ship	State	Description
Ann Essen	Germany	The ship was wrecked at Dedeağaç, Ottoman Empire.
Barracouta	United Kingdom	The ship was driven ashore at Dungeness, Kent. She was on a voyage from Antofagasta, Chile to the River Tyne. She was refloated and resumed her voyage.
Brilliant	United Kingdom	The lugger collided with the lugger Rowena (United Kingdom and sank at Great Yarmouth, Norfolk. Her crew were rescued.
Freden	Norway	The schooner foundered in the North Sea. Her crew were rescued by the sloop Scandinavia (Denmark).
Joseph Ferens	United Kingdom	The steamship departed from South Shields, County Durham for Lisbon, Portugal. No further trace, reported overdue, feared to have foundered in the Bay of Biscay with the loss of all 25 crew.
Kate Helena	United Kingdom	The ship was wrecked at Cape Cillar, Chile. She was on a voyage from Swansea, Glamorgan to Coquimbo, Chile.
Llanedarne	United Kingdom	The steamship departed from Gibraltar for Cardiff, Glamorgan. No further trace, presumed foundered in the Bay of Biscay with the loss of all hands.
Meridian	United Kingdom	The ship was driven ashore at Dungeness. She was refloated with the assistance of a tug and put in to The Down.
Onward	United Kingdom	The full-rigged ship ran aground on the Ower Sandbank, in the North Sea. Her sixteen crew were rescued by the Palling Lifeboat. She was on a voyage from Hartlepool, County Durham to the East Indies. She was refloated and taken in to Great Yarmouth.
Saucy Jack	United Kingdom	The smack was driven ashore and wrecked at Great Yarmouth. Her crew were rescued by rocket apparatus.
Scheme	United Kingdom	The smack collided with the smack Waterwitch and was beached at Great Yarmouth.
Tokatea	New South Wales	The barque was wrecked on Wollstock Island. Her eighteen crew took to three boats and reached Tahiti. She was on a voyage from Sydney to Honolulu, Hawaii.
Vera Cruz	Austria-Hungary	The barque collided with Cavaliere Squardelli (United Kingdom) and foundered off Cape Finisterre, Spain. Her crew were rescued by Cavaliere Squardelli. Vera Cruz was on a voyage from Trieste to Bordeaux, Gironde, France.
Wensleydale	United Kingdom	The schooner was run into by the steamship Nina (United Kingdom) in the River Wear and was severely damaged . Wensleydale put back to Sunderland, County Durham.
Wyvern	United Kingdom	The steamship ran aground on the Pauillac Bank, in the Gironde.

== 2 December ==
List of shipwrecks: 2 December 1879
Ship	State	Description
Averill	United Kingdom	The steamship was driven ashore at West Hartlepool, County Durham. She was on a voyage from West Hartlepool to East Hartlepool.
Borussia	United Kingdom	The steamship sprang a leak and foundered west of Faial Island, Azores with the loss of 160 of the 186 people on board. Ten survivors were rescued by Mallowdale (United Kingdom), five by the barque Fulda (Germany and eleven by Giacomino (Italy). Borussia was on a voyage from Liverpool, Lancashire to New Orleans, Louisiana, United States via A Coruña, Galicia, Spain and Havana, Cuba.
Teaser	United Kingdom	The fishing smack ran aground off Yarmouth, Isle of Wight.
Tynedale	United Kingdom	The steamship ran aground in the River Usk. She was on a voyage from Bilbao, Spain to Newport, Monmouthshire. She was refloated and resumed her voyage.
Viking	United Kingdom	The steamship ran aground at Sunderland, County Durham and was severely damaged. She was on a voyage from Hartlepool to Sunderland. She was refloated and taken in to Sunderland.
William Dawson	United Kingdom	The steamship collided with the steamship Frey (Norway) and sank in the River Tees. Her crew were rescued by Frey. William Dawson was on a voyage from Caen, Calvados, France to Middlesbrough, Yorkshire.

== 3 December ==
List of shipwrecks: 3 December 1879
Ship	State	Description
Echo	United Kingdom	The schooner struck the Harry Furlongs Rocks, Anglesey and sank. Her crew were rescued. She was on a voyage from Liverpool, Lancashire to Wicklow.
Ethiopia, and Holly	United Kingdom	The steamships collided in the Clyde and were both severely damaged.
Frank	United Kingdom	The ship was driven ashore at Hamilton, Bermuda. She was on a voyage from London to Hamilton.
Karebock	Denmark	The schooner ran aground on the Haisborough Sands, Norfolk, United Kingdom. She was on a voyage from London, United Kingdom to Helsingør. She was refloated and towed in to Lowestoft, Suffolk, United Kingdom in a leaky condition.
M. A. Baston	United States	The fishing schooner went ashore on Plum Island and sank. Her crew got off on their own.
Maggie	United Kingdom	The brig foundered in the Atlantic Ocean. Her crew were rescued by the full-rigged ship Charles Luling (Germany). Maggie was on a voyage from Charleston, South Carolina, United States to Aberdeen.
N. J. Pallisen	Denmark	The steamship ran aground in the River Barrow. She was on a voyage from Copenhagen to New Ross, County Wexford, United Kingdom. She was refloated.
St. Louis	France	The fishing vessel was run down and sunk in the English Channel 30 nautical miles (56 km) off Beachy Head, Sussex, United Kingdom by the barque Marina Rocca (Italy) with the loss of two of her seven crew. Survivors were rescued by Marina Rocca.
Vesta	Denmark	The ship was abandoned at in the North Sea. Her crew were rescued by the steamship Lillie (United Kingdom). Vesta was on a voyage from Middlesbrough, Yorkshire, United Kingdom to Svendborg.

== 4 December ==
List of shipwrecks: 4 December 1879
Ship	State	Description
Avalon	United Kingdom	The ship departed from Pernambuco, Brazil for the Newfoundland Colony. No further trace,. reported missing.
Balmoral	United Kingdom	The steamship ran aground in the Clyde. She was refloated.
Capella	United Kingdom	The steamship was abandoned off "Corrobedo", Spain. Her crew were rescued. She was on a voyage from Alexandria, Egypt to Hull, Yorkshire.
Cunley	United Kingdom	The schooner was driven ashore and wrecked at Querqueville, Manche, France with the loss of four of her crew.
Edith Hough	United Kingdom	The steamship was driven ashore near Rhyl, Denbighshire. She was on a voyage from Valencia, Spain to Liverpool, Lancashire. She was refloated and towed in to Liverpool by the tugs Commodore and Great Britain (both United Kingdom).
Emily	United Kingdom	The schooner ran aground at Cherbourg, Manche with the loss of all hands. She was on a voyage from Ipswich, Suffolk to Cherbourg.
Hawk	United Kingdom	The steamship ran aground in the Elbe.
Jean	France	The brig was abandoned in the Atlantic Ocean. Her six crew were rescued by the steamship Thales (United Kingdom).
Lord Byron	United Kingdom	The barque was driven ashore 8 nautical miles (15 km) south of Bridlington, Yorkshire. Her crew were rescued. She was on a voyage from Tripoli, Ottoman Tripolitania to Newcastle upon Tyne, Northumberland. She was refloated on 11 December and taken in to Bridlington.
Queenstown	United Kingdom	The schooner foundered in the North Sea off Terschelling, Friesland, Netherlands. Her crew were rescued. She was on a voyage from Falmouth, Cornwall to Harburg, Germany.
Relic	United Kingdom	The smack was driven onto the breakwater in Brixham harbour during a gale and became a total loss. Two fishing boats were grounded and others received damage.
Robinsons	United Kingdom	The ship ran aground at Amble, Northumberland. She was refloated and resumed her voyage, but put into the River Tyne in a leaky condition.
Stour	United Kingdom	The schooner ran aground on the Bow Reef, off Ameland, Friesland, Netherlands and sank. Her four crew survived. She was on a voyage from Falmouth to Harburg.
Swallow	United Kingdom	The schooner was driven ashore and wrecked at Ribadesella, Spain. Her crew were rescued.
Teal	United Kingdom	The steamship ran aground on the Neilstack. She was on a voyage from Hamburg, Germany to London. She was refloated and resumed her voyage.
Unite	France	The schooner struck the breakwater at Cherbourg and was wrecked. Her crew were rescued. She was on a voyage from Porthcawl, Glamorgan, United Kingdom to Trouville-sur-Mer, Calvados.
Unnamed	United Kingdom	The schooner was abandoned off Mousehole, Cornwall.
Unnamed	United Kingdom	The barque was driven ashore at Portland, Dorset.

== 5 December ==
List of shipwrecks: 5 December 1879
Ship	State	Description
Anglia	United Kingdom	The steamship was driven ashore on Pladda, in the Firth of Clyde. She was on a voyage from New York, United States to Glasgow, Renfrewshire. She was refloated the next day and resumed her voyage.
Ary Scheffer	Netherlands	The steamship ran aground at Maassluis, South Holland. She was on a voyage from Rotterdam, South Holland to Havre de Grâce, Seine-Inférieure, France. She was refloated.
Bella	United States	Thanks to an unsuccessful tacking attempt during a storm, the 34.83-ton schooner ran aground at the north entrance to Oumnak Island (53°22′N 167°50′W) in the Aleutian Islands. Her crew of five survived, but she broke up on the beach and was deemed beyond repair.
Capella	United Kingdom	The steamship foundered off Corrubedo, Spain. Her crew were rescued. She was on a voyage from Alexandria, Egypt to Hull, Yorkshire.
Caledonian	United Kingdom	The dredger was run into by the steamship Enniskillen (United Kingdom) at Grangemouth, Stirlingshire and was severely damaged.
Gelderland	Netherlands	The ship ran aground in the Nieuwe Waterweg. She was on a voyage from Java, Netherlands East Indies to Rotterdam. She was refloated.
Risurrezzione	Italy	The barque was wrecked at Cape Helles, Ottoman Empire. She was on a voyage from Yelsk, Russia to Malta.
Romola	United Kingdom	The schooner was taken in tow to Dartmouth by the steamship Yorkshireman (United Kingdom). Romola was found dismasted and abandoned, in the English Channel approximately 60 miles (97 km) west of Start Point.
St. Anne	France	The brigantine was abandoned in the Atlantic Ocean 15 nautical miles (28 km) off Ouessant, Finistère. Two people were rescued by the steamship Lequitio (Spain).
Uller	Norway	The ship struck the breakwater at Middlesbrough, Yorkshire, United Kingdom and was damaged. She was on a voyage from Kragerø to Middlesbrough.

== 6 December ==
List of shipwrecks: 6 December 1879
Ship	State	Description
Albert	United Kingdom	The steamship ran aground at Maassluis, South Holland, Netherlands. She was on a voyage from Hull, Yorkshire to Rotterdam, South Holland. She was refloated on 8 December.
Ampthill	United Kingdom	The ship was driven ashore near Roquetas, Spain. She was on a voyage from Oran, Algeria to Dunkirk, Nord, France. She was refloated and take in to Almería, Spain.
Annie	United Kingdom	The steamship ran aground at Barrow-in-Furness, Lancashire. She was on a voyage from Barrow-in-Furness to Baltimore, Maryland, United States.
Anniversary	United Kingdom	The barque was damaged by fire at Greenock, Renfrewshire.
Captain Cook, and Shelburne	United Kingdom; Canada	The steamships collided in the River Liffey and were both severely damaged.
Emerald	(United Kingdom of Great Britain and Ireland) Guernsey	The brig foundered off the coast of Portugal. Her sixteen crew were rescued by the brigantine Queen of the Isles (United Kingdom). Emerald was on a voyage from Newcastle upon Tyne, Northumberland to Ancona, Italy.
Frances	United Kingdom	The ship was driven ashore at Ballamacormick Point, County Antrim. She was on a voyage from Belfast, County Antrim to Ayr.
George Bartram	United Kingdom	The ship ran aground at Sunderland, County Durham. She was on a voyage from Söderhamn, Sweden to Sunderland. She was refloated and taken in to Sunderland in a leaky condition.
Irene	Denmark	The ship was driven ashore on St. Mary's Island, County Durham and was severely damaged. She was refloated and towed in to North Shields, Northumberland.
Marie	United Kingdom	The ship was wrecked at Valparaíso, Chile. Her crew were rescued.
Milton	United Kingdom	The tugboat was run down and sunk in the River Thames at London by the Transport ship Eurpoa (Italy) with the loss of a crew member .
Motorska Vila	Russia	The ship ran aground in the Dardanelles. She was on a voyage from Feodosiya to Malta.
Niemann	United Kingdom	The steamship ran aground at Maassluis. She was on a voyage from Riga, Russia to Schiedam, South Holland. She was refloated on 8 December.
Onward	United Kingdom	The barque ran aground on the Lemon and Ower Sand, in the North Sea. She was on a voyage from Hartlepool, County Durham to Tuticorin, India. She was refloated and put in to Gravesend, Kent in a severely leaky condition.
Prosperete	Norway	The ship was driven ashore at Fort Fisher, North Carolina, United States. She was on a voyage from London to Wilmington, North Carolina.
Romola	United Kingdom	The abandoned ship was towed in to Dartmouth, Devon by the steamship Yorkshireman (United Kingdom).
Stabil	Norway	The barque ran aground in the Mississippi River and was severely damaged. She was refloated and put back to New Orleans, Louisiana, United States.
Yvonne Marie	France	The barque was driven ashore near Roquetas, Spain.

== 7 December ==
List of shipwrecks: 7 December 1879
Ship	State	Description
Anglia	United Kingdom	The steamship ran aground at Dalmuir, Dunbartonshire. She was on a voyage from New York, United States to Glasgow, Renfrewshire.
Captain Parry	United Kingdom	The steam collier was driven ashore near Queenstown, County Cork. She was on a voyage from Newport, Monmouthshire to Cork.
Catharina II	Russia	The steamship ran aground at Maassluis, South Holland, Netherlands. She was on a voyage from Riga to Rotterdam, South Holland. She was refloated the next day.
Dicimus	Malta	The barque was driven ashore at Lampsari Point, Ottoman Empire. She was on a voyage from Taganrog, Russia to Malta.
Hart	(United Kingdom of Great Britain and Ireland) Isle of Man	The schooner ran aground at Amlwch, Anglesey. She was on a voyage from Cardiff, Glamorgan to Amlwch. She was refloated and taken in to Amlwch.
Improvement	United Kingdom	The schooner was destroyed by fire at Penzance, Cornwall.
Mineola	Canada	The schooner broke loose from her moorings in a severe storm in Eastport Bay and drifted ashore on the Eastern Shoal. She was refloated and sailed to Lubec, Maine where she was beached for repairs.
Watersprite	United Kingdom	The barque departed from South Shields, County Durham for Málaga, Spain. No further trace, presumed foundered with the loss of all hands, nine or ten lives.

== 8 December ==
List of shipwrecks: 8 December 1879
Ship	State	Description
Astronom	Germany	The steamship was driven ashore at Donna Nook, Lincolnshire, United Kingdom.
Atalanta	Norway	The barque foundered off the Chassiron Lighthouse, Île d'Oléron, Vendée, France. Her crew were rescued.
Firebrick	United Kingdom	The steamship was driven ashore at Bremen, Germany. She was on a voyage from Newcastle upon Tyne, Northumberland to Bremen. She was refloated with assistance and taken in to Geestemünde, Germany.
Fortuna	Denmark	The derelict schooner was towed in to Grimsby, Lincolnshire by the smack Cyclone (United Kingdom.
Junction	United Kingdom	The ketch was driven onto the Longnose Rock, Margate, Kent. Her crew were rescued by the Coastguard.
Klara	Norway	The brig was wrecked on the Haisborough Sands, in the North Sea off the cost of Norfolk. The crew were picked up from their lifeboat and landed on the following morning. She was on a voyage from North or South Shields, River Tyne to Corsica, France, with coal
Leon	United Kingdom	The derelict brig was driven ashore at Blakeney, Norfolk.
Lesmona	Germany	The ship was sighted in the South Atlantic whilst on a voyage from San Francisco, California, United States to Havre de Grâce, Seine-Inférieure, France. No further trace, reported missing.
Lucile	United Kingdom	The ship ran aground on the Talus Bank, in the Gironde. She was on a voyage from New York, United States to Bordeaux, Gironde, France. She was refloated and taken in to Bordeaux.
Lord Clyde	United Kingdom	The schooner was driven ashore on Dragør, Denmark. She was on a voyage from Danzig, Germany to Dunkirk, Nord. She was refloated with assistance and taken in to Copenhagen, Denmark.
Pet	United Kingdom	The schooner ran aground at the mouth of the River Wear. She was on a voyage from London to the River Wear.
Vesper	United Kingdom	The schooner ran aground on the Bell Reef Rock, 2 nautical miles (3.7 km) north of Ayr.
unknown		An unidentified barque foundered off the Haisborough Sands, off Norfolk, England.

== 9 December ==
List of shipwrecks: 9 December 1879
Ship	State	Description
Emma V.	Canada	The ship departed from Portland, Maine, United States for Falmouth, Cornwall or Queenstown, County Cork, United Kingdom. No further trace, reported missing.
Mary Morica	United Kingdom	The steamship ran aground and was holed by her anchor in the River Usk. She was on a voyage from Newport, Monmouthshire to Bilbao, Spain. She was towed back to Newport.

== 10 December ==
List of shipwrecks: 10 December 1879
Ship	State	Description
Glenlyon	United Kingdom	The barque was abandoned in the Atlantic Ocean. Her crew were rescued. She was on a voyage from Rangoon, Burma to Glasgow, Renfrewshire. She drove ashore and was wrecked on Terceira Island, Azores on 17 December.
Hortensia	Denmark	The schooner was driven ashore on Læsø. She was on a voyage from Newcastle upon Tyne, Northumberland, United Kingdom to Svendborg. She was refloated the next day and taken in to Fredrikshavn in a severely leaky condition.
Mystic	United States	The schooner, stranded near the harbor mouth at Grand Haven, Michigan since 19 November, was washed off the beach in a heavy storm on Lake Michigan out to the bar where she started pounding heavily and was scuttled to prevent further damage. Her three crewmen were rescued by the United States Life Saving Service.
Neptune	United Kingdom	The steamship was driven ashore and wrecked at the Poolbeg Lighthouse, County Dublin.
Sardinian	United Kingdom	The steamship was driven ashore 2 nautical miles (3.7 km) north west of Cromer, Norfolk. She was refloated.
Thomas Dugdale	United Kingdom	The steamship ran aground at Fleetwood, Lancashire. She had been refloated by 13 December.

== 11 December ==
List of shipwrecks: 11 December 1879
Ship	State	Description
Alexandra	United Kingdom	The ship collided with the schoonerSecret (United Kingdom) 5 nautical miles (9.3 km) east of Hartland Point, Devon. She was taken in tow by Bessie Belle (United Kingdom) but consequently sank. Her crew were rescued.
Ariadne	United Kingdom	The steamship collided with the steamship Owl (United Kingdom and sank in the Clyde. Her crew survived. Ariadne was on a voyage from Barrow-in-Furness, Lancashire to Glasgow, Renfrewshire.
Barnard Castle	United Kingdom	The steamship was driven ashore at the mouth of the Stevenston Burn, Ayrshire. She was on a voyage from Montreal, Quebec, Canada to Glasgow, Renfrewshire. She was refloated and resumed her voyage.
Bristol City	United Kingdom	The steamship went ashore, in thick fog, at Nelson Point, at the mouth of the River Avon. She was on a voyage from Bristol to New York. She was refloated and resumed her voyage.
Cleveland	United Kingdom	The steamship was damaged by ice and beached at Snekkersten, Denmark. She was on a voyage from Middlesbrough, Yorkshire to Copenhagen, Denmark. She was refloated and taken in to Copenhagen, where she was placed under repair.
Enos, and Flying Cloud	Norway; United Kingdom	The steam trawler Flying Cloud was driven ashore on the Maydulse Rocks, east of Inchcolm, Fife. She was towing the brig Enos, which also went ashore, but was refloated and put back to Burntisland, Fife.
König Ernst August	Germany	The brig was driven ashore at Morup, Sweden. She was on a voyage from Grimsby, Lincolnshire, United Kingdom to Danzig.
Martha	Germany	The steamship was driven ashore and wrecked at Kuressaare, Russia. She was on a voyage from Stettin to Riga, Russia.
Pallion	United Kingdom	The brig ran aground at Maassluis, South Holland.
Sheldrake	United Kingdom	The steamship foundered in the Raz de Sein. Her crew were rescued. She was on a voyage from Bilbao, Spain to Glasgow.
Sophie Girbetz	Germany	The barque ran aground at "Swinbaden", Sweden. She was on a voyage from Newcastle upon Tyne, Northumberland, United Kingdom to Rostock. She was refloated with the assistance of a steamship.
Vanderbyl	United Kingdom	The steamship was driven ashore and wrecked on the Isle of Whithorn, Wigtownshire. She was on a voyage from Whitehaven, Cumberland to Port William, Wigtownshire.
Vine	United Kingdom	The steamship ran aground at Landskrona, Sweden. She was on a voyage from Sunderland, County Durham to Malmö, Sweden. She was refloated and completed her voyage.

== 12 December ==
List of shipwrecks: 12 December 1879
Ship	State	Description
Bon Père	France	The ship was abandoned in the Bay of Biscay. Her crew were rescued. She was on a voyage from Cardiff, Glamorgan, United Kingdom to Nantes, Loire-Inférieure.
Camellia	United Kingdom	The ship sank in the River Usk.
Elisa	Italy	The barque was wrecked at "Eractitza Point", Ottoman Empire. She was on a voyage from Odesa, Russia to Livorno.
Gottfried	Sweden	The brig was wrecked on Anholt, Denmark. She was on a voyage from South Shields, County Durham, United Kingdom to Karlskrona.
Hero	United Kingdom	The schooner was holed by ice and sank in the Seine at La Mailleraye-sur-Seine, Seine-Inférieure, France. She was on a voyage from Rouen, Seine-Inférieure to Newcastle upon Tyne, Northumberland.
Hopewell	United Kingdom	The barque was wrecked in a cyclone at Hong Kong.
Isabella Ure	United Kingdom	The ship departed from Troon, Ayrshire for Matanzas, Cuba. No further trace, presumed foundered with the loss of all sixteen crew.
Maria	France	The barque was wrecked in a cyclone at Hong Kong.
Twilight	United States	The full-rigged ship was damaged in a cyclone at Hong Kong.
Whittington	United Kingdom	The ship departed from Philadelphia, Pennsylvania, United States for Queenstown, County Cork. No further trace,. presumed foundered with the loss of all 25 crew.

== 13 December ==
List of shipwrecks: 13 December 1879
Ship	State	Description
Ormoc	United Kingdom	The steamship was wrecked at "Dupon", Leyte, Spanish East Indies. Her crew were rescued.
Pedrito	Spain	The schooner was destroyed by fire at Nuevitas, Cuba.
Santiago	Spain	The schooner foundered in the Atlantic Ocean. Her crew were rescued. She was on a voyage from Liverpool, Lancashire, United Kingdom to Rosario Brazil.
Trident	United Kingdom	The steamship was run into by the steamship Lord Eslington and sank off the east Kent coast. Some of her crew were rescued by Lord Eslington, others reached land in a boat. Trident was on a voyage from Alexandria, Egypt to Hull, Yorkshire.
Twee Gezusters	Netherlands	The ship was abandoned in the Atlantic Ocean (46°11′N 15°35′W). Her crew were rescued by East Croft (United Kingdom).
St. Malcolm	United Kingdom	The ship was sighted in the Indian Ocean whilst on a voyage from Calcutta, India to London. No further trace, reported missing.
Usworth	United Kingdom	The steamship collided with the steamship Ituna in the River Thames. She was beached at Plaistow, Middlesex, where she sank.
Wave	United Kingdom	The ship ran aground off Formby, Lancashire. She was on a voyage from Brussels, Flemish Brabant, Belgium to Runcorn, Cheshire. Wave was refloated and found to be severely leaky. She was abandoned and sank on 16 December. Her crew survived.

== 14 December ==
List of shipwrecks: 14 December 1879
Ship	State	Description
Artie Garwood	United States	The schooner stranded in a gale with high seas 2 nautical miles (3.7 km) south of Life Saving Station No.4, 4th District on the New Jersey coast and broke up. Her seven crew were rescued by the United States Life Saving Service.
Charlotte	United Kingdom	The brigantine was driven ashore at Robin Hoods Bay, Yorkshire. She was refloated.
Sarah Jane	United Kingdom	The ship ran aground and sank in the River Mersey. She was on a voyage from Irvine, Ayrshire to Runcorn, Cheshire.
Usworth	United Kingdom	The steamship collided with the steamship Ituna (United Kingdom) in the River Thames at Plaistow, Essex. Usworth was beached and sank.

== 15 December ==
List of shipwrecks: 15 December 1879
Ship	State	Description
Arcangelo Gabriel	Italy	The brig was wrecked at Rio de Janeiro, Brazil. Her crew were rescued. She was on a voyage from Rio de Janeiro to New York, United States.
Dunstanborough	United Kingdom	The steamship ran aground on the Banjaard Sand, in the North Sea off the coast of Zeeland, Netherlands.
Sampson	United Kingdom	The paddle tug ran aground off Sheerness, Kent. She was towing a lighter from Sheerness to Deptford. She was refloated but was then run into by the lighter, severely damaging one of her paddle wheels. She put back to Sheerness.
William Bateman	United Kingdom	The ship was wrecked at Hjørring, Denmark. Her crew were rescued. She was on a voyage from Grimsby, Lincolnshire to Malmö, Sweden. She was later refloated and taken in to Copenhagen, Denmark, where she arrived on 17 February.

== 16 December ==
List of shipwrecks: 16 December 1879
Ship	State	Description
Andreas	Norway	The brig was driven ashore and wrecked at Fife Ness, Fife, United Kingdom. She was on a voyage from a French port to Leith, Lothian, United Kingdom.
Bona Fides	United Kingdom	The fishing vessel ran aground and sank off The Lizard, Cornwall. Her crew were rescued.
Hamsteels	United Kingdom	The steamship struck the pier at West Hartlepool, County Durham and was severely damaged. She was on a voyage from London to West Hartlepool.
Holmbrook	United Kingdom	The steamship ran aground in the Seine at Villequier, Seine-Inférieure. She was refloated and taken in to Rouen, Seine-Inférieure in a leaky condition.
Jane Hoad	United Kingdom	The ship was run down and sunk 5 nautical miles (9.3 km) off Cromer, Norfolk by the steamship Lepanto (United Kingdom). Her eight crew were rescued by Lepanto. Jane Hoad was on a voyage from Seaham, County Durham to Rye, Sussex.
Open Sea	United States	The schooner stranded on a reef off Napatree Point, a total loss of vessel and cargo. Her crew of five rescued by the United States Life Saving Service.
Two Brothers	United Kingdom	The fishing vessel foundered off The Lizard. Her crew were rescued by the fishing vessel Orlando (United Kingdom).
Voluna	United Kingdom	The steamship sprang a leak and foundered in the Atlantic Ocean 300 nautical miles (560 km) off Cape Clear Island, County Cork (49°20′N 12°53′W). Her crew were rescued by the barque Chepica (United Kingdom). Voluna was on a voyage from Glasgow, Renfrewshire to Montego Bay, Jamaica.

== 17 December ==
List of shipwrecks: 17 December 1879
Ship	State	Description
Anna	Netherlands	The steamship ran aground and sank at Bergen, Norway with the loss of five of her crew.
Dere	Sweden	The abandoned schooner was towed in to Fredrikshavn, Denmark. She was on a voyage from Newcastle upon Tyne, Northumberland, United Kingdom to Halmstad.
Express	United Kingdom	The ship struck the breakwater and sank at Memel, Germany. She was on a voyage from Memel to Burntisland, Fife.
Felice Pirandello	United Kingdom	The ship was driven ashore at Constantinople, Ottoman Empire. She was on a voyage from Taganrog, Russia to an English port. She was refloated and taken in to Constantinople.
Forest King	Canada	The full-rigged ship was driven ashore near Calais, France. She was on a voyage from Philadelphia, Pennsylvania, United States to Calais.
Good Intent	United Kingdom	The smack sank at Bridgwater, Somerset. She was on a voyage from Cardiff, Glamorgan to Bridgwater.
Guy Mannering	United Kingdom	The ship was driven ashore at Dungeness, Kent.
Iwalo	(Russian Empire) Grand Duchy of Finland	The ship was wrecked on Cuttyhunk Island, Massachusetts, United States. She was on a voyage from Jakobstad to Boston, Massachusetts.
Mary	United Kingdom	The smack ran aground on the Elbow Bank, in the Solent.
Northern Crown	United Kingdom	The ship was driven ashore and wrecked at Stornoway, Isle of Lewis, Outer Hebrides.
Unnamed	France	The brig was driven ashore and wrecked at Cobo, Guernsey, Channel Islands. Her crew were rescued.

== 18 December ==
List of shipwrecks: 18 December 1879
Ship	State	Description
Clerus	United Kingdom	The ship departed from Lossiemouth, Moray for Hartlepool, County Durham. No further trace, reported severely overdue.
Commonwealth	United Kingdom	The steamship was wrecked on Andros, Greece with the loss of all hands. She was on a voyage from Odesa, Russia to Antwerp, Belgium.
Salus	France	The brig was lost in the Seine downstream of Caudebec-en-Caux, Seine-Inférieure, France due to ice. Her crew were rescued.
Typhis	France	The brig was driven ashore and wrecked on the west coast of Guernsey, Channel Islands. Her crew were rescued.
Unnamed	France	The fishing smack was run into by the steamship Crane (United States) and sank at Havre de Grâce, Seine-Inférieure.

== 19 December ==
List of shipwrecks: 19 December 1879
Ship	State	Description
Derby	United Kingdom	The brig, carrying mahogany, foundered nine days out of Minatitlán, Mexico. The crew, bar two, were picked up by Resolute (United Kingdom) and the captain only survived a few days.
Govino	United Kingdom	The steamship ran aground at Bristol, Gloucestershire. She was on a voyage from Avonmouth, Somerset to Bristol.
James	United Kingdom	The schooner ran ashore on "Lerdy Isle". She was on a voyage from Troon, Ayrshire to Stranraer, Wigtownshire.
Johanni	Germany	The schooner was wrecked at Estreito. Brazil with the loss of all but two of her crew.
Lucy	United Kingdom	The steam launch was run into by the steamboat Camilla (United Kingdom) and sank in the River Thames at Cuckold's Point, Middlesex.
Manilla	Italy	The steamship ran aground on The Skerries, off Start Point, Devon, United Kingdom. She was on a voyage from London, United Kingdom to Bombay, India. Manilla was refloated with assistance from the steamship Upupa (United Kingdom and was towed in to Falmouth, Cornwall, United Kingdom .
Margaret Elizabeth	United Kingdom	The oyser smack was driven ashore and wrecked in Bracelet Bay, Glamorgan.
Peri	United Kingdom	The ship was driven ashore and damaged on Terschelling, Friesland, Netherlands.
Pet	United Kingdom	The schooner ran aground at Sunderland, County Durham. She was on a voyage from London to Sunderland.
Prins van Oranje	Netherlands	The steamship ran aground at Maassluis, South Holland. She was on a voyage from Dunkirk, Nord, France to Rotterdam, South Holland. She was refloated.
W. H. Atkinson	United Kingdom	The steamship ran aground off Cabrita Point, Spain. She was beached on the Isla de Las Palomas, Spain, where she was subsequently wrecked. Her 21 crew were rescued by an Italian barque. W. H. Atkinson was on a voyage from Alexandria, Egypt to Newcastle upon Tyne, Northumberland.

== 20 December ==
List of shipwrecks: 20 December 1879
Ship	State	Description
Austrian	United Kingdom	The steamship ran aground in the Clyde. She was on a voyage from the Clyde to Liverpool, Lancashire. She was refloated on 22 December and resumed her voyage.
Chevreul	France	The barque was driven ashore north of Carnsore, County Wexford, United Kingdom. All thirteen people on board were rescued by the Carnsore lifeboat. She was on a voyage from French Equatorial Africa to Glasgow, Renfrewshire, United Kingdom. She subsequently broke up.
Nestorian	United Kingdom	The steamship ran aground in the Clyde. She was refloated on 22 December.
N. Noyes	Canada	The schooner was wrecked at Cape Negro, Nova Scotia. Her crew were rescued. She was on a voyage from Charlottetown, Prince Edward Island to New York.
Strathmore	United Kingdom	The ship was damaged by fire at Liverpool, Lancashire.
Trellis	United Kingdom	The schooner was damaged and disabled in a collision with an unknown schooner and went ashore the next day one mile (1.6 km) north north east of the Life Saving Station No. 13, 2nd District on the coast of Massachusetts, a total loss. Her crew was rescued by the United States Life Saving Service.
Western Belle	United Kingdom	The ship ran aground at Pensacola, Florida, United States. She was on a voyage from Pensacola to Greenock, Renfrewshire. She was refloated the next day and resumed her voyage.
Whitney Long	United States	The schooner sank on Hatteras Shoal in five fathoms (30 ft; 9.1 m) of water, a total loss of vessel and cargo. Her crew got off on their ship's boat and were helped through the surf by the United States Life Saving Service.
Zephyrus	United Kingdom	The brig ran aground at Shrape Point, Isle of Wight. She was on a voyage from South Shields, County Durham to West Cowes, Isle of Wight. She was refloated with the assistance of a tug and taken in to West Cowes.

== 21 December ==
List of shipwrecks: 21 December 1879
Ship	State	Description
Adelphoi	New South Wales	The barque was wrecked off Port Hacking, New South Wales, Australia.
Bittern	United Kingdom	The steamship ran aground in the River Thames at Barking, Essex. Her passengers were taken off by Boreas (United Kingdom).
Broomshields, and G. B. S.	United Kingdom	The schooner Broomshields was run into by the barque G. B. S. and sank off the Outer Dowsing Sandbank, in the North Sea. Some of her crew were reported missing. G. B. S. was on a voyage from South Shields, County Durham to Java, Netherlands East Indies. She was assisted in to Grimsby, Lincolnshire by the steamship Thames (United Kingdom) and beached with the assistance of two tugs.
City of Toledo	United States	The steamer ran aground in a gale and snowstorm six miles (9.7 km) south of Life Saving Station No. 6, 11th District on the Michigan coast. Her captain and a few crew made it to shore in the ship's boat, the rest of the 24 on board were rescued by the United States Life Saving Service.
Edinburgh	United Kingdom	The steamship ran aground at Banjoewanjie, Netherlands East Indies.
Henriette	France	The steam yacht was abandoned in the Atlantic Ocean off Cape Hatteras, Virginia, United States. Her crew were rescued by the barque Sabine (Norway). Henriette was subsequently taken in to the Hampton Roads, Virginia, United States.
Rozelle	United Kingdom	The ship was sighted in the Pentland Firth whilst on a voyage from the River Tyne to Bombay, India. No further trace, reported overdue.
T. J. Trafton	United States	The schooner wrecked eight miles (13 km) north east of Manomet Point, Massachusetts. Her crew made it to shore in the ship's boat.

== 22 December ==
List of shipwrecks: 22 December 1879
Ship	State	Description
Agnes	Sweden	The ship sank near Lysekil. She was on a voyage from Grimsby, Lincolnshire, United Kingdom to Gothenburg.
Anna Bertha	Germany	The barque was driven ashore on Nexø, Denmark. She was on a voyage from Liverpool, Lancashire, United Kingdom to Danzig.
Artos	United Kingdom	The steamship ran aground on the Hale Sand, in the North Sea off the coast of Lincolnshire. She was on a voyage from Alexandria, Egypt to Hull, Yorkshire. She was refloated with the assistance of a tug and completed her voyage.
Black Swan	United States	The bark dragged anchor in a gale with snow and heavy seas and was wrecked 1 1/2 nautical miles (2.8 km) east north east of Life Saving Station No. 14, 2nd District, on the coast of Massachusetts. Her eight crewmen were rescued by the United States Life Saving Service.
Caledonian	United Kingdom	The steamship ran aground at Avonmouth, Somerset. She was on a voyage from New York, United States to Avonmouth. She was refloated and docked.
Henrique	Spain	The barque was driven ashore at Atherfield, Isle of Wight, United Kingdom. She was on a voyage from New Orleans, Louisiana, United States to Leith, Lothian, United Kingdom. She subsequently broke up.
Martino Maria	United Kingdom	The barque ran aground at Great Yarmouth, Norfolk. She was on a voyage from South Shields, County Durham to Villaricos, Spain. She was refloated with assistance and resumed her voyage.
Progress	United Kingdom	The ship was driven ashore south of Flamborough Head, Yorkshire. She was on a voyage from Great Yarmouth, Norfolk to Sunderland, County Durham. She was refloated with assistance and taken in to Scarborough, Yorkshire.
Solem	Norway	The brigantine struck rocks and sank in Vestfjorden. She was on a voyage from South Shields to Vardø.

== 23 December ==
List of shipwrecks: 23 December 1879
Ship	State	Description
Alert	United Kingdom	The schooner was abandoned 20 nautical miles (37 km) off the Isle of May. Her crew took to a boat; they were rescued by a Russian vessel.
Alfred	United Kingdom	The pilot schooner was run down and sunk in the Irish Sea 1 nautical mile (1.9 km) south of the Wyre Lighthouse by the fishing smack Osprey (United Kingdom). Her crew were rescued.
Alice Bradshar	Canada	The ship struck a sunken rock off "Downend", Devon, United Kingdom and was holed. She was being towed from Dartmouth to Exmouth. She arrived at Exmouth in a leaky condition.
Bendigo	United Kingdom	The steamship ran aground on the Haisborough Sands, in the North Sea off the coast of Norfolk. She was refloated and resumed her voyage.
Bjornstjerne Bjornson	Norway	The steamship was sighted off Bergen whilst on a voyage from Newcastle upon Tyne, Northumberland, United Kingdom to Trondheim. No further trace, reported overdue.
Johann Feldman	Russia	The full-rigged ship was driven ashore at Liverpool, Lancashire, United Kingdom. She was on a voyage from Liverpool to Rangoon, Burma.
Kate	United Kingdom	The ship departed from Queenstown, County Cork for Dundee, Forfarshire. No further trace, reported hopelessly overdue.

== 24 December ==
List of shipwrecks: 24 December 1879
Ship	State	Description
Maid of Orleans	Flag unknown	The ship departed from Philadelphia, Pennsylvania, United States for Havre de Grâce, Seine-Inférieure, France. No further trace, reported "hopelessly overdue".

== 25 December ==
List of shipwrecks: 25 December 1879
Ship	State	Description
Britannia	United Kingdom	The tug was run down and sunk 3 nautical miles (5.6 km) off Inchkeith, Fife by the steamship Fitzwilliam (United Kingdom). Her crew survived.
Fanny Beck	United Kingdom	The brigantine foundered off the "Isle of Tova", off the coast of Patagonia.
Moray	United Kingdom	The brigantine was driven ashore at Kristianopel, Sweden. She was on a voyage from Danzig, Germany to Hayle, Cornwall. She was refloated on 5 January 1880 and taken in to Karlskrona, Sweden.
Peter Paul	Russia	The schooner was driven ashore and damaged 2 nautical miles (3.7 km) west of Ystad, Sweden. She was on a voyage from Newcastle upon Tyne, Northumberland, United Kingdom to Ystad. She was refloated on 31 December and taken in to Ystad for repairs.
Petrel	France	The steamship was driven ashore at Calais.
Salisbury	United Kingdom	The steamship ran aground at Cimbritshamn, Sweden. She was on a voyage from Libava, Courland Governorate to Leith, Lothian. She was refloated and taken in to Copenhagen, Denmark in a leaky condition.

== 26 December ==
List of shipwrecks: 26 December 1879
Ship	State	Description
Bottreaux Castle	United Kingdom	The smack was driven ashore and wrecked at Boscastle, Cornwall. Her crew were rescued. She was on a voyage from Newport, Monmouthshire to Boscastle.
Clansman	United Kingdom	The barquentine ran aground in the River Ouse. she was on a voyage from Jamaica to Goole, Yorkshire. She was refloated and taken in to Goole.
Eastbourne	United Kingdom	The steamship ran aground at Cardiff, Glamorgan. She was on a voyage from Cardiff to Naples, Italy.
Ella	United Kingdom	The steamship departed from Dundee, Forfarshire for South Shields, County Durham. No further trace, presumed foundered with the loss of all hands.
Portugalete	United Kingdom	The steamship ran aground at Cardiff. She was on a voyage from Porthcawl to Cardiff.
Sunbeam	United Kingdom	The schooner ran aground at Cardiff.

== 27 December ==
List of shipwrecks: 27 December 1879
Ship	State	Description
Alma	United Kingdom	The schooner was driven ashore and wrecked at Burntisland, Fife. She was on a voyage from Inverness to Charlestown, Cornwall.
Alneburgh	United Kingdom	The ship departed from San Francisco, California for a British port. No further trace, presumed foundered with the loss of all 25 crew.
Bradley	United Kingdom	The steamship was driven ashore at Sheringham, Norfolk. She was on a voyage from Sunderland, County Durham to London.
Castlehill	United Kingdom	The schooner was sighted whilst on a voyage from South Shields, County Durham to Castlehill. No further trace, presumed foundered with the loss of all five crew.
Elizabeth	United Kingdom	The sloop sprang a leak and sank in the Rock Channel. Her crew survived.
Philemon	Russia	The barque was wrecked on the coast of Halland, Sweden. She was on a voyage from Hartlepool, County Durham, United Kingdom to Malmö, Sweden.
Unnamed	United Kingdom	The schooner sank in the Sound of Mull with the loss of all hands.

== 28 December ==
List of shipwrecks: 28 December 1879
Ship	State	Description
Agile	Norway	The schooner was wrecked at Soggendal with some loss of life. She was on a voyage from Spain to Bergen.
Agnes Irving	New South Wales	The paddle steamer was wrecked in the Macleay River, Trial Bay, New South Wales.
Amalie	Norway	The schooner was wrecked at Soggendal with some loss of life. She was on a voyage from Spain to Bergen.
Cierus	Germany	The ship departed from Lossiemouth, Moray for Hartlepool, County Durham, United Kingdom. No further trace, reported missing.
Fonfrède	France	The barque foundered 3 nautical miles (5.6 km) north of The Skerries, Anglesey, United Kingdom with the loss of eight of her twelve crew. Survivors were rescued by the tug British King (United Kingdom). Fonfrède was on a voyage from Liverpool, Lancashire, United Kingdom to Port-au-Prince, Haiti.
Hertha	Denmark	The barque was driven ashore at "Sordrum", Sweden.
Irene	Austria-Hungary	The barque was driven ashore at Rowse's Point, County Sligo, United Kingdom.
Lissabon	Germany	The steamship ran aground on the Longsand, in the North Sea off the coast of Essex, United Kingdom. She was on a voyage from Hamburg to a Spanish port. She was refloated with assistance from the Harwich Lifeboat and taken in to London, United Kingdom.
Minona	Sweden	The barque ran aground on the Goodwin Sands, Kent, United Kingdom. She was on a voyage from St. Ubes, Portugal to Gothenburg. She floated off and sank. Her crew took to a boat; they were rescued by Tasmania (United Kingdom).
Norseman	United Kingdom	The steamship foundered off Portpatrick, Wigtownshire with the loss of al hands, eight or ten lives. She was on a voyage from Workington, Cumberland to Bowling, Dunbartonshire.
Pearl	(United Kingdom of Great Britain and Ireland) Isle of Man	The ship was driven ashore at McCrinan's Point, Argyllshire. She was on a voyage from Girvan, Ayrshire to Cork. She was later refloated and taken in to Campbeltown, Argyllshire in a leaky condition.
Rival	United Kingdom	The brig was wrecked on the Cross Sand, in the North Sea off the coast of Norfolk. Her eight crew were rescued by the Caister Lifeboat.
Rumney	United Kingdom	The steamship ran aground in the Gironde. She was on a voyage from Newport, Monmouthshire to Bordeaux, Gironde, France.
Sardonyx	United Kingdom	The steamship foundered off the coast of County Limerick with the loss of all thirteen crew. She was on a voyage from the Clyde to Limerick.
Star of Peace	United Kingdom	The Thames barge was run into by the steamship Fusilier (United Kingdom) and sank in the River Thames at Blackwall, Middlesex. Her crew were rescued.
Vila Nova	United Kingdom	The brigantine was driven ashore and wrecked at Thurlestone, Devon. Her crew were rescued. She was on a voyage from Saint-Malo, Ille-et-Vilaine, France to Cardiff, Glamorgan.
W. H. Thorndike	United States	The ship was wrecked on the Sow and Pigs Reef. She was on a voyage from New York to Boston, Massachusetts.

== 29 December ==
List of shipwrecks: 29 December 1879
Ship	State	Description
Agnes C. James	United Kingdom	The ship ran aground on the North Bank, in the Irish Sea. She was on a voyage from Maryport, Cumberland to Belfast, County Antrim.
Ardenlea	United Kingdom	The ship was driven ashore in the Gare Loch.
Argo	United Kingdom	The brigantine foundered in the North Sea off Filey, Yorkshire. Her five crew survived. She was on a voyage from London to Hartlepool, County Durham.
Elizabeth Hendrika	Netherlands	The galiot was driven ashore in Roljew Cove, near Mullion, Cornwall, United Kingdom. Three of her crew were rescued by rocket apparatus; her captain refused to abandon ship. She was on a voyage from Havre de Grâce, Seine-Inférieure, France to Bilbao, Spain.
Margaret	United Kingdom	The steamship was driven ashore at Redcar, Yorkshire. She was refloated.
Marguerite	France	The cutter was driven ashore at "Dwarsinweg". She was on a voyage from "Dolto" to Antwerp, Belgium.
Minna	United Kingdom	The schooner was driven ashore at Liepāja, Russia. Her crew were rescued by the Liepāja Lifeboat. She was on a voyage from Liepāja to Lübeck.
Remesis	United Kingdom	The ship was driven ashore in the Gare Loch.
Thomas Graham	United Kingdom	The crewless schooner was driven ashore at Portballintrae, County Antrim.
Villa Nova	United Kingdom	The schooner was driven ashore and wrecked at Salcombe, Devon. Her crew survived. She was on a voyage from Saint-Malo, Ille-et-Vilaine, France to Cardiff, Glamorgan.
William Burkitt	United Kingdom	The steamship ran aground at Gislöv, Sweden. She was on a voyage from Savannah, Georgia, United States to Reval, Russia. She was refloated in February 1880 and taken in to Copenhagen, Denmark.

== 30 December ==
List of shipwrecks: 30 December 1879
Ship	State	Description
Benjamin Sewall	United States	The full-rigged ship was driven ashore in the Bangka Strait. She was on a voyage from Singapore, Straits Settlements to New York. She was refloated in January 1880 and taken in to Batavia, Netherlands East Indies for repairs.
Catharina	Denmark	The ship was driven ashore at Gothenburg, Sweden. She was on a voyage from Burntisland, Fife, United Kingdom to Svendborg.
Dagmar	Denmark	The ship foundered with the loss of all but two of her crew. She was on a voyage from Burntisland to Svendborg.
Etje	Germany	The galiot was driven ashore near Farsund, Norway. Her crew were rescued. She was on a voyage from Copenhagen to Leer.
Fred	United States	The barque was driven ashore at Bowmore, Islay, United Kingdom.
J. P. Taylor	United Kingdom	The steamship arrived at Bremen, Germany on fire. She was on a voyage from Newcastle upon Tyne, Northumberland to Brake, Germany.
Leda	Germany	The full-rigged ship ran aground on the Goodwin Sands, Kent, United Kingdom and was wrecked. Her nineteen crew were rescued by the North Deal Lifeboat. She was on a voyage from New York, United States to Bremen.
Lini	Russia	The barque was driven ashore and wrecked near the Lista Lighthouse, Norway. Her crew were rescued. She was on a voyage from Riga to Grangemouth, Stirlingshire, United Kingdom.
Mary	United Kingdom	The ship was driven ashore at Bowmore. She was on a voyage from Mulroy Bay to Belfast, County Antrim.
Otago	United Kingdom	The full-rigged ship was damaged by ice and was beached at Bremen. She was on a voyage from New York to Bremen. She was refloated the next day with the assistance of three steamships and towed in to Bremen.
South Esk	United Kingdom	The brigantine was wrecked on Eigg, Inner Hebrides with the loss of five of her six crew.
Vittoria	Italy	The ship ran aground on the Goodwin Sands. She was on a voyage from Genoa to Berwick upon Tweed, Northumberland, United Kingdom. She was refloated and taken in to Ramsgate, Kent in a sinking condition by the tug Warrior (United Kingdom).
Wolf	United Kingdom	The ship foundered off Ventnor, Isle of Wight.

== 31 December ==
List of shipwrecks: 31 December 1879
Ship	State	Description
Brother Jonathan and Kate Kearney	United Kingdom	The paddle tug Brorther Jonathan sank south of Small Saltee Island, County Wexford with the immediate loss of ten of her twelve crew. She had departed from Queenstown, County Cork on 29 December towing the barque Kate Kearney (United Kingdom) bound for London. The barque was in a severely leaky condition, and had taken on extra hands for the voyage. She was presumed to have foundered with the loss of all on board. One of the two survivors from Brother Jonathan died on 9 January.
Eleanor	United Kingdom	The barque was driven ashore near the Hen and Chickens Rocks, County Antrim. She was on a voyage from New York, United States to Belfast, County Antrim.
Ernst	Germany	The barque was wrecked at Summer House Point, Glamorgan, United Kingdom with the loss of four of her ten crew. She was on a voyage from Queenstown to Newcastle upon Tyne, Northumberland, United Kingdom.
Ida	Germany	The barque was driven ashore and wrecked at Breaksea Point, Glamorgan with the loss of nine of her ten crew. She was on a voyage from Cardiff, Glamorgan to Tenerife, Canary Islands.
Martha	United Kingdom	The pilot boat was driven ashore in the River Usk.
William J. Taylor	United Kingdom	The steamship collided with the steamship H. P. Stephenson (United Kingdom) and sank at the mouth of the River Tyne. Her eleven crew were rescued by H. P. Stephenson. William J. Taylor was on her maiden voyage, from the River Tyne to Dunkirk, Nord, France. She was refloated in January 1880 and beached. Repaired at Wallsend, County Durham in March 1880 and returned to service.
Winifred	United Kingdom	The ship departed from New Orleans, Louisiana, United States for Queenstown. No further trace, reported overdue.

== Unknown date ==
List of shipwrecks: Unknown date in December 1879
Ship	State	Description
Alarm	Fiji	The cutter was driven ashore in a cyclone at Fiji.
Albert	United Kingdom	The barge was run down and sunk by the paddle steamer Flushing (Flag unknown) at Sheerness, Kent. Her crew were rescued.
Aldebaran	Norway	The barque sprang a leak and was abandoned in the Atlantic Ocean in early December. Her fourteen crew were rescued by the barque Shane (Norway). Aldebaran was on a voyage from Baltimore, Maryland, United States to Amsterdam, North Holland, Netherlands.
Alexander Mackenzie	United Kingdom	The full-rigged ship was driven ashore and wrecked at Blankenberge, West Flanders, Belgium. Her crew were rescued. She was on a voyage from New York, United States to Antwerp, Belgium.
Altona	United Kingdom	The steamship was driven ashore at Lühe, Germany. She was on a voyage from Hamburg, Germany to Goole, Yorkshire.
Anna	United Kingdom	The schooner ran aground at Torekov, Sweden.
Anna Olivari	France	The ship was abandoned at sea. She was on a voyage from Havre de Grâce, Seine-Inférieure to Buenos Aires, Argentina.
Atalanta	Norway	The barque foundered off the Chassiron Lighthouses, Île d'Oléron, Charente-Inférieure, France. Her crew were rescued.
Atlantic	Norway	The barque was abandoned in the Atlantic Ocean before 16 December. She was towed in to Glendore, County Cork, United Kingdom in mid-January 1880 by the tug Lord Warden (United Kingdom).
August Blanche	Sweden	The steamship was driven ashore on Skagen, Denmark.
Aurora	Spain	The steamship was wrecked on the Mosquito Coast. Her crew were rescued.
Balmarino	United Kingdom	The ship was driven ashore at Kilroot, County Antrim. She was on a voyage from Belfast, County Antrim to Ayr.
Benledi	United Kingdom	The ship was wrecked in the Abrolhos Islands, Western Australia. Her crew were rescued. She was on a voyage from Sydney, New South Wales to Calcutta, India.
Bilbao	Spain	The steamship foundered off the Berlengas, Portugal. Her crew were rescued by the barque Ajan (Russia). Bilbao was on a voyage from Antwerp to Cádiz.
Brilliant	United Kingdom	The brig was wrecked at Torekov. Her crew were rescued.
Byron	Fiji	The cutter foundered off Nunda Point in a cyclone with the loss of two lives.
Carbonaria	United Kingdom	The brig ran aground at Cowes, Isle of Wight.
Chinaman	United Kingdom	The barque ran aground at Shanghai, China. She was refloated but was then run into by the steamship Kiangteen (China).
Christine	United Kingdom	The ship was driven ashore on Amager, Denmark. She was on a voyage from Stettin, Germany to Sunderland, County Durham.
Christine	United Kingdom	The ship was wrecked in the Falkland Islands. Her crew were rescued.
Clara	Sweden	The schooner was driven ashore on Skagen. She was later refloated and taken in to Fredrikshavn.
Comeragh	United Kingdom	The steamship ran aground at Waterford. She was refloated.
Constantinos	Greece	The brig was driven ashore and wrecked at Sfântu Gheorghe, United Principalities. Her crew survived. She was on a voyage from Brăila, United Principalities to Syros.
Curlew	United Kingdom	The steamship was driven ashore at Sunderland.
Dan Kelly	Canada	The schooner was wrecked with the loss of four of her crew.
Die Schwalbe	Germany	The barque collided with the steamship Glenavon (United Kingdom) and sank in the Kattegat with the loss of four of her crew. Die Schwalbe was on a voyage from Grimsby, Lincolnshire. United Kingdom to Danzig.
Dona Zoyla	Germany	The ship was driven ashore at Atherfield, Isle of Wight, United Kingdom and broke her back.
Dore	Sweden	The schooner was abandoned at sea. She was subsequently towed in to Fredrikshavn.
Eaglet	United Kingdom	The brigantine ran aground on Les Traverses, in the Seine. She was refloated and taken in to Rouen, Seine-Inférieure, France in a leaky condition.
Elizabeth	United Kingdom	The barque ran aground in the Banka Strait. She was on a voyage from Bangkok, Siam to the English Channel.
Emerald	United Kingdom	The ship was driven ashore and wrecked on the Black Rock, east of Portrush, County Antrim. Her crew were rescued. She was on a voyage from Sligo to Liverpool, Lancashire.
Emilie	Norway	The schooner was driven ashore on Skagen. She was on a voyage from Gothenburg, Sweden to Leith, Lothian, United Kingdom.
Eugénie Léonie	France	The barque was wrecked at Dunkirk, Nord with the loss of two of her fifteen crew. Survivors were rescued by a tug. She was on a voyage from Dunkirk to Philadelphia, Pennsylvania, United States.
Ferry Queen	United Kingdom	The ship was abandoned at sea. Her crew were rescued by the steamship Secret (United Kingdom). Ferry Queen was on a voyage from Marseille, Bouches-du-Rhône, France to Hamburg.
Frank	United Kingdom	The ship was driven ashore at Hamilton, Bermuda before 3 December. She was on a voyage from London to Bermuda.
Franz de Paul Amersin	Flag unknown	The brig was driven ashore on Skagen.
Frederika	Denmark	The barque was driven ashore and wrecked at Starholm.
Genetiv	France	The schooner was wrecked in the Farquhar Islands before 19 December. Her crew were rescued.
George Rainy	United Kingdom	The full-rigged ship departed from Demerara, British Guiana for Liverpool. No further trace, presumed foundered with the loss of all eighteen hands.
Geronima Ghilino	Italy	The brig foundered in the Atlantic Ocean. Her crew survived. She was on a voyage from Cádiz, Spain to Montevideo, Uruguay.
Gorm	Denmark	The barque was driven ashore on Skagen. She was refloated on 20 December and assisted in to Fredrikshavn.
Harry A. Paull	United States	The schooner was wrecked on Tristan d'Acunha. Her crew survived; they were taken off the island by the schooner Edward Vittery (United Kingdom). Harry A. Paull was on a voyage from Martinique and/or Algoa Bay to Guam.
Hawk	United Kingdom	The barque was driven ashore at Blakeney, Norfolk. She was on a voyage from Sunderland to Demerara, British Guiana.
Hawk	Russia	The lighter was sunk by ice at Ochakov.
Helen	United Kingdom	The ship was driven ashore at Cherbourg, Manche, France. Her crew were rescued. She was on a voyage from Saint-Malo, Ille-et-Vilaine to Rouen.
Hellas	Germany	The brig was driven ashore at "Ariff". She was refloated and found to be leaky.
Hermod	Sweden	The steamship ran aground at "Nuberg". She was on a voyage from Newcastle upon Tyne, Northumberland, United Kingdom to Gothenburg. She was refloated.
Hero	United Kingdom	The ship was abandoned in the North Sea. She was on a voyage from Newcastle upon Tyne to Holmstadt, Norway. She was subsequently taken in to Fredrikshavn, Denmark as a derelict.
Hesperus	United Kingdom	The steamship ran aground on the Hittarp Reef, in the Baltic Sea off the coast of Sweden. She was refloated several days later.
Highflyer	United Kingdom	The ship was wrecked at Tub Harbour, Newfoundland Colony.
Hilina Frederika	Denmark	The ship ran aground at Dragør.
Hurricane	United Kingdom	The steamship ran aground "at Paternoster". She was refloated and taken in to Gothenburg in a leaky condition.
Hvok	Austria-Hungary	The barque was driven ashore at Santa Teresa.
Idea	United Kingdom	The ship foundered in the Chops of the Channel. Her crew were rescued.
Invincible	United Kingdom	The barque was abandoned in the Atlantic Ocean. Her crew were rescued by the steamship Ville de Marseille (France). Invincible was on a voyage from Pensacola, Florida, United States to Marseille.
Jane	France	The brig was abandoned in the Atlantic Ocean (46°35′N 7°13′W on or before 4 December. She sank that day.
Jane Francis	United Kingdom	The brig ran aground at Padstow, Cornwall. She was refloated.
Jevalo	(Russian Empire) Grand Duchy of Finland	The ship was wrecked on Cuttyhunk Island, Massachusetts, United States. She was on a voyage from Jakobstad to Boston, Massachusetts.
Josefina	Sweden	The barque was driven ashore on Skagen.
Julia F. Carney	United Kingdom	The ship was destroyed by fire at Loango, Kingdom of Loango. Her crew were rescued.
Lady Godiva	United Kingdom	The ship was driven ashore on Skagen.
Lady Jocelyn	United Kingdom	The brig was abandoned at sea. Her crew were rescued by the steamship Diadem (United Kingdom). Lady Jocelyn was on a voyage from Porto, Portugal to Sunderland.
Liberty	United Kingdom	The schooner was wrecked on the Adjuah Rocks, on the coast of the Cape Colony.
Lizzie Gillespie	United Kingdom	The barque was driven ashore and wrecked in the Gut of Canso. She was on a voyage from Sydney, Nova Scotia to Saint John, New Brunswick, Canada.
Lochnagar	United Kingdom	The ship was driven ashore at Macduff, Aberdeenshire.
Loretta Fish	United States	The ship ran aground at New York. She was refloated and resumed her voyage.
Lynn Regis	United Kingdom	The steamship was driven ashore and wrecked in the Îles de Glénan, Finistère. Her crew were rescued.
MacMillan	United Kingdom	The steamship ran aground in the Clyde. She was on a voyage from Glasgow, Renfrewshire to Shanghai, China.
Marie Joseph	France	The lugger was abandoned at sea. Her crew were rescued.
Michael	Sweden	The barque was driven ashore on Skagen.
Miramichi	Canada	The ship was sunk by ice at Saint John, New Brunswick.
Monitor	United Kingdom	The barque was driven ashore on Skagen.
Najade	Germany	The barque was driven ashore on Skagen.
Neptune	United Kingdom	The steamship ran aground in the Clyde.
Neptune	United Kingdom	The schooner was driven ashore in the Raz de Sein with the loss of two of her crew.
Oneta	United Kingdom	The ship was driven ashore in the Gaspar Strait. She was on a voyage from Manila, Spanish East Indies to New York. She was refloated and resumed her voyage.
Oster Meyer	Austria-Hungary	The schooner was severely damaged by ice at Otchakoff. She was declared a total loss.
Perseverant	France	The steamship was lost at sea. Her crew were rescued. She was on a voyage from Bayonne, Basses-Pyrénées to Antwerp.
Peruvian	United Kingdom	The ship was abandoned in the Atlantic Ocean before 13 December. She was on a voyage from Dublin to Philadelphia.
Peter Maxwell	United Kingdom	The ship caught fire and was scuttled in St. Mary's Bay, Newfoundland Colony.
Rankin	United Kingdom	The schooner was driven ashore at Donaghadee, County Down.
Regalia	United Kingdom	The steamship ran aground on the Cork Sand, in the North Sea off the coast of Essex. She was refloated and put in to Harwich, Essex.
Regatta	Norway	The brigantine was lost at sea. Her crew were rescued by the brigantine China (United Kingdom). Regatta was on a voyage from Maracaibo, Venezuela to Falmouth, Cornwall, United Kingdom.
Reunion	United Kingdom	The schooner was wrecked on Langlade Island. She was on a voyage from New York to the Newfoundland Colony.
Rona	Canada	The ship ran aground on the Craving Shoals. She was on a voyage from New York to London. She was refloated and resumed her voyage.
Sagunto	Spain	The steamship was abandoned at sea. She was subsequently discovered by La Flamande (France), which towed her in to Lisbon, Portugal in a derelict condition.
Santiago	Spain	The barque was lost at sea. Her crew were rescued. She was on a voyage from Madeira to Santiago, Chile.
Shamrock	United Kingdom	The steamship ran aground at Lowestoft, Suffolk. She was refloated.
Sine	Germany	The barque was loss off "Pulo Canton", Netherlands East Indies before 6 December.
Sjælland	Denmark	The steamship was driven ashore on Hiiumaa, Russia. She was on a voyage from Schiedam, South Holland, Netherlands to Reval, Russia. She was refloated in May 1880.
Sparta	United Kingdom	The steamship was forced aground by ice at Otchakoff.
Stabbestad	Norway	The barque was wrecked in the Cayman Islands. Her crew were rescued. She was on a voyage from Saint Thomas, Virgin Islands to Galveston, Texas, United States.
Sunbeam	United Kingdom	The barque was wrecked at Brunswick, Georgia, United States. She was on a voyage from Brunswick to Rio de Janeiro, Brazil.
Suvo	Sweden	The ship was driven ashore on Skagen.
Svalen	Sweden	The schooner was wrecked at Torekov. Her crew were rescued.
Sverre	Norway	The ship was wrecked at Fort Mahon, Pas-de-Calais, France with the loss of one of her nine crew. A barquentine of this name was reported to have been discovered at sea by Eliza (United Kingdom) and set afire.
The Fisher	United Kingdom	The ship was driven ashore on Skagen.
Thule	Norway	The brig was sunk by ice at Saint John, New Brunswick.
Varna	United Kingdom	The steamship was forced aground by ice at Otchakoff.
Vasconia	France	The steamship was driven ashore in the Gironde downstream of Pauillac, Gironde. She was on a voyage from the River Plate to Bordeaux, Gironde. She was refloated on 1 January 1880 and taken in to Bordeaux.
Venere	Austria-Hungary	The barque caught fire at New Orleans. She was on a voyage from New Orleans to Havre de Grâce.
Venezuela	United Kingdom	The steamship was lost.
Violette	United Kingdom	The barque was wrecked at "Lahek", Patagonia.
W. A. Scholten	Netherlands	The steamship ran aground at Maassluis. She was refloated.
W. G. Putnam	United Kingdom	The barque was driven ashore at Gibraltar. She was on a voyage from Sydney, Nova Scotia to Marseille. She subsequently sank.
Winifred	United Kingdom	The ship struck a sunken rock. She was on a voyage from Maranhão, Brazil to New Orleans. She completed her voyage in a leaky condition.
Zanone	Great Britain	The barque was wrecked at Varna, United Principalities.
Unnamed	Netherlands	The dredger was run into by the steamship Jupiter (Germany) and sank at Maassluis.
Unnamed	Fiji	The ship foundered off Bau in a cyclone with the loss of three lives.
Unnamed	United Kingdom	The fishing smack was run down in the North Sea by the steamship Ballogie (United Kingdom) and sank with then loss of all hands, about nine lives.
