= California Historical Landmarks in Plumas County =

California Historical Landmarks located in Plumas County, California are listed.

Note: The map coordinate for each historical landmark is a link to a map showing its location.

Image		Landmark name	Location	City or town	Summary
American Ranch and Hotel	479	American Ranch and Hotel	355 Main St. 39°56′13″N 120°56′43″W	Quincy	
Beckwourth Pass	336	Beckwourth Pass	Rest area, Beckwourth Pass; 39°47′30″N 120°06′28″W	Chilcoot	
Bucks Lake	197	Bucks Lake	Bucks Lake Lodge Marina; 39°52′45″N 121°10′34″W	Bucks Lake	
Elizabethtown	231	Elizabethtown	On dirt rd, 0.4 mi NW of State Hwy 70; 39°57′50″N 120°57′25″W	Quincy	
Jamison City, Eureka Mills, Johnstown, and the famous Eureka Mine	196	Jamison City, Eureka Mills, Johnstown, and the famous Eureka Mine	Plumas-Eureka State Park; 39°47′18″N 120°38′04″W	Blairsden	
Peter Lassen Marker	184	Peter Lassen Marker	North Valley Rd. 40°08′59″N 120°52′46″W	Greenville	
Upload Photo	212	Pioneer Grave	Buck's Lake Rd. 39°51′49″N 121°13′37″W	Quincy	
Upload Photo	625	Pioneer Schoolhouse	Plumas County Fairgrounds; 39°56′20″N 120°54′56″W	Quincy	
Johnsville Ski Area	723	Johnsville Ski Area	Plumas-Eureka State Park; 39°45′24″N 120°41′52″W	Blairsden	
Plumas House	480	Plumas House	Main and Court Sts. 39°56′10″N 120°56′53″W	Quincy	
Upload Photo	213	Rabbit Creek Hotel Monument	Main and Church Sts; 39°40′58″N 120°59′05″W	La Porte	
Upload Photo	337	Rich Bar	Rich Bar, on State Hwy 70; 40°00′43″N 121°11′35″W	Quincy	
Upload Photo	481	Spanish Ranch	Spanish Ranch Rd. 39°57′00″N 121°03′25″W	Spanish Ranch	

== See also ==
- List of California Historical Landmarks
- National Register of Historic Places listings in Plumas County, California
