= Pioneer Schoolhouse (Plumas, California) =

Historical Landmark in Quincy, United States

Pioneer Ski Area of America Palisades Tahoe Aerial Tram
- Location within California Location within the United States
- 39.938°N 120.915°W
- Location: Plumas County Fairgrounds; Quincy, California

California Historical Landmark
- Reference no.: 724

Pioneer School House in Quincy, California was built in 1857 by the residents of Plumas County. The School served the residents of the American Valley, a plain with an elevation of 3415 feet. American Valley is near East Quincy and Quincy Junction. Quincy Junction was the interchange of the Quincy Railroad and the Union Pacific (former Western Pacific. The Pioneer School House was the first schoolhouse in Plumas County. The schoolhouse opened with 19 students with teacher Mr. S. A. Ballou. The Plumas County Museum manages the Pioneer Schoolhouse now, the Schoolhouse was moved to the Plumas Sierra County Fairgrounds. The Pioneer Schoolhouse is open during some special events and during the Plumas-Sierra Fair in August. The Pioneer School House is a California Historical Landmark No. 724, registered on January 13, 1958. In 1957 the School House was still being used, but for kindergarten classes only.

== See also ==
- California Historical Landmarks in Plumas County
