= Plumas Rangers =

Nineteenth century Californian militia group

The Plumas Rangers, Sixth Division, First Brigade were a militia group in California, United States, founded November 24, 1855 under the seal of Judge W.T. Ward. Officers were elected at a meeting at the Saloon of Flournoy & Company in Elizabethtown on Saturday December 1, 1855.

The Rangers participated in no action other than parades and drills until conflict arose between white settlers and Pit River Indians in the Honey Lake region in 1857. With food in short supply, the local Indians harvested three acres of potatoes belonging to local rancher William Morehead. The resulting conflict became known as the Potato War. The Plumas Rangers marched to the aid of the settlers, but found the conflict already quelled by United States Army troops under Captain William Weatherlow, Captain of the Honey Lake Rangers, and Chief Winnemucca and the Paiutes, who assisted in tracking the Pit River Indians involved.

The group remained in being until at least 1861. The exact date on which the militia was dissolved is not known.
