= Quincy, California =

Quincy
- Unincorporated Community; Census Designated Place
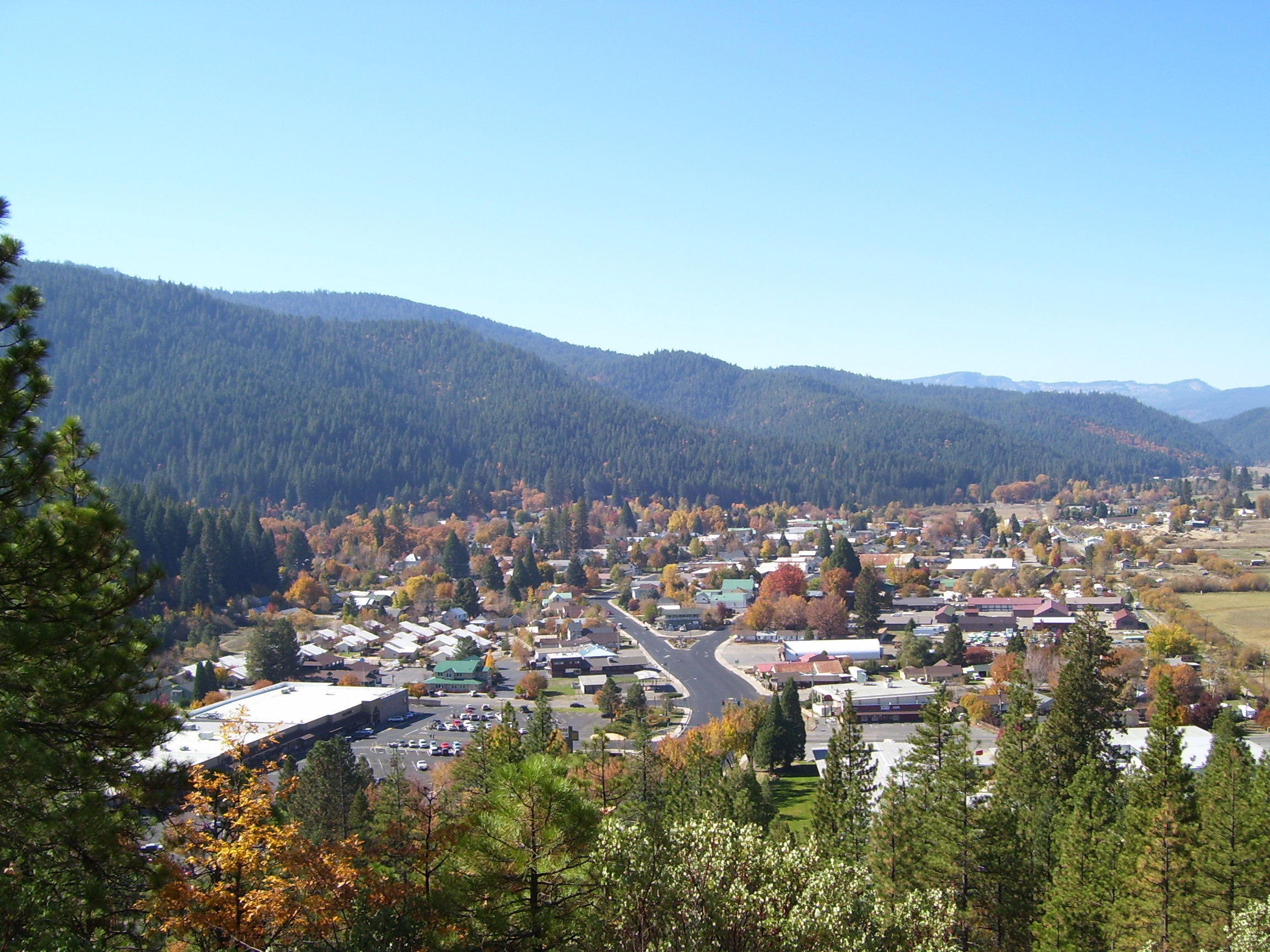
- Motto: "Heart of the Feather River Country"
- Interactive map of Quincy
- Location within California Location within the United States
- Coordinates: 39°56′11″N 120°56′53″W
- Country: United States
- State: California
- County: Plumas

Area
  - Total: 4.22 sq mi (10.94 km^{2})
  - Land: 4.22 sq mi (10.94 km^{2})
  - Water: 0 sq mi (0 km^{2}) 0%
- Elevation: 3,432 ft (1,046 m)

Population (2020)
  - Total: 1,630
  - Density: 386/sq mi (149/km^{2})
- Time zone: UTC-08:00 (PST)
  - Summer (DST): UTC-07:00 (PDT)
- ZIP code: 95971
- Area codes: 530, 837 Exchange: 283
- FIPS code: 06-59080
- GNIS feature ID: 265113
- Website: Quincy California Chamber of Commerce

Quincy (formerly Quinsy) is a census-designated place in and the county seat of Plumas County, California, United States. The population was 1,630 during the 2020 Census, down from 1,728 during the 2010 Census, and 1,879 during the 2000 Census.

== History ==
Before the settlers arrived in the area during the 1850s, it was inhabited by the Maidu tribe because of the American Valley's source of water, fertile soil and favorable weather conditions. Quincy started as a Gold Rush town, associated with the former Elizabethtown, California. Starting in 1852, Elizabethtown slowly faded.

Development moved a mile away into the American Valley after settler James H. Bradley, who helped organize Plumas County, donated land there for the county seat. He laid out the town and named it after his farm in Illinois that had been named for John Quincy Adams (1767–1848), the sixth president of the United States (1825–1829).

The Quincy post office opened in 1855, and the town was formally recognized in 1858.

== Geography and climate ==
Quincy is located at 39°56′11″N 120°56′53″W (39.936279, −120.947921).

According to the United States Census Bureau, the CDP has a total area of 4.2 square miles (11 km^{2}), all land.

Quincy is underlain by metasedimentary rock of the Shoo Fly Complex. Its dominant silica-rich clastic material weathers to a stony coarse soil which includes the well or somewhat excessively drained alluvial fan material (mainly Forgay very gravelly sandy loam) on which most of Quincy's businesses and homes have been built. Cultivated land north of the residential area lies on poorly drained loam, silt loam or fine sandy loam.

Quincy has a Mediterranean climate (Köppen Csb) though its inland location and altitude makes it more continental and wetter than usual for this type, with very heavy snowfalls sometimes occurring in winter – the record being 133 inches (337.8 cm) in the very wet January 1916. Although summer days are hot and only 1.4 days per winter fail to top 32 °F (0 °C), nights can be very cold and frosts occur on 179 days per year and have been recorded even in July.

Climate data for Quincy, California, 1991–2020 normals, extremes 1895–present
| Month | Jan | Feb | Mar | Apr | May | Jun | Jul | Aug | Sep | Oct | Nov | Dec | Year |
|---|---|---|---|---|---|---|---|---|---|---|---|---|---|
| Record high °F (°C) | 74 (23) | 80 (27) | 85 (29) | 89 (32) | 100 (38) | 105 (41) | 111 (44) | 111 (44) | 110 (43) | 98 (37) | 86 (30) | 76 (24) | 111 (44) |
| Mean maximum °F (°C) | 57.6 (14.2) | 64.4 (18.0) | 73.4 (23.0) | 81.1 (27.3) | 89.2 (31.8) | 96.0 (35.6) | 100.7 (38.2) | 100.2 (37.9) | 95.3 (35.2) | 85.4 (29.7) | 68.3 (20.2) | 56.3 (13.5) | 102.6 (39.2) |
| Mean daily maximum °F (°C) | 43.9 (6.6) | 49.9 (9.9) | 56.3 (13.5) | 62.3 (16.8) | 70.7 (21.5) | 80.2 (26.8) | 89.0 (31.7) | 88.1 (31.2) | 82.4 (28.0) | 69.1 (20.6) | 52.3 (11.3) | 43.0 (6.1) | 65.6 (18.7) |
| Daily mean °F (°C) | 34.5 (1.4) | 38.0 (3.3) | 42.6 (5.9) | 47.1 (8.4) | 54.7 (12.6) | 61.8 (16.6) | 68.3 (20.2) | 66.6 (19.2) | 61.1 (16.2) | 50.9 (10.5) | 40.3 (4.6) | 34.2 (1.2) | 50.0 (10.0) |
| Mean daily minimum °F (°C) | 25.2 (−3.8) | 26.1 (−3.3) | 28.9 (−1.7) | 32.0 (0.0) | 38.6 (3.7) | 43.3 (6.3) | 47.7 (8.7) | 45.1 (7.3) | 39.8 (4.3) | 32.6 (0.3) | 28.4 (−2.0) | 25.4 (−3.7) | 34.4 (1.3) |
| Mean minimum °F (°C) | 14.7 (−9.6) | 17.0 (−8.3) | 20.7 (−6.3) | 24.1 (−4.4) | 29.7 (−1.3) | 34.7 (1.5) | 40.4 (4.7) | 37.9 (3.3) | 32.0 (0.0) | 24.0 (−4.4) | 17.7 (−7.9) | 13.7 (−10.2) | 9.8 (−12.3) |
| Record low °F (°C) | −24 (−31) | −16 (−27) | 0 (−18) | 12 (−11) | 20 (−7) | 25 (−4) | 23 (−5) | 20 (−7) | 15 (−9) | 10 (−12) | −3 (−19) | −24 (−31) | −24 (−31) |
| Average precipitation inches (mm) | 7.65 (194) | 7.59 (193) | 6.66 (169) | 3.14 (80) | 1.94 (49) | 0.71 (18) | 0.10 (2.5) | 0.14 (3.6) | 0.42 (11) | 1.94 (49) | 4.06 (103) | 7.32 (186) | 41.67 (1,058.1) |
| Average snowfall inches (cm) | 5.8 (15) | 7.6 (19) | 5.4 (14) | 1.6 (4.1) | 0.0 (0.0) | 0.0 (0.0) | 0.0 (0.0) | 0.0 (0.0) | 0.0 (0.0) | 0.1 (0.25) | 1.7 (4.3) | 6.2 (16) | 28.4 (72.65) |
| Average precipitation days (≥ 0.01 inch) | 12.0 | 11.1 | 12.0 | 9.1 | 6.7 | 3.1 | 0.6 | 0.9 | 1.6 | 5.1 | 8.3 | 12.2 | 82.7 |
| Average snowy days (≥ 0.1 in) | 2.6 | 2.4 | 1.9 | 0.8 | 0.0 | 0.0 | 0.0 | 0.0 | 0.0 | 0.1 | 0.7 | 2.4 | 10.9 |
Source 1: NOAA
Source 2: National Weather Service

== Demographics ==
Historical population
| Census | Pop. | Note | %± |
|---|---|---|---|
| 2000 | 1,879 | | — |
| 2010 | 1,728 | | −8.0% |
| 2020 | 1,630 | | −5.7% |
U.S. Decennial Census; 1860–1870 1880-1890; 1900 1910 1920; 1930 1940 1950; 1960 1970 1980; 1990 2000 2010

Quincy first appeared as a census designated place in the 2000 U.S. census created from part of deleted Quincy-East Quincy CDP.

=== Racial and ethnic composition ===
Quincy CDP, California – Racial and ethnic composition Note: the US Census treats Hispanic/Latino as an ethnic category. This table excludes Latinos from the racial categories and assigns them to a separate category. Hispanics/Latinos may be of any race.
| Race / Ethnicity (NH = Non-Hispanic) | Pop 2000 | Pop 2010 | Pop 2020 | % 2000 | % 2010 | % 2020 |
|---|---|---|---|---|---|---|
| White alone (NH) | 1,665 | 1,441 | 1,335 | 88.61% | 83.39% | 81.90% |
| Black or African American alone (NH) | 29 | 35 | 24 | 1.54% | 2.03% | 1.47% |
| Native American or Alaska Native alone (NH) | 35 | 25 | 15 | 1.86% | 1.45% | 0.92% |
| Asian alone (NH) | 14 | 19 | 14 | 0.75% | 1.10% | 0.86% |
| Native Hawaiian or Pacific Islander alone (NH) | 2 | 2 | 0 | 0.11% | 0.12% | 0.00% |
| Other race alone (NH) | 6 | 6 | 21 | 0.32% | 0.35% | 1.29% |
| Mixed race or Multiracial (NH) | 38 | 68 | 104 | 2.02% | 3.94% | 6.38% |
| Hispanic or Latino (any race) | 90 | 132 | 117 | 4.79% | 7.64% | 7.18% |
| Total | 1,879 | 1,728 | 1,630 | 100.00% | 100.00% | 100.00% |

=== 2020 census ===
As of the 2020 census, Quincy had a population of 1,630. The population density was 385.9 inhabitants per square mile (149.0/km^{2}). The median age was 42.5 years. 20.2% of residents were under the age of 18 and 23.4% were 65 years of age or older. For every 100 females, there were 88.9 males, and for every 100 females age 18 and over, there were 87.1 males age 18 and over.

The racial makeup of Quincy was 1,382 (84.8%) White, 25 (1.5%) African American, 18 (1.1%) Native American, 14 (0.9%) Asian, 1 (0.1%) Pacific Islander, 46 (2.8%) from other races, and 144 (8.8%) from two or more races. Hispanic or Latino of any race were 117 persons (7.2%).

The census reported that 1,571 people (96.4% of the population) lived in households, 25 (1.5%) lived in non-institutionalized group quarters, and 34 (2.1%) were institutionalized.

There were 761 households, out of which 174 (22.9%) had children under the age of 18 living in them, 254 (33.4%) were married-couple households, 55 (7.2%) were cohabiting couple households, 257 (33.8%) had a female householder with no partner present, and 195 (25.6%) had a male householder with no partner present. 330 households (43.4%) were one person, and 135 (17.7%) were one person aged 65 or older. The average household size was 2.06. There were 371 families (48.8% of all households).

There were 874 housing units at an average density of 206.9 units per square mile (79.9 units/km^{2}), of which 761 (87.1%) were occupied. Of these, 375 (49.3%) were owner-occupied, and 386 (50.7%) were occupied by renters. 12.9% of housing units were vacant; the homeowner vacancy rate was 3.1%, and the rental vacancy rate was 5.4%.

0.0% of residents lived in urban areas, while 100.0% lived in rural areas.

=== Income and poverty ===
In 2023, the US Census Bureau estimated that the median household income was $87,008, and the per capita income was $47,184. About 0.0% of families and 12.1% of the population were below the poverty line.

=== 2010 census ===
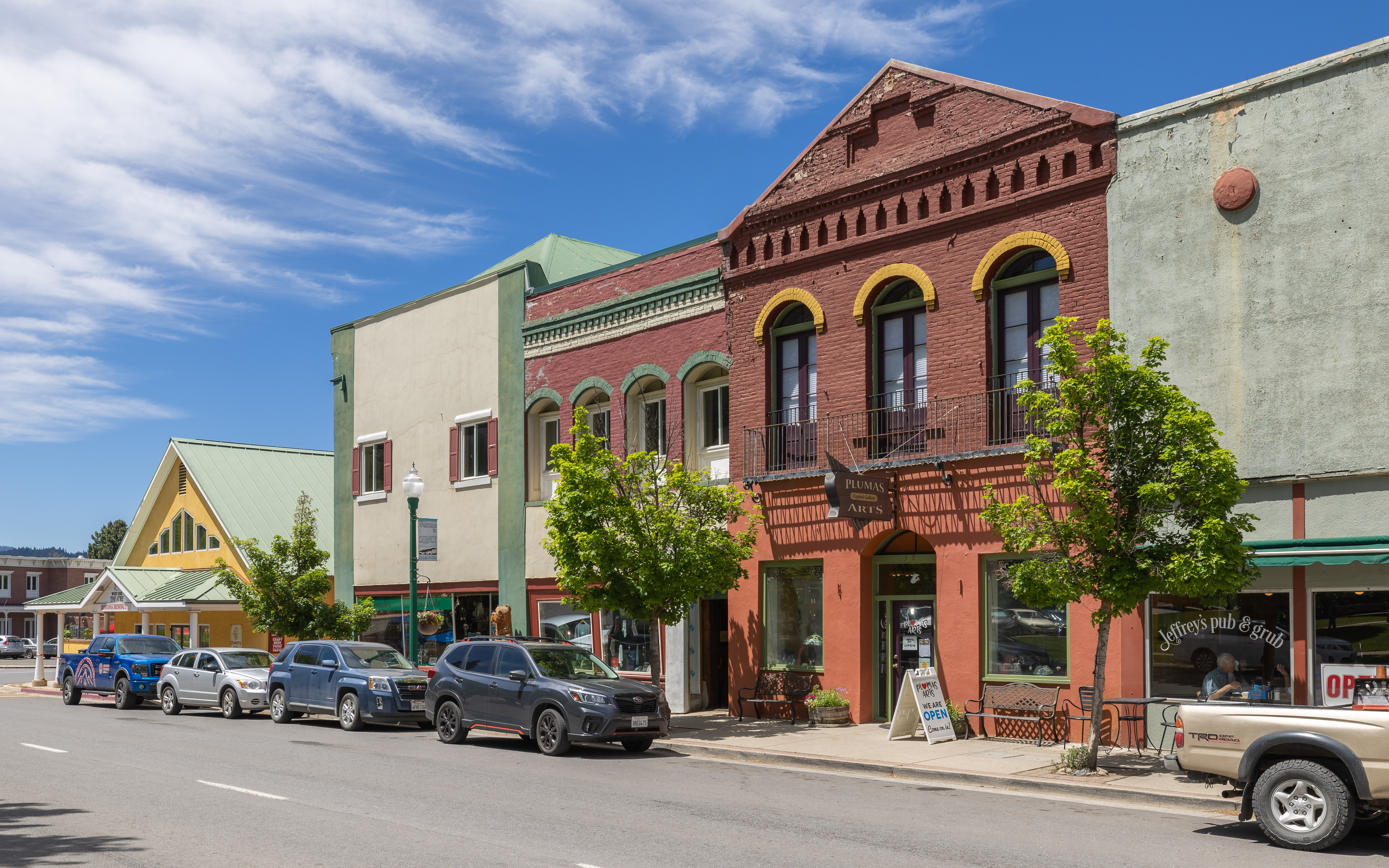
Main street in Quincy (May 2022)

At the 2010 census Quincy had a population of 1,728. The population density was 407.6 inhabitants per square mile (157.4/km^{2}). The racial makeup of Quincy was 1,500 (86.8%) White, 132 (7.6%) Hispanic or Latino of any race, 37 (2.1%) Black, 29 (1.7%) Native American, 19 (1.1%) Asian, 2 (0.1%) Pacific Islander, 66 (3.8%) from other races, and 75 (4.3%) from two or more races.

The census reported that 1,673 people (96.8% of the population) lived in households, no one lived in non-institutionalized group quarters and 55 (3.2%) were institutionalized.

There were 798 households, 183 (22.9%) had children under the age of 18 living in them, 300 (37.6%) were opposite-sex married couples living together, 85 (10.7%) had a female householder with no husband present, 28 (3.5%) had a male householder with no wife present. There were 63 (7.9%) unmarried opposite-sex partnerships, and 5 (0.6%) same-sex married couples or partnerships. 314 households (39.3%) were one person and 93 (11.7%) had someone living alone who was 65 or older. The average household size was 2.10. There were 413 families (51.8% of households); the average family size was 2.77.

The age distribution was 341 people (19.7%) under the age of 18, 163 people (9.4%) aged 18 to 24, 350 people (20.3%) aged 25 to 44, 556 people (32.2%) aged 45 to 64, and 318 people (18.4%) who were 65 or older. The median age was 45.5 years. For every 100 females, there were 84.2 males. For every 100 females age 18 and over, there were 81.1 males.

There were 872 housing units at an average density of 205.7 per square mile, of the occupied units 388 (48.6%) were owner-occupied and 410 (51.4%) were rented. The homeowner vacancy rate was 2.7%; the rental vacancy rate was 5.5%. 872 people (50.5% of the population) lived in owner-occupied housing units and 801 people (46.4%) lived in rental housing units.

== Education ==
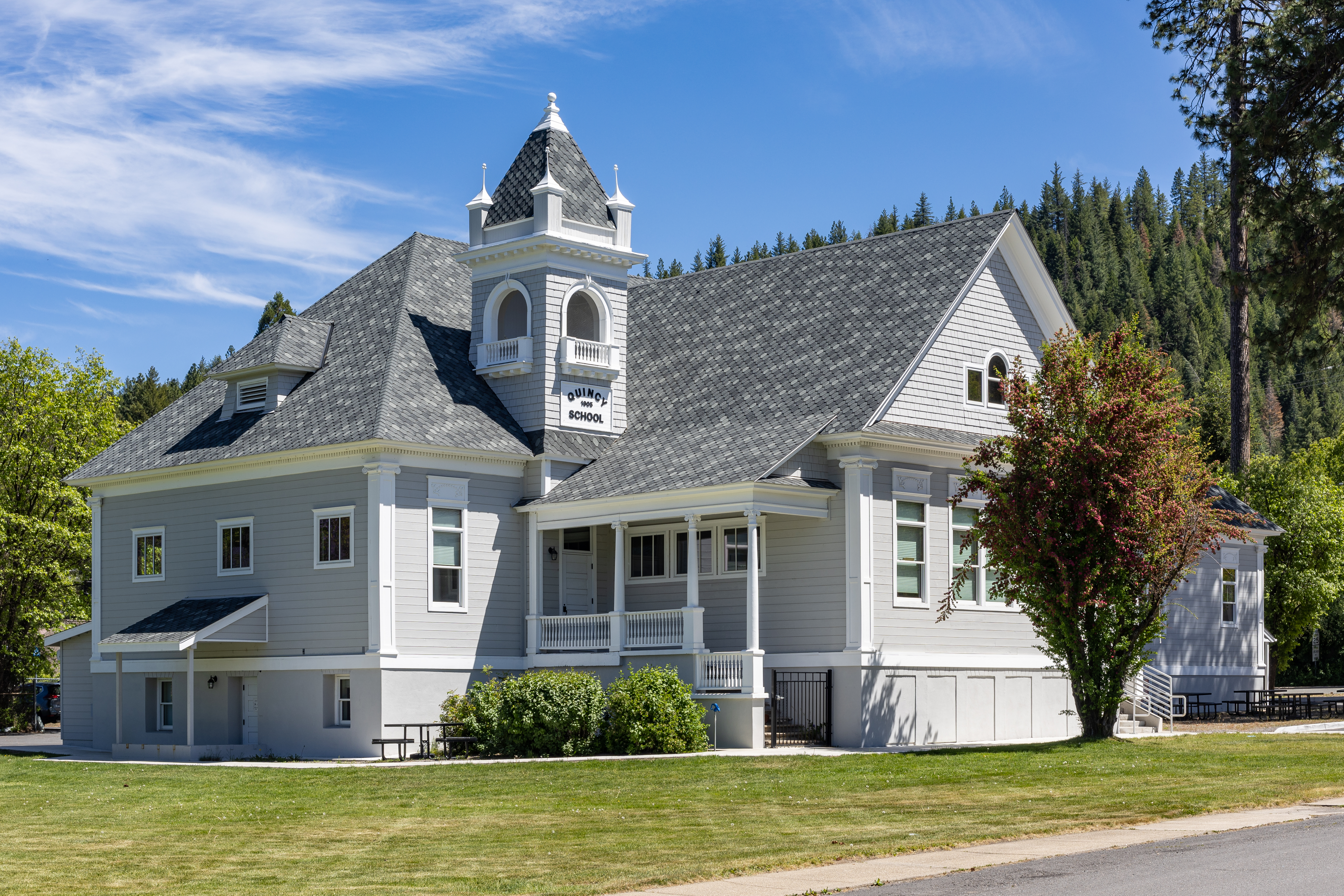
The 1905 historic schoolhouse in downtown Quincy

Quincy is in the Plumas Unified School District. Quincy's students attend the Quincy Elementary School and Quincy Junior-Senior High School. The 'Trojans' are the mascot for the Quincy Junior-Senior High School.

Quincy is also home to Feather River College, a public community college.

== Government ==
In the California State Legislature, Quincy is in the 1st senatorial district, represented by Republican Megan Dahle, and in the 1st Assembly district, represented by Republican Heather Hadwick. Federally, Quincy is in California's 3rd congressional district, represented by Independent Kevin Kiley.

== Notable people ==
- Cody Anderson, MLB pitcher for the Cleveland Indians
- Craig Brandt, member of the New Mexico Senate
- Louise Clappe, known as Dame Shirley; diarist who settled in Quincy during the Gold Rush; the town square is named for her
- Jason Ellison, former MLB outfielder
- Claire Cayot O'Rourke, supercentenarian and the first woman to hold public office in the state of California
- Ulysses S. Webb, 19th Attorney General of California

== Historical Landmarks ==
- Quincy Pioneer Grave
- American Ranch and Hotel
- Elizabethtown
- Pioneer Schoolhouse
- Plumas House
- Rich Bar
- Plumas County Museum

== See also ==
- California Historical Landmarks in Plumas County
- East Quincy, California
- Quincy Railroad
- Plumas County Superior Court
- Gansner Field
- Plumas National Forest
- High Sierra Music Festival
