= Plumas House =

Historical Landmark in Quincy, United States

- Plumas House

- Location within California Location within the United States
- 39.936°N 120.948°W
- Location: Quincy, California

History
- Built: 1866

California Historical Landmark
- Reference no.: 480

Plumas House was a historical building in Quincy, California. The site of the Plumas House building is a California Historical Landmark No. 480. The first building at the site was built in 1853. The second building that replaced the original was built by James and Jane Edwards in 1866. The Edwards building was a Hotel with a Ballroom, restaurant, and parlor. The Hotel caught fire on June 23, 1923, with no hope to save it. The fire did not spread to other buildings with the help of the volunteer fire department. The two buildings served the town and the 49er California Gold Rush miners. The town of Quincy was named by James Bradley after his hometown of Quincy, Illinois. The Plumas House was busy, as Quincy was the county seat for Plumas County. A historical marker is in the town center park at the Southwest corner of Main Street and Court Street.

Plumas House seating room on January 12, 1893

== See also ==
- California Historical Landmarks in Plumas County
