= American Ranch =

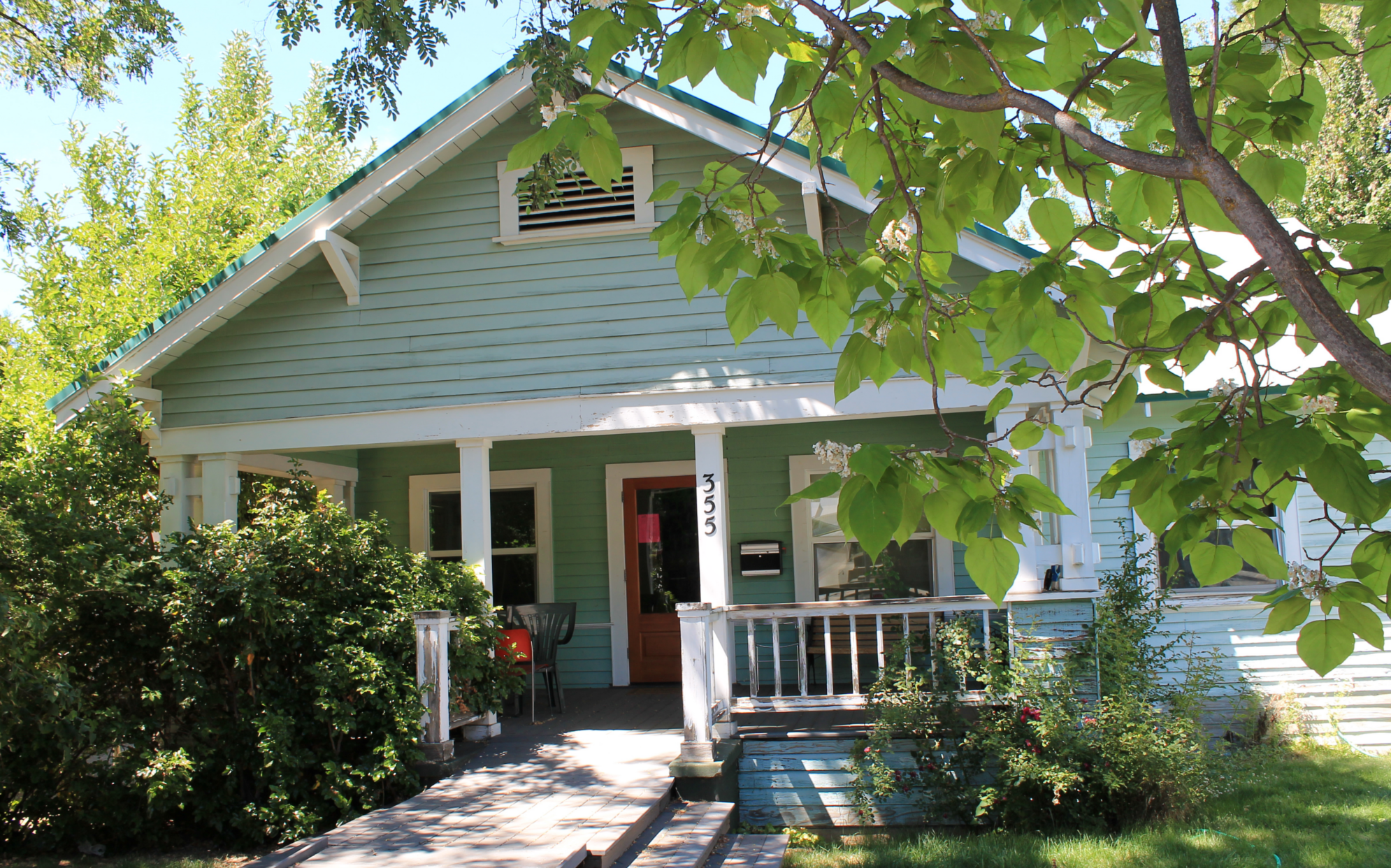
- The building's exterior in 2014
- Interactive map of American Ranch
- Coordinates: 39.93691°N 120.94535°W
- Country: United States
- State: California
- County: Plumas County
- Elevation: 3,428 ft (1,045 m)

California Historical Landmark
- Reference no.: 479

The American Ranch on the Beckwourth Trail, was a 160-acre farm and lodging house located in the American Valley, now Quincy, California.

The American Ranch and Hotel was founded in 1852 by H.J. Bradley. The structure has the distinction of being the first in the area constructed of sawn lumber. It served as the county seat during the founding of Plumas County in 1854.

The 160 acre ranch was owned and operated by James Haun from 1856 to 1876.

The hotel is located at 355 Main Street and has been designated with a California Historical Landmark marker No. 479.

== See also ==
- California Historical Landmarks in Plumas County
