= Quincy Railroad (California) =

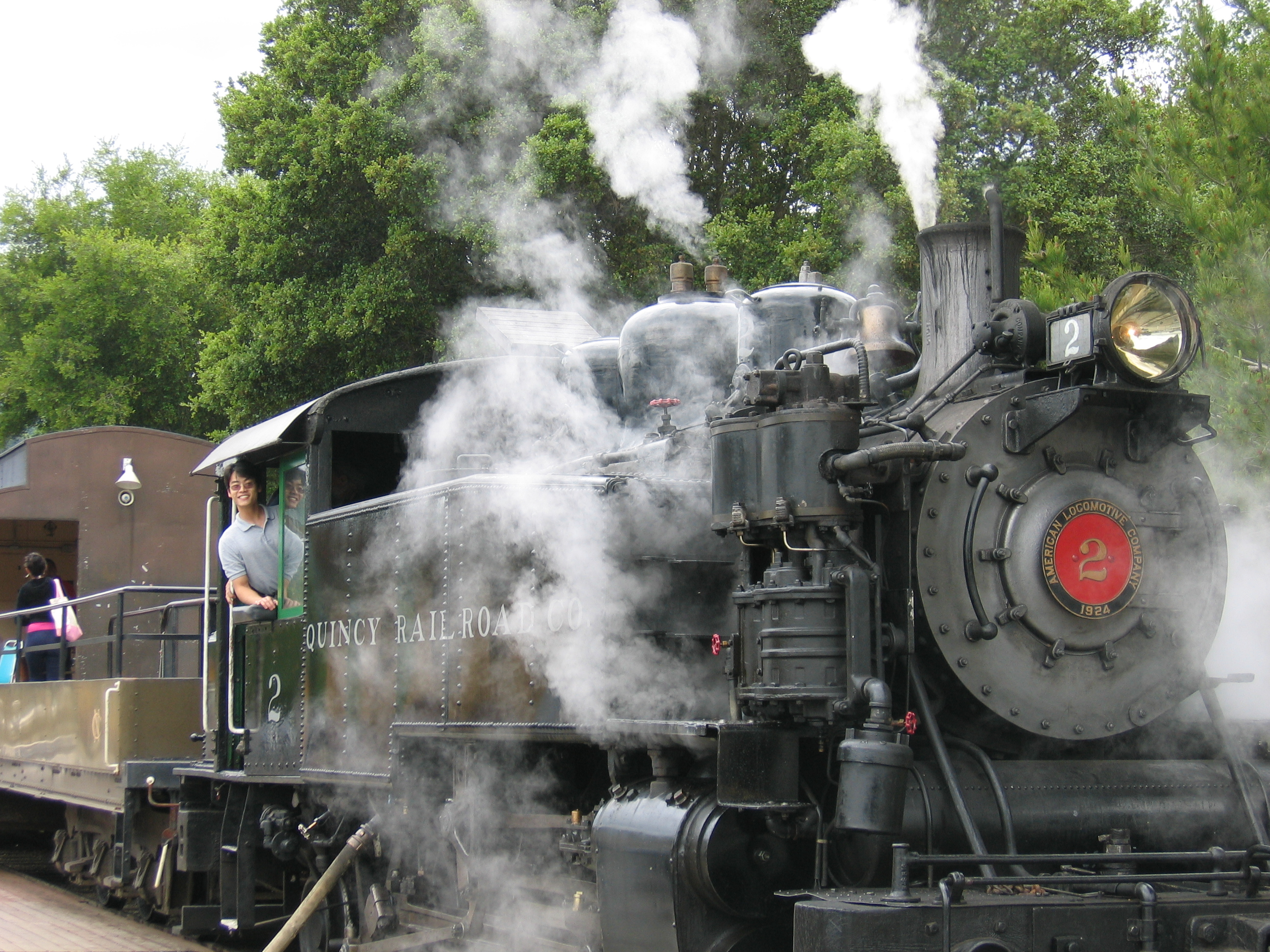
- QRR #2 in 2005.

Overview
- Headquarters: Quincy, California
- Reporting mark: QRR
- Locale: Quincy and Susanville, California
- Dates of operation: November 9, 1917–present

Technical
- Track gauge: 4 ft 8 1/2 in (1,435 mm) standard gauge

The Quincy Railroad (reporting mark QRR) is a 3.27-mile terminal railroad located at Quincy, California. The QRR interchanges with the Union Pacific (former Western Pacific) at Quincy Junction in Plumas County, California, United States.

== History ==
The Quincy Railroad began as the "Quincy Western Railroad" in 1909. This company acquired the assets of the "Quincy and Eastern Railroad", which went defunct shortly after its incorporation in 1908. Construction began in 1909, with the plans calling for a connection between the Western Pacific Railroad's station at Hartwell (later renamed to Quincy Junction), and the city of Quincy, a distance of about 7 miles. The railroad operated for over a decade, mostly hauling freight, such as lumber, but also providing passenger service to Quincy Junction. This was until the Board of Directors decided to discontinue service in 1917.

On November 10, 1917 the Quincy Railroad filed for articles of incorporation, taking over the old Quincy Western Railroad. A fire would destroy the railroad's one operating steam locomotive along with its roundhouse in November 1919, forcing it to utilize a gasoline engine.

For many years, the Quincy operated a separate 23.3 mile branch running over former Southern Pacific branch from Wendel-Susanville, California which is now abandoned.

== Modern Operations ==
The railroad currently handles over 1,000 cars per year of outbound lumber and forest products. The QRR is owned by Sierra Pacific Industries, which has a sawmill in Quincy.

The QRR has two locomotives:

- QRR 5 is an EMD SW1200 built in November 1950 (Builder No. 13459)
- QRR 12 is an EMD SW7

Three earlier Quincy locomotives are now located at the nearby Western Pacific Railroad Museum:

- QRR 3 (a GE 44-ton switcher)
- QRR 4 (an ALCO S-1)
- QRR 1100 (an EMD TR6A)

Another earlier Quincy locomotive is displayed at the Niles Canyon Railway

- QRR 2 (an ALCO 2-6-2T)
