= Nelson Point =

Nelson Point is a former settlement originally created in the Quartz Township of Butte County, California, which later became Plumas County, California. It was a thriving Gold Rush era mining camp, and one of the largest and most important communities in the region.

Prospectors first reached Nelson Creek in early 1850. A miner called "Nelson" was credited with the discovery. The camp was established at the bottom of a rugged gorge located at 39.860449°N 120.8541172°W. Later in 1850, two significant trails had been established and the population began to swell: one, from Marysville to Onion Valley via Nelson Point. The other was Bidwell's Bar to Buck's Ranch via Spanish Ranch.

Lode mines kept the area prosperous through the 1880s, but eventually the community dwindled. When the Pauly Hotel burned in 1924, mail delivery to the town ceased. Nelson Point eventually faded into a ghost town.
