= Diamondville, California =

Human settlement in United States of America

Diamondville
- Former settlement
- Location in California
- Coordinates: 39°45′35″N 121°40′30″W
- Country: United States
- State: California
- County: Butte

Diamondville (also, Rich Bar and Goatville) is a former settlement in Butte County, California, United States. It was located 4 miles (6.4 km) west of Paradise. The town was named for James Diamond. In the 1870s, Diamondville was on the stage coach route to Chico, 11 miles (18 km) distant; fares averaged 10 cents per mile. Cretaceous fossils were reported to be found from Butte Creek below Diamondville. In an 1884 report published by the United States government on the production of precious metals in the United States, Diamondville was described as "an old mining town . . . occupied by one or two ranchers and only mined by Chinese."
