= Elizabethtown, California =

Elizabethtown
- Former settlement
- California Historical Landmark marker at the site of the former town
- Interactive map of Elizabethtown
- Coordinates: 39.963839°N 120.957081°W
- Country: United States
- State: California
- County: Plumas County

California Historical Landmark
- Reference no.: 231

Elizabethtown, California was a California Gold Rush town established in 1852 in Plumas County, California. It was named after Elizabeth Stark, who was known to local miners.

The value of gold taken from the Elizabethtown area is believed to be in the millions of dollars, beginning with other gold mining camps in and around American Valley (where Quincy, CA is now located).

In 1852, a wagon train that included 10-15 families came over Beckwourth Pass (named for James Beckwourth, one of the first pioneers in the area). They brought a large supply of horses, oxen, cows, and supplies, and were among the first European settlers in American Valley. Upon their arrival, they met a population of hundreds of Maidu Indians, who were peaceful and friendly.

In 1852 Alexander and Frank Tate discovered gold in what is known as Tate ravine. Later, Lewis Stark, Peter Day, and George Ferrier went to Elizabeth ravine one morning, and by noon, they had panned out an ounce of gold. After dinner they found several ounces using a rocker. After digging a small ditch, they discovered one 28 ounce gold nugget.

Soon, many miners came to search for gold, leading to the development of the village of Elizabethtown, which was later known as Betysburg after a rivalry with nearby Quincy.

The winter of 1852-1853 was harsh, and provisions were low. In the spring of 1853, the Stark family went to Sacramento Valley and returned with cattle to provide meat for the starving families.

In 1854, a Masonic Lodge was built in Elizabethtown, and a post office was established with Lewis Stark as Postmaster. W.A. Blakesley was the Deputy and used his house as the office. In January, 1855, the post office was moved to Quincy.

The rich mining claims of 1853 and 1854 were: The Wahoo, by Joseph Kelley & Co.; Fowler, by Fowler & Co.; Varner, by Varner & Co.; Plumas, by L.F. Cate & Co.; O'Neill, by Captain O'Neill; Gloyd, by D.J. Gloyd; and Betsy Guilch, by Stark & Co.

The population of Elizabethtown rose to 2000-2500 people between 1853 and 1856. Over 30 county licenses were issued for businesses in the area during the first year that business licenses were available. The main street extended across the entire town. There were many stores, two-story buildings, saloons, gambling houses, shops, gilded palaces, lodging houses, and eating houses. They also had a lodge for the Sons of Temperance (see Temperance movement) which had over 200 members.

In 1857 and 1858, there was some demoralization within the town due to competition from the Comstock mines in Virginia City, Nevada (see Comstock Lode). Many residents moved to Indian and Honey Lake valleys. Many buildings were moved to Quincy and rebuilt there. Slowly, Elizabethtown dissolved into history.

After the "New Year's Flood" in January, 1997, a local resident discovered the cobblestone corner of a foundation had been exposed by the high water flow through the creek bed. The former excavations of the brick foundation have been covered over and are no longer visible.

There is a stone and metal monument to the town, placed by the Native Sons and Daughters of Quincy and dated September 9, 1927.

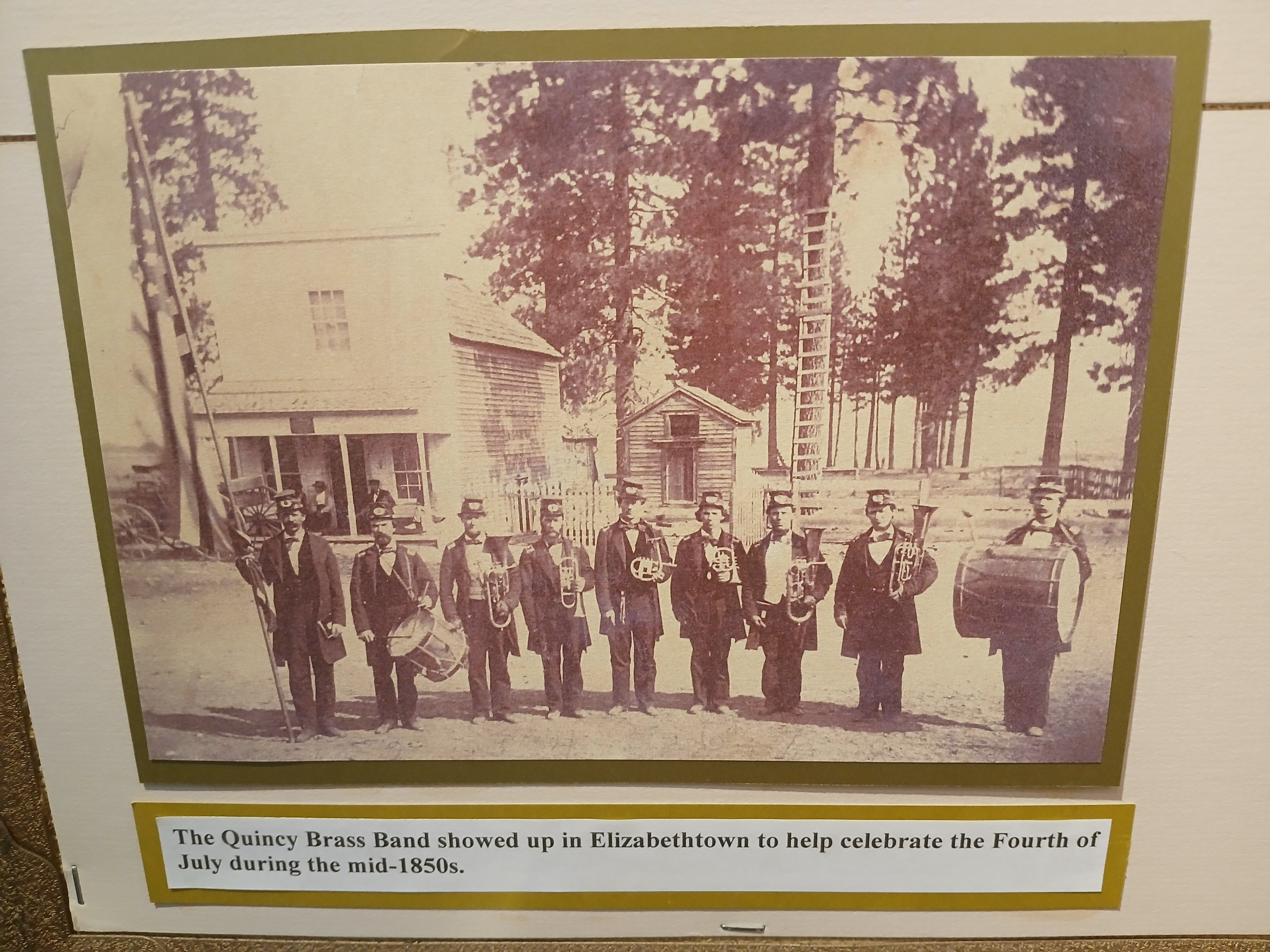
Quincy Brass Band in Elizabethtown for 4th of July Celebration in mid-1850's.
