= List of places in the United States named after people =

Many United States placenames are derived either from a person who may have been associated with the founding of the place, or in honor of a notable person. If there is no citation for a place on this list, its etymology is usually described and referenced in the article about the person or the place.

== A ==
- Aaronsburg, Pennsylvania – Aaron Levy (founder)
- Abbot, Maine – John Abbot (treasurer of Bowdoin College)
- Abbott, Texas – Joseph "Jo" Abbott (politician)
- Abbottstown, Pennsylvania – John Abbott (founder)
- Abernathy, Texas – Monroe Abernathy (one of the developers of the town)
- Abington, Massachusetts – Anne Venables Bertie, Countess of Abington, Cambridgeshire
- Ableman, Wisconsin – S.V.R. Ableman (settler)
- Ackley, Iowa – J.W. Ackley (founder)
- Acworth, New Hampshire – Jacob Acworth (British naval officer)
- Ada Township, Michigan – Ada Smith (daughter of postmaster)
- Adairville, Kentucky – John Adair (governor of Kentucky)
- Adams, California – Charles Adams (landowner)
- Adams, Massachusetts – Samuel Adams
- Adams, Nebraska – J.O. Adams (settler)
- Adams, New York – John Adams
- Adams, Oregon – John F. Adams (homesteader)
- Adams, Tennessee – Reuben Adams (landowner)
- Adamsboro, Indiana – George E. Adams (founder)
- Adamsburg, Pennsylvania – John Adams
- Adams Station, California – Marie Adams Peacock (tavern owner)
- Adamstown, California – George Adams (founder)
- Adamstown, Pennsylvania – John Adams
- Adamsville, Arizona – Charles S. Adams (original settler)
- Addison, 4 places in Maine, New York, Pennsylvania, and Vermont – Joseph Addison (English essayist, poet, playwright and politician)
- Addison, West Virginia – Addison McLaughlin (local lawyer)
- Adin, California – Adin McDowell (founder)
- Adrian, Michigan – Roman Emperor Hadrian
- Adrian, Minnesota – Mrs. Adrian Iselin (mother of Adrian C. Iselin, a director of the Sioux City and St. Paul Railroad Company)
- Aguilar, Colorado – José Ramón Aguilar (cattleman and pioneer)
- Aiken, South Carolina – William Aiken Jr. (governor of South Carolina)
- Ainsworth, Iowa – D.H. Ainsworth (civil engineer)
- Ainsworth, Washington – J.C. Ainsworth (railroader)
- Albany, New Hampshire – James of York and Albany (indirectly, via Albany, New York)
- Albany, New York – James of York and Albany
- Albemarle, North Carolina – George Monck, 1st Duke of Albemarle
- Alberhill, California – C.H. Albers, James and George Hill (landowners)
- Albert Lea, Minnesota – Albert Miller Lea (engineer, soldier, and topographer with the United States Dragoons)
- Alberton, Montana – Albert J. Earling (president of the Chicago, Milwaukee, St. Paul and Pacific Railroad)
- Albuquerque, New Mexico – Francisco Fernández de la Cueva, 8th Duke of Alburquerque
- Alburgh, Vermont – Ira Allen (landowner)
- Alcester, South Dakota – Colonel Alcester of the British army
- Alden, California – S.E. Alden (farmer and landowner)
- Alden, Iowa – Henry Alden (settler)
- Alderson, West Virginia – John Alderson (settler and local minister)
- Alexander, New York – Alexander Rea (settler and state senator)
- Alexander, Maine – Alexander Baring, 1st Baron Ashburton
- Alexandria, Nebraska – S.J. Alexander (secretary of state)
- Alexandria, New York and Alexandria Bay, New York – Alexander Le Ray (son of local settler)
- Alexandria, New Hampshire – John Alexander (indirectly, via Alexandria, Virginia)
- Alexandria, South Dakota – Alexander Mitchell (railroad president)
- Alexandria, Virginia – John Alexander (settler)
- Alford, Massachusetts – Colonel John Alford
- Alfordsville, Indiana – James Alford (settler)
- Alfred, Maine – King Alfred the Great
- Alger, Ohio – Russell A. Alger
- Alice, Texas – Alice Gertrudis King Kleberg (daughter of Richard King, who established the King Ranch)
- Allendale, Oakland, California – Charles E. Allen (real estate broker)
- Allendale, South Carolina – Allen family (settlers)
- Allenstown, New Hampshire – Samuel Allen (father of landowner and governor of New Hampshire)
- Allentown, Georgia – J.W. Allen (postmaster)
- Allentown, Pennsylvania – William Allen
- Alloway Township, New Jersey – Chief Alloway
- Alma, Colorado – Alma James (wife of local merchant)
- Almont, Michigan – Juan Almonte
- Alstead, New Hampshire – Johann Heinrich Alsted (compiled an early encyclopedia that was popular at Harvard College) (note spelling)
- Altheimer, Arkansas – Joseph and Louis Altheimer (founders)
- Alton, California – Alton Easton (indirectly, via Alton, Illinois)
- Alton, Illinois – Alton Easton (son of founder Rufus Easton)
- Alva, Florida – Thomas Alva Edison (inventor)
- Alvarado, California – Juan Alvarado (Mexican governor of California)
- Alvin, Texas – Alvin Morgan (settler)
- Alys Beach - Alys Robinson Stephens (1910-1996)
- Amador City, California – Jose Maria Amador (early gold prospector)
- Ambler, Pennsylvania – Joseph Ambler (settler)
- Amelia Court House, Virginia – Princess Amelia of Great Britain
- Ames, Iowa – Oakes Ames
- Ames, New York – Fisher Ames
- Amherst, New Hampshire -- Jeffery Amherst, 1st Baron Amherst (also Massachusetts and Maine)
- Anaheim, California – Saint Anne (indirectly, via the Santa Ana River)
- Anastasia Island, Florida – Saint Anastasia
- Anderson, Indiana – Chief William Anderson
- Anderson, South Carolina – Gen. Robert Anderson
- Andersonia, California – Jeff Anderson (sawmill owner)
- Andrade, California – Mexican General Guillermo Andrade
- Angelica, New York – Angelica Schuyler Church
- Angels Camp, California – Henry P. Angel (early settler and merchant)
- Ankeny, Iowa – John Fletcher Ankeny
- Anna, Illinois – Anna Davis (landowner's wife)
- Annapolis, Maryland – Anne, Queen of Great Britain
- Ann Arbor, Michigan – Ann Allen and Ann Rumsey (settlers' wives)
- Anniston, Alabama - Annie Scott Tyler (1893–1980), daughter of railroad president Alfred L. Tyler
- Annsville, New York – Ann Bloomfield (settler's wife)
- Anson, Maine – George Anson, 1st Baron Anson
- Anson, Wisconsin - Anson Burlingame (abolitionist, legislator, diplomat)
- Ansonia, Connecticut – Anson Greene Phelps
- Ansted, West Virginia – David T. Ansted (geologist and landowner)
- Antis Township, Pennsylvania – Frederick Antes (colonel who fought during the Revolutionary War) (note spelling)
- Anthony, Kansas – George T. Anthony (7th Governor of Kansas)
- Applebachsville, Pennsylvania – Gen. Paul Applebach
- Applegate, California – Lisbon Applegate (early settler)
- Appleton, Maine and Appleton, Wisconsin – Samuel Appleton (father-in-law of Amos Lawrence, founder of Lawrence University)
- Appling, Georgia – Col. Dan Appling
- Arbuckle, California – Tacitus R. Arbuckle (early landowner and settler)
- Archdale, North Carolina – John Archdale
- Arco, Idaho – Georg von Arco
- Arenzville, Illinois – Francis A. Arenz (founder)
- Arietta, New York – Arietta Rensselaer (wife of Rensselaer van Rensselaer)
- Arlington, Texas – Henry Bennet, 1st Earl of Arlington (indirectly, via Arlington House, The Robert E. Lee Memorial)
- Armourdale, Kansas – Armour brothers (founders of Armour and Company)
- Arnold, California – Bob and Bernice Arnold (early local merchants)
- Arnold Heights, California – General Henry H. Arnold
- Arundel, Maine – Lord Arundel
- Arvada, Colorado – Hiram Arvada Haskin (brother-in-law of settler Mary Wadsworth)
- Arvin, California – Arvin Richardson (1883-1978), pioneer
- Asbury Park, New Jersey – Francis Asbury
- Ashburnham, Massachusetts – John Ashburnham, 2nd Earl of Ashburnham
- Ashbyburg, Kentucky – Gen. Stephen Ashby
- Asheboro, North Carolina – Samuel Ashe (governor of North Carolina)
- Asherville, Indiana – John Asher (founder)
- Ashford, Alabama – Thomas Ashford
- Ashley, Michigan – H.W. Ashley (manager of the Ann Arbor Railroad)
- Ashley River (South Carolina) – Anthony Ashley Cooper, 1st Earl of Shaftesbury
- Astor, Florida and Astor Park, Florida – William Backhouse Astor, Sr.
- Astoria, Oregon – John Jacob Astor
- Atchison, Kansas – David Rice Atchison (Missouri Senator)
- Aten, Nebraska – John Aten (state senator)
- Athol, Massachusetts – James Murray, 2nd Duke of Atholl
- Atkinson, Maine – Judge Atkinson (landholder)
- Atkinson, New Hampshire – Theodore Atkinson (landowner)
- Atwater, California – Marshall D. Atwater (farmer, landowner)
- Atwater, Minnesota – Isaac Atwater (settler of St. Paul)
- Atwater Township, Ohio – Amzi Atwater (surveyor)
- Atwood, Kansas – Attwood Matheny (founder's son)
- Auberry, California – Al Yarborough
- Audubon, Minnesota – John James Audubon
- Augusta, Georgia – Princess Augusta of Saxe-Gotha
- Augusta, Kansas – Augusta James (trader's wife)
- Augusta, Maine – Augusta Dearborn (daughter of Henry Dearborn)
- Ault, Colorado – Alexander Ault (flour mill owner)
- Aurelius, New York – Marcus Aurelius (Roman emperor)
- Austin, Minnesota – Austin Nichols (settler)
- Austin, Texas – Stephen F. Austin
- Ave Maria, Florida – Mary, mother of Jesus
- Averill, Vermont – Samuel Averill (landholder)
- Avery, California – George J. Avery (first postmaster)
- Averys Gore, Vermont – Samuel Avery (Westminster deputy sheriff and jailkeeper)
- Axtell, Kansas – Dr. Jesse Axtell (officer of the St. Joseph and Grand Island Railway)
- Ayer, Massachusetts – Dr. James Cook Ayer (patent-medicine manufacturer)

== B ==
- Bagby, California – Benjamin A. Bagby (merchant, hotelier, innkeeper)
- Bainbridge, New York – Commodore William Bainbridge
- Baird, Texas – Matthew Baird (president of Baldwin Locomotive Works)
- Baker, Montana – A.G. Baker (engineer with the Chicago, Milwaukee, St. Paul and Pacific Railroad)
- Baker City, Oregon – Senator Edward D. Baker (indirectly via Baker County, Oregon)
- Baker County, Florida – James McNair Baker, judge and Confederate Senator
- Bakersfield, California – Colonel Thomas Baker
- Bakersfield, Vermont – Joseph Baker (landowner)
- Baldwin, Georgia – Abraham Baldwin (U.S. Senator)
- Baldwin, Maine – Colonel Loammi Baldwin (namesake of the Baldwin apple)
- Baldwin, Michigan – Governor Henry P. Baldwin
- Baldwin, Chemung County, New York – Isaac, Thomas, and Walter Baldwin (settlers)
- Baldwin, Wisconsin – D.A. Baldwin (settler)
- Baldwin City, Kansas – John Baldwin
- Baldwinsville, New York – Dr. Jonas Baldwin (settler)
- Ballantine, Montana – E.P. Ballantine (homesteader)
- Ballston, New York and Ballston Spa, New York – Rev. Eliphalet Ball (settler)
- Baltimore, Maryland – Lord Baltimore
- Banning, California – Phineas Banning, stagecoach line owner and Father of the Port of Los Angeles.
- Bar Nunn, Wyoming - Romie Nunn (1903-1988)
- Baraboo, Wisconsin – Jean Baribault (settler)
- Baraga, Michigan – Bishop Friedrich Baraga
- Barber, California – O. C. Barber (president of the Diamond Match Company)
- Barberton, Ohio – O. C. Barber (president of the Diamond Match Company)
- Barboursville, West Virginia – Philip P. Barbour (governor of Virginia)
- Bard, California – Thomas R. Bard (irrigation district official)
- Bardstown, Kentucky – David Bard, who obtained the original town site from the governor of Virginia, and his brother William Bard, who surveyed the site
- Bargersville, Indiana – Jefferson Barger
- Baring Plantation, Maine – Alexander Baring, 1st Baron Ashburton
- Barker, Broome County, New York – John Barker (settler)
- Barlow, Oregon – John L. Barlow (settler)
- Barnard, Vermont – Sir Francis Bernard (landholder) (note spelling)
- Barnard, Missouri – railroad superintendent J. F. Barnard (or possibly B. F. Barnard)

- Barnes, Kansas – A.S. Barnes (publisher)
- Barnum, Denver, Colorado – P. T. Barnum (landowner)
- Barnwell, South Carolina – Barnwell family
- Barraque Township, Arkansas – Antoine Barraqué (landowner)
- Barre, Massachusetts, Barre, New York, Barre (city), Vermont and Barre (town), Vermont – Isaac Barré (Irish soldier and politician)
- Barrington, New Hampshire and Barrington, Rhode Island – John Shute Barrington, 1st Viscount Barrington (brother of Samuel Shute, governor of Massachusetts)
- Barron, Wisconsin – Henry D. Barron (judge)
- Barstow, California – William Barstow Strong (ATSF president)
- Bartlett, Illinois – Luther Bartlett
- Bartlett, New Hampshire – Dr. Josiah Bartlett
- Bartlett Springs, California – Green Bartlett (resort owner)
- Barton, Vermont – General William Barton
- Bartow, Florida and Bartow, Georgia – Francis S. Bartow (Confederate general)
- Bastrop, Louisiana and Bastrop, Texas – Felipe Enrique Neri, Baron de Bastrop (Dutch embezzler who falsely claimed to be a nobleman)
- Batesville, Arkansas – James Woodson Bates
- Batesville, Ohio – Rev. Timothy Bates
- Bath, New Hampshire – William Pulteney, 1st Earl of Bath
- Bath, New York – Henrietta Pulteney, Countess of Bath
- Battleboro, North Carolina – James S. and Joseph Battle (railroaders)
- Bayard, West Virginia – Thomas F. Bayard (U.S. Senator from Delaware)
- Bayfield, Wisconsin – Rear Admiral Henry Wolsey Bayfield
- Bay St. Louis, Mississippi – Louis IX of France
- Beacon, Iowa – Benjamin Disraeli, Earl of Beaconfield
- Beals, Maine – Manwaring Beal (settler)
- Bealville, California – Edward Fitzgerald Beale (landowner)
- Beardstown, Illinois – Thomas Beard (settler)
- Beatrice, Humboldt County, California – Beatrice White (first postmaster)
- Beattie, Kansas – A. Beattie (mayor of St. Joseph, Missouri)
- Beattyville, Kentucky – Samuel Beatty (settler)
- Beaufort, North Carolina and Beaufort, South Carolina – Henry Somerset, 2nd Duke of Beaufort
- Beauregard, Mississippi – P. G. T. Beauregard (Confederate general)
- Beaumont, Texas – Jefferson Beaumont (early settler and public official)
- Becker, Minnesota – George Loomis Becker (mayor of Saint Paul)
- Beckley, West Virginia – Gen. Alfred Beckley (settler)
- Beckwourth, California – James Beckwourth, adventurer and early settler
- Bedford, Massachusetts – Wriothesley Russell, 2nd Duke of Bedford
- Bedford, New Hampshire and Bedford, Virginia – John Russell, 4th Duke of Bedford
- Bedford, Tennessee – Thomas Bedford
- Beebe, Arkansas – Roswell Beebe (settler)
- Beecher City, Illinois – Charles A. Beecher (railroader)
- Beekman, New York – Henry Beekman (landowner)
- Beekmantown, New York – William Beekman (landowner)
- Beeville, Texas – Barnard E. Bee, Sr. (served as Secretary of State and Secretary of War for the Republic of Texas) (indirectly, via Bee County, Texas)
- Belchertown, Massachusetts – Jonathan Belcher (governor of Massachusetts and New Jersey)
- Belden, California – Robert Belden (first postmaster)
- Belleville, Kansas – Arabelle Tutton (landowner's wife)
- Bellingham, Massachusetts – Governor Richard Bellingham
- Bellingham, Washington – Sir William Bellingham, 1st Baronet
- Bellmont, New York – William Bell (landowner)
- Bellows Falls, Vermont – Colonel Benjamin Bellows (landowner)
- Bellwood, Nebraska – D.J. Bell (landowner)
- Belmont, Missouri and Belmont, New Hampshire – August Belmont (financier)
- Belton, Texas – Governor Peter Hansborough Bell
- Beltrami, Minnesota – Giacomo Beltrami
- Belva, West Virginia – Belva Ann Lockwood
- Belzoni, Mississippi – Giovanni Battista Belzoni
- Bemis Heights, New York – Jonathan Bemis (innkeeper)
- Benedicta, Maine – Bishop Benedict Fenwick (landowner)
- Benicia, California – Francisca Benicia Carillo de Vallejo (wife of Mariano Guadalupe Vallejo)
- Benner Township, Pennsylvania – General Phillip Benner (ironmaster)
- Bennett, Iowa – Chet Bennett (railroader)
- Bennettville, California – Thomas Bennett (mining company president)
- Bennington, New Hampshire – colonial governor Benning Wentworth (indirectly, via Bennington, Vermont)
- Bennington, Vermont – colonial governor Benning Wentworth
- Benton, 7 places in Arkansas, California, Kentucky, Louisiana, Maine, Minnesota, and New Hampshire – Senator Thomas Hart Benton
- Benton, New York – Levi Benton (settler)
- Benton Hot Springs, California – Senator Thomas Hart Benton
- Bentonia, Mississippi – Bentonia Green (resident)
- Bentonville, Arkansas – Senator Thomas Hart Benton
- Benwood, West Virginia – Benjamin Latrobe II
- Beresford, South Dakota – Lord Charles Beresford
- Berkeley, California – Bishop George Berkeley
- Berkeley Springs, West Virginia – colonial governor William Berkeley
- Berkley, Massachusetts – Bishop George Berkeley (The extra 'e' was apparently dropped by mistake when officially registered by the State House)
- Berkley, Virginia – Norborne Berkeley, 4th Baron Botetourt
- Bermuda, 5 places in Alabama, Georgia, Louisiana, South Carolina, and Tennessee – Juan de Bermúdez (indirectly, after Bermuda)
- Bernards Township, New Jersey – Sir Francis Bernard of Nether Winchendon House, England
- Bernardston, Massachusetts – Sir Francis Bernard, 1st Baronet
- Berrien Township, Michigan – John M. Berrien
- Berryville, Arkansas – Governor James H. Berry
- Berthoud, Colorado – Edward L. Berthoud (railroad surveyor and engineer)
- Bessemer, Alabama, Bessemer, Michigan, and Bessemer City, North Carolina – Henry Bessemer (English inventor of a steel making process)
- Beveridge, California – John Beveridge
- Beverly, West Virginia – William Beverly (landowner)
- Bevier, Kentucky and Bevier, Missouri – Col. Robert Bevier
- Bexar, 4 places in Alabama, Arkansas, Tennessee, and Texas (county) – Ferdinand VI of Spain (originally the Duke of Bexar)
- Bieber, California – Nathan Bieber (early settler and first postmaster)
- Bienville, Louisiana – Jean-Baptiste Le Moyne de Bienville
- Billings, Montana – Frederick H. Billings
- Billingsport, New Jersey – Edward Byllynge (merchant and colonial governor) (note the spelling)
- Biltmore Forest, North Carolina – George Washington Vanderbilt II
- Bingham, Maine – William Bingham (landowner)
- Binghamton, New York – William Bingham
- Birchville, California – L. Birch Adsit
- Birdsall, New York – John Birdsall (judge)
- Birdsboro, Pennsylvania – William Bird (landowner)
- Bishop, California – Samuel Addison Bishop (settler) (indirectly, via Bishop Creek)
- Bismarck, Missouri and Bismarck, North Dakota – Otto von Bismarck
- Blacksburg, Virginia – William Black (landowner)
- Blackstone, Massachusetts – Rev. William Blaxton (settler) (spelling variant)
- Blackwells Corner, California – George Blackwell (merchant)
- Bladenboro, North Carolina – Martin Bladen
- Blaine, Maine – James G. Blaine
- Blair, Nebraska – John Insley Blair (official of the Sioux City and Pacific Railroad)
- Blairsden, California – James A. Blair (financier of the Western Pacific Railroad)
- Blairstown, Iowa and Blairstown, New Jersey – John Insley Blair (railroad magnate and one of the 19th century's wealthiest men)
- Blairsville, Pennsylvania – John Blair (resident)
- Blakely, Georgia – Captain Johnston Blakeley, U.S. Navy
- Blanchard, California – Rosie M. Blanchard (first postmaster)
- Blanchard, Maine – Charles Blanchard (landowner)
- Blanco, Monterey County, California – Tom White (settler); "Blanco" is "White" in Spanish
- Blandford, Massachusetts – John Churchill, 1st Duke of Marlborough (also held the title Marquess of Blandford)
- Blandville, Kentucky – Capt. Bland Ballard
- Bleecker, New York – Rutger Jansen Bleecker (landowner)
- Blissfield, Michigan – Henry Bliss (landowner)
- Blocksburg, California – Benjamin Blockburger (merchant and founder)
- Bloomfield, New Jersey – Governor Joseph Bloomfield
- Blossburg, Pennsylvania – Aaron Bloss (settler)
- Blountsville, Indiana – Andrew Blount (founder)
- Blythe, California – Thomas Henry Blythe; San Francisco capitalist
- Boardman, Ohio – Frederick Boardman (landowner)
- Bodfish, California – George H. Bodfish (early settler)
- Bodie, California – W.S. Bodey (prospector)
- Boerne, Texas – Louis Boerne (German writer)
- Bolivar, five places in Missouri, Mississippi, New York, West Virginia, and Tennessee – Simón Bolivar
- Bolton, Massachusetts – Charles Powlett, 3rd Duke of Bolton
- Bonaparte, Iowa – Napoleon Bonaparte
- Bonds Corner, California – Dr. J.L. Bond (homesteader)
- Bondurant, Iowa – A.C. Bondurant
- Bonham, Texas – Col. J.B. Bonham
- Bonner Springs, Kansas – Robert E. Bonner (editor of the New York Ledger)
- Bonneville, Oregon – Benjamin Bonneville (explorer)
- Booge, South Dakota – C.A. Booge
- Boone, North Carolina, Boone Station, Kentucky, and Boonville, North Carolina – Daniel Boone
- Boonville, California – W.W. Boone (merchant)
- Boonton, New Jersey – Thomas Boone (colonial governor)
- Boonville, New York – Gerrit Boon (land agent)
- Borden, California – Dr. James Borden (civic leader)
- Borden, Texas – Gail Borden (customs official)
- Bordentown, New Jersey – Joseph Borden (founder)
- Boscawen, New Hampshire – Lord Edward Boscawen
- Bossier City, Louisiana – Pierre Bossier (general)
- Bostic, North Carolina – George T. Bostic
- Bottineau, North Dakota – Pierre Bottineau (settler)
- Bouckville, New York – Governor William C. Bouck
- Bourbon, Indiana – House of Bourbon
- Bourne, Massachusetts – Jonathan Bourne Sr. (son of Richard Bourne, who served in the Massachusetts General Court)
- Bowdoin, Maine – James Bowdoin (governor of Massachusetts)
- Bowdoinham, Maine – William Bowdoin (landowner)
- Bowerstown, New Jersey – Michael B. Bowers (iron foundry owner)
- Bowie, Maryland – Colonel William D. Bowie
- Bowie, Texas – James Bowie
- Bowman, California – Harry Bowman (fruit grower)
- Boyd, Kentucky – Lt. Governor Linn Boyd
- Boykin, Alabama - Frank W. Boykin
- Boylston, New York – Thomas Boylston (doctor)
- Bozeman, Montana – John Bozeman
- Braddock, Pennsylvania – Gen. Edward Braddock
- Bradford County, Florida – Capt. Richard Bradford, first Confederate officer from Florida to die in the Civil War
- Bradford, Pennsylvania – Attorney General William Bradford
- Bradfordsville, Kentucky – Peter Bradford (settler)
- Bradley, California – Bradley V. Sargent (landowner)
- Bradley, Maine – Bradley Blackman (settler)
- Bradley Beach, New Jersey – James A. Bradley (landowner)
- Bradshaw City, Arizona – William D. Bradshaw
- Bradys Bend, Pennsylvania – Capt. Samuel Brady
- Bradtmoore, California – Bradley T. Moore (founder)
- Brainerd, Kansas – E.B. Brainerd (landowner)
- Brainerd, Minnesota – David Brainerd (missionary)
- Brandon, Mississippi – Governor Gerard Brandon
- Brant, New York – Joseph Brant
- Brandt, South Dakota – Rev. P.O. Brandt
- Branscomb, California – Benjamin Franklin Branscomb (early settler)
- Brasher, New York – Philip Brasher (landowner)
- Brattleboro, Vermont – Colonel William Brattle, Jr. (proprietor)
- Breckenridge - John C. Breckinridge, 4 places in

- Colorado - Minnesota - Missouri - Texas (all spelling variants)

- Breedsville, Michigan – Silas Breed (settler)
- Breese, Illinois – Lt. Governor Sidney Breese
- Brevard County, Florida and Brevard, North Carolina – Ephraim J. Brevard (possible author of the Mecklenburg Declaration of Independence)
- Brewer, Maine – Colonel John Brewer (settler)
- Brewster, Massachusetts – Elder William Brewster
- Brewster, Minnesota – Elder William Brewster (indirectly, via Brewster, Massachusetts)
- Brewster, New York – Walter and James Brewster (two early farmer landowners)
- Briceburg, California – William M. Brice (merchant)
- Briceland, California – John C. Briceland (landowner)
- Bricelyn, Minnesota – John Brice (landowner)
- Bridger, Montana – Jim Bridger (frontiersman)
- Bridgton, Maine – Moody Bridges (settler)
- Briensburg, Kentucky – James Brien (state legislator)
- Brigham City, Utah – Brigham Young
- Briscoe, Texas – Andrew Briscoe (Texian patriot)
- Bristol (village), Wisconsin – Rev. Ira Bristol (settler)
- Broadus, Montana – Broaddus family (early settlers) (note spelling)
- Brockport, New York – Hiel Brockway (settler)
- Brockton, Massachusetts – Isaac Brock (British Army officer and administrator) (indirectly, after a local merchant heard of Brockville, Ontario, on a trip to Niagara Falls)
- Brockway, California – Nathaniel Brockway (uncle of postmaster)
- Broderick, California – U.S. Senator David C. Broderick
- Bronson, Kansas – Ira D. Bronson (prominent resident of Fort Scott)
- the Bronx, New York City – Jonas Bronck (settler)
- Brooks, Maine – John Brooks (Federalist candidate for Governor of Massachusetts)
- Brooks County, Georgia – Congressman Preston Brooks
- Brooksville, Florida – Congressman Preston Brooks
- Brookville, Indiana – Jesse Brook Thomas (proprietor)
- Brown, California – George Brown (hotelier)
- Brownfield, Maine – Captain Henry Young Brown (served in the French and Indian War)
- Brownington, Vermont – Daniel and Timothy Brown (landholders)
- Brownstown, Indiana, Brownsville, Kentucky, and Brownsville, Tennessee – Jacob Jennings Brown (American army officer)
- Browns Valley, Minnesota – Joseph Brown (founder)
- Brownsville, Maryland – Tobias Brown (early settler)
- Brownsville, Pennsylvania – Thomas and Basil Brown (landowners)
- Brownsville, Texas – Major Jacob Brown
- Browntown, Wisconsin – William G. Brown (settler)
- Brownville, Maine – Francis Brown (mill owner and trader)
- Brownville, Nebraska – Richard Brown (settler)
- Brownville, New York – John Brown (settler and father of General Jacob Jennings Brown)
- Brownwood, Texas – Henry S. Brown (settler)
- Bruceville, Indiana – William Bruce (landowner)
- Brunswick, Maine – House of Brunswick
- Brunswick, Vermont – from one of the titles for Prince Karl Wilhelm Ferdinand of Brunswick-Lunenburg
- Brushton, New York – Henry N. Brush (landowner)
- Brutus, 4 places in Kentucky, Michigan, New York, and Virginia – Marcus Junius Brutus
- Bryan, Ohio – John A. Bryan (state auditor)
- Bryan, Texas – William Joel Bryan
- Bryson City, North Carolina – T.D. Bryson (state legislator and landowner)
- Bryte, California – Mike Bryte (local farmer and landowner)
- Buchanan, Michigan – James Buchanan
- Buchanan, Virginia – John Buchanan (settler)
- Buckfield, Maine – Abijah Buck (settler)
- Buckner, Missouri – Senator Alexander Buckner or Real Estate operator Simon Buckner or namesake is Thomas W. Buckner, an original owner of the site.
- Bucks Bridge, New York – Isaac Buck (settler)
- Buckskin Joe, Park County, Colorado – Joseph Higginbotham (frontiersman nicknamed "Buckskin Joe")
- Bucksport, California – David A. Buck (founder)
- Bucksport, Maine – Colonel Jonathan Buck (grantee)
- Bucoda, Washington – J.M. Buckley, Samuel Coulter, and John B. David (businessmen)
- Buels Gore, Vermont – Major Elias Buel (landholder)
- Bullittsville, Kentucky – Alexander Scott Bullitt
- Bullochville, Georgia – Archibald Bulloch
- Buna, Texas – Buna Corley (cousin of the Carroll family, prominent Beaumont lumbermen and industrialists)
- Bunceton, Missouri – Harvey Bunce (resident)
- Buntingville, California – A.J. Bunting (merchant)
- Burbank, California – David Burbank (dentist)
- Burden, Kansas – Robert F. Burden (landowner)
- Burdell, California – Dr. Galen Burdell (dentist, landowner)
- Bureau County, Illinois and Bureau Junction, Illinois – Pierre de Buero (trader) (note the spelling)
- Burgaw, North Carolina – Burgaw family (residents)
- Burke (town), New York and Burke, Vermont – Edmund Burke
- Burleson, Texas – Edward Burleson (Texian patriot)
- Burlingame, California - Anson Burlingame (abolitionist, legislator, diplomat)
- Burlingame, Kansas – Anson Burlingame (abolitionist, legislator, diplomat)
- Burlington, 5 places in Kansas, Iowa, Michigan, Vermont, and Wisconsin – Burling family (This family owned the land upon which the city in Vermont was built. The other cities derive their name from the Vermont one).
- Burnet, Texas – Governor David G. Burnet
- Burnsville, Indiana – Brice Bruns (founder)
- Burnsville, North Carolina – Otway Burns (boat captain)
- Burrel, California – Cuthbert Burrel (local rancher)
- Burrillville, Rhode Island – James Burrill, Jr. (state attorney general and U.S. senator)
- Burrton, Kansas – I.T. Burr (Vice President of the Atchison, Topeka and Santa Fe Railway)
- Burson, California – David S. Burson (railroad man)
- Bushnell, South Dakota – Frank E. Bushnell (landowner)
- Busti, New York – Paolo Busti (landowner)
- Butler, Missouri – General William O. Butler
- Buxton, Oregon – Henry Buxton (settler)
- Byers, Colorado – W.N. Byers (Denver resident)
- Bynumville, Missouri – Dr. Joseph Bynum (settler)
- Byron, 3 places in Georgia, Maine, and New York – Lord Byron (English poet)

== C ==
- Cable, Illinois – Ransom R. Cable (railroader)
- Cabot, Vermont – named by settler Lyman Hitchcock for his intended bride
- Cadillac, Michigan – Antoine de la Mothe Cadillac
- Cadott, Wisconsin – Baptiste Cadotte (resident) (note the spelling)
- Caldwell, Kansas – Alexander Caldwell (U.S. Senator)
- Caldwell, New Jersey – Rev. James Caldwell
- Caldwell, Ohio – Joseph and Samuel Caldwell (landowners)
- Caldwell, Texas – Mathew Caldwell (Texian patriot)
- Calhoun, Kentucky – John Calhoun (judge)
- Callaway, Missouri – Capt. James Callaway
- Callensburg, Pennsylvania – Hugh Callen (founder)
- Calvert, Maryland – Cecil Calvert, 2nd Baron Baltimore
- Camano Island, Washington – Jacinto Caamaño (explorer) (note the spelling)
- Camden, 4 places in Maine, New Jersey, New York, and North Carolina – Charles Pratt, 1st Earl Camden
- Cameron, 3 places in Louisiana, Pennsylvania, and West Virginia – Simon Cameron
- Cameron, Missouri – Malinda Cameron (maiden name of wife of Samuel McCorkle, who platted the town of Somerville, Missouri)
- Cameron, New York – Dugald Cameron (land agent)
- Cameron, South Carolina – J. Donald Cameron (U.S. Senator from Pennsylvania)
- Cameron, Texas – Ewen Cameron (Texian patriot)
- Camillus, New York – Marcus Furius Camillus (Roman military leader)
- Cammack Village, Arkansas - Wiley Dan Cammack (1880-1948)
- Camp Connell, California – John F. Connell (landowner and first postmaster)
- Camp Douglas, Wisconsin – James Douglas (established a camp along the Milwaukee Road to provide wood for the locomotives)
- Camp Pardee, California – George Pardee (governor of California)
- Camp Richardson, California – Alonzo L. Richardson (first postmaster)
- Campbell, California – Benjamin Campbell (founder)
- Campbell, New York – Campbell family (settlers)
- Campbellsville, Kentucky – Andrew Campbell (founder)
- Campion, Colorado – John F. Campion (hard rock mine owner and established the sugar beet industry)
- Camptonville, California – Robert Campton (town blacksmith)
- Canal Lewisville, Ohio – T.B. Lewis (founder)
- Canby, California and Canby, Oregon – General Edward Canby
- Canfield, Ohio – Jonathan Canfield (proprietor)
- Cannonsburg, Michigan – Le Grand Cannon (resident of Troy, New York)
- Cannonsville, New York – Benjamin Cannon (landowner)
- Canonsburg, Pennsylvania – John Cannon (founder) (note the spelling)
- Canova, South Dakota – Antonio Canova (Italian sculptor)
- Canterbury, New Hampshire – William Wake, Archbishop of Canterbury
- Capac, Michigan – Manco Cápac (Incan emperor)
- Cape Elizabeth, Maine – Elizabeth of Bohemia (sister of King Charles I of England)
- Cape Girardeau, Missouri – Jean Baptiste de Girardot (French soldier)
- Cape May, New Jersey – Cornelius Jacobsen May (explorer)
- Cape Vincent, New York – Vincent, son of Jacques-Donatien Le Ray de Chaumont
- Captain Cook, Hawaii – Captain James Cook (English explorer)
- Cardwell, Missouri – Frank Cardwell (resident of Paragould, Arkansas)
- Caribou, California – Johnny Caribou (early miner)
- Carlinville, Illinois – Governor Thomas Carlin
- Carlisle, Massachusetts – Charles Howard, 1st Earl of Carlisle
- Carlotta, California – Carlotta Vance (founder's daughter)
- Carnegie, Pennsylvania – Andrew Carnegie
- Carnesville, Georgia – Col. T.P. Carnes
- Carolina, Rhode Island – Caroline Hazard (wife of Rowland G. Hazard, mill owner)
- Carondelet, St. Louis, Missouri – Francisco Luis Héctor de Carondelet
- Carol Stream, Illinois – Carol Stream (1943-2020), founder's daughter
- Carr, Colorado – Robert E. Carr (managed the construction of the Union Pacific Railroad rail line through the town)
- Carroll, New Hampshire – Charles Carroll (a signer of the Declaration of Independence)
- Carroll Plantation, Maine – Daniel Carroll (a signer of the U.S. Constitution)
- Carrollton, New York – G. Carroll (landowner)
- Carson City, Nevada – Kit Carson
- Carson Hill, California – Sergeant James H. Carson
- Carter, Kentucky – William G. Carter (state senator)
- Carter, Tennessee – Gen. Landon Carter
- Carteret, New Jersey – George Carteret (proprietor of New Jersey) and Philip Carteret (first royal governor of New Jersey)
- Cartersville, Georgia – Col. F. Carter
- Caruthers, California – W.A. Caruthers (local farmer)
- Caruthersville, Missouri – Samuel Caruthers
- Carver, Massachusetts – John Carver (first Governor of Plymouth Colony)
- Carver, Minnesota – Capt. Jonathan Carver (explorer)
- Cary, North Carolina – Samuel Fenton Cary (Prohibition advocate)
- Caseyville, Kentucky – Col. William Casey
- Cashion, Oklahoma – Roy Cashion (member of the Rough Riders)
- Caspar, California – Siegfried Caspar (founder)
- Casper, Wyoming – Lieutenant Caspar Collins (killed by a group of Indian warriors) (note spelling)
- Casselton, North Dakota – Gen. George W. Cass (director of the Union Pacific Railroad)
- Cassville, Wisconsin – Lewis Cass
- Castine, Maine – Baron Jean-Vincent de St. Castin
- Castroville, California – Simeon Nepomuceno Castro (landowner)
- Castroville, Texas – Henri Castro (settler)
- Catharine, New York – Catherine Montour (note the spelling)
- Catheys Valley, California – Andrew Cathey (early settler)
- Cato (town), New York – either Cato the Elder or Cato the Younger
- Cavalier, North Dakota – Charles Cavalier (settler)
- Cavendish, Vermont – William Cavendish, 4th Duke of Devonshire
- Cawker City, Kansas – E.H. Cawker
- Cazenovia, 4 places in Illinois, Minnesota, New York, and Wisconsin – Theophilus Cazenove (land agent) (The New York town is the original, and the others were named for it).
- Cecilton, Maryland - Cecil Calvert, 2nd Baron Baltimore
- Center Harbor, New Hampshire – Col. Joseph Senter (settler) (note the spelling)
- Chadds Ford Township, Pennsylvania – Francis Chadsey (proprietor)
- Chalfant Valley, California – Arthur Chalfant (newspaper publisher)
- Chamberlain, South Dakota – Selah Chamberlain (railroad director)
- Chambersburg, Pennsylvania – Benjamin Chambers (founder)
- Chambers Lodge, California – David H. Chambers (lodge builder)
- Champion, New York – Gen. Henry Champion (settler)
- Champlain, New York – Samuel de Champlain
- Chandler, Arizona – Dr. Alexander John Chandler
- Chandlerville, Illinois – Dr. Charles Chandler (founder)
- Chandler's Purchase, New Hampshire – Jeremiah Chanler (landowner) (note the spelling)
- Chanute, Kansas – Octave Chanute (engineer with the Leavenworth, Lawrence and Galveston Railroad)
- Chaplin, Connecticut – Deacon Benjamin Chaplin (early settler)
- Chapman, Pennsylvania – William Chapman (slate mine owner)
- Chardon, Ohio – Peter Chardon Brooks (proprietor)
- Charles Town, West Virginia – Charles Washington (founder; younger brother of George Washington)
- Charleston, Maine – Charles Vaughan (settler)
- Charleston, Mississippi – King Charles II of England (indirectly, via Charleston, South Carolina)
- Charleston, South Carolina – King Charles II of England
- Charleston, West Virginia – Charles Clendenin (father of Colonel George Clendenin, a landholder who built Fort Lee here)
- Charlestown, New Hampshire – Admiral Sir Charles Knowles, 1st Baronet of the British Royal Navy
- Charlestown, Rhode Island – King Charles II of England
- Charlevoix, Michigan – Francis X. Charlevoix (missionary)
- Charlotte, Maine – Charlotte Vance (wife of legislator William Vance)
- Charlotte, New York and Charlottesville, Virginia – Princess Charlotte of Wales
- Charlotte, North Carolina and Charlotte, Vermont – Charlotte of Mecklenburg-Strelitz (wife of King George III)
- Charlotte Amalie – Charlotte Amalie of Hesse-Kassel (or Hesse-Cassel)
- Charlton, Massachusetts – Sir Francis Charlton, 2nd Baronet
- Chartiers Township, Pennsylvania – Peter Chartier (trader)
- Chatfield, Minnesota – Judge Andrew Chatfield
- Chatham, 4 places in Massachusetts, New Hampshire, New Jersey, and New York – William Pitt, 1st Earl of Chatham (Prime Minister of Great Britain)
- Chaumont, New York – Jacques-Donatien Le Ray de Chaumont (proprietor)
- Cheney, Kansas – P.B. Cheney (stockholder of the Atchison, Topeka and Santa Fe Railway)
- Cheney, Washington – Benjamin P. Cheney (founder of the Northern Pacific Railway)
- Cheneyville, Louisiana – William Cheney (settler)
- Chester, Vermont – George IV of the United Kingdom, the Earl of Chester (eldest son of George III of the United Kingdom)
- Chesterfield, Massachusetts and Chesterfield, New Hampshire – Philip Stanhope, 4th Earl of Chesterfield
- Chichester, New Hampshire – Thomas Pelham-Holles, 1st Duke of Newcastle-upon-Tyne, Earl of Chichester
- Childress, Texas – George Childress (Texian patriot)
- Chittenden, Vermont – Thomas Chittenden (one of the Green Mountain Boys and later governor)
- Chivington, Colorado – John Chivington (soldier and perpetrator of the Sand Creek massacre)
- Chockie, Oklahoma - Laurina "Chockie" LeFlore Maupin (1871-1962)
- Choteau, Montana – Auguste and Pierre Chouteau (founders of St. Louis, Missouri) (note the spelling)
- Christiana, Delaware and Christiana, Pennsylvania – Queen Christina of Sweden
- Christiansted – Christian VI of Denmark
- Chubbuck, Idaho - Earl Chubbuck (1916–1984), railroad conductor
- Churchville, New York – Samuel Church (settler)
- Cicero, Illinois – Cicero (indirectly, via Cicero, New York)
- Cicero, New York – Cicero
- Cincinnati, Ohio – Lucius Quinctius Cincinnatus (indirectly, via the Society of the Cincinnati)
- Cincinnatus, New York – Lucius Quinctius Cincinnatus
- Cisco, California – John J. Cisco (treasurer of the railroad)
- Cisco Grove, California – John J. Cisco (treasurer of the railroad)
- Clanton, Alabama – James Holt Clanton (Confederate general)
- Clapper, Missouri – Henry Clapper (railroader)
- Claraville, California – Clara Munckton (first white woman there)
- Clarence, Missouri – Clarence Duff (son of John Duff, settler)
- Clark Fork, Idaho – Governor William Clark
- Clarkia, Idaho – Governor William Clark
- Clarks, Nebraska – S.H.H. Clark (superintendent of the Union Pacific Railroad)
- Clarksburg, California – Robert C. Clark (early settler)
- Clarksburg, Massachusetts – Nicholas Clark (early settler)
- Clarksburg, West Virginia – Gen. George Rogers Clark
- Clarkston, Washington – Governor William Clark
- Clarkesville, Georgia – Governor John Clarke
- Clarksville, Indiana – Gen. George Rogers Clark
- Clarksville, Missouri – Governor William Clark
- Clarksville, New Hampshire – Benjamin Clark
- Clarkton, Missouri – Henry E. Clark (contractor)
- Clay, 4 places in Florida (county), Illinois, Indiana, and Kentucky – Henry Clay (United States Secretary of State in the 19th century)
- Clayton, California – Joel Henry Clayton (founder)
- Clayton, Delaware – Thomas Clayton (U.S. senator)
- Clayton, Georgia – Augustin Smith Clayton (U.S. congressman)
- Clayton, Missouri – Ralph Clayton
- Clayton, New York and Clayton, North Carolina – John M. Clayton (U.S. Senator from Delaware)
- Cleburne, Texas – Patrick Cleburne (Confederate general)
- Clendenin, West Virginia – Charles Clendenin (father of Colonel George Clendenin)
- Cleveland, North Carolina and Cleveland, Tennessee – Colonel Benjamin Cleveland
- Cleveland, Ohio – Moses Cleaveland (note spelling)
- Cleveland, Texas – Charles Lander Cleveland (local judge)
- Cleveland, Manitowoc County, Wisconsin – Grover Cleveland
- Clifford, Michigan – Clifford Lyman (first child born there)
- Clinton – DeWitt Clinton, 16 places in
  - Arkansas – Connecticut – Illinois – Indiana – Iowa – Louisiana – Maine – Massachusetts – Michigan – Minnesota – Mississippi – Missouri – New Jersey – New York (city and county) – Ohio – Wisconsin
- Clinton, Kansas – DeWitt Clinton (indirectly, via Clinton, Illinois)
- Clinton, Montana – General Sir Henry Clinton
- Clinton, Nebraska – DeWitt Clinton (indirectly, via Clinton, Iowa)
- Clinton, Dutchess County, New York – George Clinton (early governor of New York)
- Clinton, Oneida County, New York – George Clinton (early governor of New York)
- Clinton, North Carolina – American Revolution General Richard Clinton
- Clinton, Oklahoma – Clinton Irwin (territorial judge)
- Clinton, South Carolina – Henry Clinton Young (Laurens lawyer who helped lay out the first streets)
- Clinton, Tennessee - George Clinton (vice president)
- Clinton, Washington – DeWitt Clinton (indirectly, via Clinton, Lenawee County, Michigan)
- Clockville, New York – John Klock (landowner) (note the spelling)
- Clovis, California – Clovis Cole (local farmer)
- Clymers, Indiana – George Clymer (founder)
- Clymer, New York – George Clymer (signer of the Declaration of Independence)
- Coatesville, Pennsylvania – Moses Coates (settler)
- Cochran, Georgia – Arthur E. Cochran (judge)
- Cockeysville, Maryland – Thomas Cockey (settler)
- Coeymans, New York – Barent Peterse Coeymans (landowner)
- Coffeeville, Mississippi – Gen. John Coffee
- Coffeyville, Kansas – A.M. Coffey (state legislator)
- Cokesbury, South Carolina – Bishops Thomas Coke and Francis Asbury
- Colby, Kansas – J.R. Colby (settler)
- Colby, Wisconsin – Charles Colby (president of the Wisconsin Central Railroad)
- Colchester, Vermont – Earl of Colchester
- Colden, New York – Cadwallader D. Colden (state legislator)
- Colebrook, New Hampshire – Sir George Colebrooke (landowner) (note the spelling)
- Coleman, Texas – R.M. Coleman (Texas Ranger)
- Coleville, California – Cornelius Cole (US Senator)
- Colesville, New York – Nathaniel Cole (settler)
- Colfax, 5 places in California, Indiana, Louisiana, Michigan, and Washington – Schuyler Colfax (US Vice President)
- Collettsville, North Carolina – Colletts family (residents)
- Collier County, Florida – Barron Collier
- Collinsville, Illinois – Collins brothers (founders)
- Colrain, Massachusetts – Lord Coleraine (note spelling)
- Colquitt, Georgia and Colquitt County, Georgia – U.S. Senator Walter T. Colquitt
- Colton, New York – Jesse Colton Higley (settler)
- Columbia, South Carolina – Christopher Columbus
- Columbus, Georgia and Columbus, Ohio – Christopher Columbus (Italian explorer)
- Communipaw, New Jersey – Michael Reyniersz Pauw (director of the Dutch West India Company) (note the spelling)
- Compton, California – Griffith D. Compton (settler)
- Conklin, New York – Judge John Conklin
- Connellsville, Pennsylvania – Zachariah Connell (founder)
- Connersville, Indiana – John Conner (founder)
- Connersville, Kentucky – Lewis Conner
- Conroe, Texas – Isaac Conroe (Union Cavalry officer)
- Constable, New York and Constableville, New York – William Constable (proprietor)
- Conway, Arkansas – Henry Wharton Conway (territorial delegate to Congress)
- Conway, Massachusetts and Conway, New Hampshire – General Henry Seymour Conway (Commander in Chief of the British Army)
- Conway, South Carolina – Gen. Robert Conway (resident)
- Cooksburg, New York – Thomas B. Cook (landowner)
- Coolidge, Kansas – Thomas Jefferson Coolidge (president of the Atchison, Topeka and Santa Fe Railway)
- Coolidge, Arizona – named for 30th President of the United States Calvin Coolidge and the most recent city to be named after a U.S. President
- Cooper, Maine – General John Cooper (landowner)
- Cooper City, Florida - Morris Cooper (1892-1975)
- Cooper River (South Carolina) – Anthony Ashley Cooper, 1st Earl of Shaftesbury
- Cooperstown, New York – William Cooper
- Cooperstown, Pennsylvania – William Cooper (founder)
- Coopersville, Clinton County, New York – Ebenezer Cooper (mill owner)
- Cope, Colorado – Jonathan Cope (founder)
- Cope, South Carolina – J. Martin Cope (founder)
- Coraopolis, Pennsylvania – Cora Watson (wife of landowner)
- Corbett, Oregon – U.S. Senator Henry W. Corbett
- Corinna, Maine – Corinna Warren (daughter of Dr. John Warren, landowner)
- Corinne, Utah – Corinne Williamson (daughter of General J.A. Williamson)
- Cornelius, Oregon – Col. Thomas R. Cornelius
- Cornettsville, Indiana – Myer and Samuel Cornett (founders)
- Corning (city), New York and Corning, Kansas – Erastus Corning (politician)
- Cornish, New Hampshire – Vice-Admiral Samuel Cornish of the British Royal Navy
- Cornplanter Township, Venango County, Pennsylvania – Cornplanter (Native American chief)
- Coronado, California and Coronado, Kansas – Francisco Vázquez de Coronado (explorer)
- Corpus Christi, Texas – Jesus Christ (Body of Christ)
- Corrigan, Texas – Pat Corrigan (train conductor)
- Corry, Pennsylvania – Hiram Corry (landowner)
- Corsicana, Texas – Corcisana Navarro (wife of landowner)
- Cortland, New York, Cortlandt, New York, and Cortlandville, New York – Pierre Van Cortlandt (first Lieutenant Governor of New York)
- Corwin, Ohio – Thomas Corwin (Governor and U.S. Senator)
- Cottleville, Missouri – Lorenzo Cottle (settler)
- Cottrell Key, Florida – Jeremiah Cottrell (lighthouse keeper)
- Coulter, Pennsylvania – Eli Coulter (settler)
- Coulterville, California – George W. Coulter (early settler)
- Coupeville, Washington – Captain Thomas Coupe (founder)
- Courtland, Kansas – Pierre Van Cortlandt (indirectly, via Cortland, New York) (note the spelling)
- Coutolenc, California – Eugene Coutolenc (early merchant)
- Covington, 3 places in Georgia, Kentucky, and New York – Gen. Leonard Covington
- Cowell, California – Joshua Cowell (landowner)
- Cowles, Nebraska – W.D. Cowles (railroader)
- Cozad, Nebraska – John J. Cozad (landowner)
- Crabtree, California – John F. Crabtree (homesteader)
- Crabtree, Oregon – John J. Crabtree (settler)
- Craftsbury, Vermont – Ebenezer Crafts (landholder)
- Craig, Colorado – Rev. Bayard Craig
- Cranesville, Pennsylvania – Fowler Crane (founder)
- Crannell, California – Levi Crannell (lumber company president)
- Cranston, Rhode Island – Gov. Samuel Cranston
- Crawford, Georgia and Crawford, Maine – William H. Crawford (U.S. Senator, Secretary of War, and Secretary of the Treasury)
- Crawford's Purchase, New Hampshire – Ethan A. Crawford (landowner)
- Crawfordsville, Indiana – William H. Crawford (U.S. Senator, Secretary of War, and Secretary of the Treasury)
- Crawfordsville, Oregon – George F. Crawford (settler)
- Crawfordville, Georgia – William H. Crawford (U.S. Senator, Secretary of War, and Secretary of the Treasury)
- Cresson, Pennsylvania and Cressona, Pennsylvania – Elliott Cresson (Philadelphia merchant)
- Cressey, California – Calvin J. Cressey (landowner)
- Creswell, North Carolina – Postmaster General John Creswell
- Crittenden, Kentucky – U.S. Senator John J. Crittenden
- Crockett, California – Joseph B. Crockett (California Supreme Court judge)
- Crockett, Texas – Davy Crockett
- Croghan (town), New York – Col. George Croghan
- Crook, Colorado – General George Crook (officer during the Civil War and the Indian Wars)
- Crosbyton, Texas – Stephen Crosby (land office commissioner)
- Croswell, Michigan – Gov. Charles Croswell
- Crowley, Polk County, Oregon – Solomon K. Crowley (settler)
- Crugers, New York – Col. John P. Cruger
- Cudahy, California – Michael Cudahy
- Cudahy, Wisconsin – Patrick Cudahy (meatpacker)
- Cullen, Louisiana - Hugh Roy Cullen
- Cullman, Alabama – Gen. John G. Cullmann (note the spelling)
- Culloden, Georgia – William Culloden (settler)
- Cullom, Illinois – Shelby Moore Cullom (U.S. Senator)
- Culpeper, Virginia – Thomas Colepeper, 2nd Baron Colepeper (note the spelling)
- Cumberland, Maryland and Cumberland, Rhode Island – Prince William, Duke of Cumberland
- Cumming, Georgia – Col. William Cumming
- Cummings, Mendocino County, California – Jonathan Cummings (early settler)
- Cummington, Massachusetts – Colonel John Cummings (landholder)
- Cumminsville, Nebraska – J.F. Cummings (county clerk) (note the spelling)
- Cumminsville, Ohio – David Cummins (settler)
- Cupertino, California – Joseph of Cupertino
- Curry Village, California – David A. Curry (founder)
- Curryville, Missouri – Perry Curry (founder)
- Curwensville, Pennsylvania – John Curwen
- Cushing, Maine – Thomas Cushing (statesman and lieutenant governor of Massachusetts)
- Custer, 5 places in Colorado, Idaho, Montana, Nebraska, and South Dakota – Gen. George Armstrong Custer
- Cuthbert, Georgia – Col. John Alfred Cuthbert (congressman)
- Cutler, Maine – Joseph Cutler (settler)
- Cynthiana, Kentucky – Cynthia and Anna Harris (daughters of landowner)

== D ==
- Dacono, Colorado – Daisy Baum, Cora Van Vorhies and Nona (or Nora) Brooks (local residents)
- Dade City, Florida – Major Francis L. Dade
- Dadeville, Alabama – Major Francis L. Dade
- Daggett, Indiana – Charles Daggett (resident)
- Dagsboro, Delaware – Sir John Dagworthy
- Daisetta, Texas – Daisy Barrett and Etta White (early residents)
- Dallas, North Carolina and Dallas, Texas – George M. Dallas
- Dallas Center, Iowa – George M. Dallas
- Dalton, Massachusetts and Dalton, New Hampshire – Tristram Dalton (Speaker of the Massachusetts House of Representatives)
- Dalton, Missouri – William Dalton
- Dandridge, Tennessee – Martha Washington (née Dandridge)
- Danforth, Maine – Thomas Danforth (proprietor)
- Danielsville, Georgia – Gen. Allen Daniel Jr.
- Dansville, Michigan – Daniel L. Crossman (resident)
- Dansville, Livingston County, New York and Dansville, Steuben County, New York – Daniel P. Faulkner (founder)
- Danvers, Massachusetts – Danvers Osborn family
- Danville, California – Daniel Inman (local landowner)
- Danville, Georgia – Daniel G. Hughes (father of U.S. Representative Dudley Mays Hughes)
- Danville, Indiana – Daniel Bales (proprietor)
- Danville, Kentucky – Walker Daniel (founder)
- Danville, Missouri – Daniel M. Boone (landowner and son of Daniel Boone)
- Danville, Pennsylvania – Gen. Daniel Montgomery Jr.
- Danville, Vermont – Jean-Baptiste Bourguignon d'Anville
- Darkesville, West Virginia – Gen. William Darke
- Darlington, Pennsylvania – S.P. Darlington (Pittsburgh merchant)
- Darwin, California – Dr. Darwin French
- Darwin, Illinois – Charles Darwin
- Daulton, California – Henry Clay Daulton (landowner and politician)
- Davenport, Iowa – Colonel George Davenport
- Davenport, Nebraska – Colonel George Davenport (indirectly, via Davenport, Iowa)
- Davenport, New York – John Davenport (settler)
- Davidson, North Carolina – Gen. William Lee Davidson
- David, Kentucky - David L. Francis (1914-1985), president of Princess Elkhorn Coal Company
- Davie, Florida – Randolph P. Davie (developer)
- Davis, California – Jerome C. Davis (local farmer)
- Davis, West Virginia – Henry Gassaway Davis (U.S. Senator)
- Dawson, Illinois – John Dawson (member of "The Long Nine", a group of legislators from Sangamon County)
- Dawson, Nebraska – Joshua Dawson (settler)
- Dawsonville, Georgia – William Crosby Dawson (U.S. Senator)
- Dayton, Maine and Dayton, Ohio – Jonathan Dayton
- Dayton, Texas – I. C. Day (landowner) (combination of Day's Town)
- Daytona Beach, Florida – Matthias Day
- Dearborn, Michigan and Dearborn, Missouri – Henry Dearborn (Revolutionary War general and Secretary of War)
- Deblois, Maine – T.A. Deblois (president of the Bank of Portland)
- Decatur, 4 places in Georgia, Illinois, Mississippi, and New York – Stephen Decatur (War of 1812 naval hero)
- Decatur, Nebraska – Stephen Decatur (one of the village's incorporators)
- Decorah, Iowa – Decorie (Native American chief)
- Decoto, California – Ezra Decoto (landowner)
- Deering, New Hampshire – Frances Deering Wentworth (the maiden name of Governor John Wentworth's wife)
- Delancey, New York – James De Lancey (landowner)
- DeLand, Florida – Henry Addison DeLand (founder, also founded Stetson University)
- Delano, California – Columbus Delano
- Delavan, Wisconsin – Edward C. Delavan (temperance leader in Albany, New York)
- Delaware – Thomas West, 3rd Baron De La Warr (note the spelling)
- De Leon, Texas and DeLeon Springs, Florida – Juan Ponce de León
- Denison, Iowa – J.W. Denison (founder)
- Denison, Texas – Rev. C.W. Denison (abolitionist)
- Denmark, South Carolina – B.A. Denmark (railroader)
- Denning, New York – William Denning (land purchaser)
- Dennis, Massachusetts – Josiah Dennis (resident minister)
- Dennison, Ohio – Gov. William Dennison Jr.
- Denton, Maryland – Sir Robert Eden, 1st Baronet, of Maryland (colonial governor) (According to Gannett (1902, p. 92), Denton is a short version of the town's original name, Eden Town).
- Denton, Texas – Capt. John B. Denton
- Denver, Colorado – James W. Denver
- Depauville, New York – Francis Depau (proprietor)
- Depew, New York – Chauncey Depew
- De Peyster, New York – Frederic de Peyster
- DeRidder, Louisiana - Ella de Ridder (1877-1951), sister-in-law of a Dutch railroad financier Jan de Goeijen
- DeSabla, California – Eugene De Sabla (engineer)
- De Smet, Idaho and De Smet, South Dakota – Pierre-Jean De Smet (missionary)
- DeSoto, 4 places in Florida (county), Georgia, Louisiana (parish), and Mississippi (county) – Hernando de Soto
- Devens, Massachusetts – Charles Devens (Civil War general and jurist)
- Devine, Texas – Thomas J. Devine (prominent resident of San Antonio)
- Dewees, Texas – Thomas Dewees and John O. Dewees, Texas cattlemen
- Deweyville, Texas – Admiral George Dewey (victorious in the Battle of Manila Bay)
- DeWitt, Illinois and De Witt, Missouri – DeWitt Clinton (governor of New York)
- DeWitt, New York – Major Moses DeWitt (judge and soldier)
- Dexter, Maine – Samuel Dexter (early statesman)
- Dexter, Michigan – Samuel W. Dexter (settler)
- Dexter, Minnesota – Dexter Parrity (early settler)
- Dexter, New York – S. Newton Dexter (businessman from Whitesboro, New York)
- D'Hanis, Texas – William D'Hanis (land agent for Henri Castro)
- Di Giorgio, California – Joseph Di Giorgio (agricultural entrepreneur)
- Diamondville, California – James Diamond
- Dickey, North Dakota – George H. Dickey (state legislator)
- Dickinson, North Dakota – W.S. Dickinson (founder)
- Dickson, Tennessee – William Dickson
- Dighton, Kansas – Francis Deighton (surveyor) (note the spelling)
- Dighton, Massachusetts – Frances Dighton Williams (wife of Richard Williams, town elder)
- Diller, Nebraska – H.H. Diller (settler)
- Dillon, Montana – Sidney Dillon (railroader)
- Dillon Beach, California – George Dillon (founder)
- Dillsboro, Indiana – Gen. James Dill (settler)
- Dillsboro, North Carolina – George W. Dill (settler)
- Dimond, California – Hugh Dimond (Gold Rush miner and landowner)
- Dinwiddie, Virginia – Robert Dinwiddie (colonial governor)
- District of Columbia – Christopher Columbus
- Dixfield, Maine and Dixmont, Maine – Dr. Elijah Dix (landowner)
- Dixon, California – Thomas Dickson (donor of land for a railroad depot) (error in the address of the first rail shipment to here [Dicksonville] stuck)
- Dixon, Illinois – John Dixon (founder)
- Dixon, Kentucky – Archibald Dixon
- Dixville, New Hampshire – Timothy Dix, Jr. (grantee)
- Dobbins, California – William M. and Mark D. Dobbins (early settlers)
- Dobson, North Carolina – W.P. Dobson (state legislator)
- Dodge Center, Minnesota and Dodgeville, Wisconsin – Gov. Henry Dodge
- Dolph, Oregon – Joseph N. Dolph (U.S. Senator)
- Donaldsonville, Louisiana – William Donaldson
- Doniphan, 3 places in Kansas, Missouri, and Nebraska – Col. Alexander William Doniphan
- Donner, California – Donner Party (ill-fated emigrant group)
- Doolittle, Missouri - Jimmy Doolittle
- Doral, Florida – Alfred Kaskel and his wife Doris Bernstein (1906–1988)
- Dormansville, New York – Daniel Dorman (innkeeper)
- Dougherty, California – James Witt Dougherty (founder)
- Douglas, Massachusetts – Dr. William Douglas (Boston physician)
- Douglas, Wyoming – Stephen A. Douglas
- Douglas Flat, California – Tom Douglas (early merchant)
- Douglass, Kansas – Joseph Douglass (founder)
- Dover-Foxcroft, Maine – Joseph E. Foxcroft (proprietor)
- Downers Grove, Illinois – Pierce Downer (settler)
- Downey, California – John G. Downey
- Downingtown, Pennsylvania – Thomas Downing
- Downs, Kansas – William F. Downs (Atchison resident)
- Downsville, New York – Abel Downs (tanner)
- Doyle, Lassen County, California – Oscar Doyle (landowner)
- Doylestown, Ohio – William Doyle
- Doylestown, Pennsylvania – William Doyle (settler)
- Drakesbad, California – Edward R. Drake (settler and lodge owner)
- Drakesville, Iowa – John A. Drake (founder)
- Dresbach Township, Minnesota – George B. Dresbach (founder)
- Drewry's Bluff, Virginia – Maj. Augustus Drewry
- Dryden, New York – John Dryden
- Duane, New York and Duanesburg, New York – James Duane (grantee)
- DuBois, Pennsylvania – John Dubois (founder)
- Dubuque, Iowa – Julien Dubuque (early resident)
- Dudley, Georgia – Dudley Mays Hughes (U.S. Representative)
- Dudley, Massachusetts – Paul and William Dudley (landowners)
- Duluth, Georgia – Daniel Greysolon, Sieur du Lhut (indirectly, via Duluth, Minnesota)
- Duluth, Minnesota – Daniel Greysolon, Sieur du Lhut
- Dummer, New Hampshire and Dummerston, Vermont – William Dummer (Massachusetts Governor)
- Dumont, Colorado – John M. Dumont (mine operator)
- Dunbar, Nebraska – John Dunbar (landowner)
- Duncombe, Iowa – J.F. Duncombe
- Dunlap, California – George Dunlap Moss (teacher)
- Dunlap, Kansas – Joseph Dunlap (trader and founder)
- Dunlapsville, Indiana – John Dunlap (settler)
- Dunmore, West Virginia – John Murray, 4th Earl of Dunmore (colonial governor)
- Dunnigan, California – A. W. Dunnigan (early settler)
- Dunnsville, New York – Christopher Dunn (landowner)
- Duplin County, North Carolina – Thomas Hay, Viscount Dupplin
- Duquesne, Pennsylvania – Michel-Ange Duquesne de Menneville (indirectly, via Fort Duquesne)
- Durand, Michigan – George H. Durand (U.S. Representative)
- Durand, Wisconsin – Miles Durand Prindle (settler)
- Durant, Iowa – Thomas Durant
- Durham, California – W.W. Durham (member of the California State Assembly)
- Durham, North Carolina – Bartlett S. Durham (landowner)
- Duval County, Florida – William Pope DuVal, Governor of Florida Territory from 1822 to 1834
- Dycusburg, Kentucky – William E. Dycus (founder)
- Dyersburg, Tennessee – Col. Henry Dyer
- Dyersville, Iowa – James Dyer (landowner)

== E ==
- Earling, Iowa – Albert J. Earling, Milwaukee Road officer
- Earl Park, Indiana – Adams Earl (founder)
- Earlville, Iowa – G.M. Earl (settler)
- Earlville, New York – Jonas Earll Jr. (canal commissioner) (note the spelling)
- East Fallowfield Township, Crawford County, Pennsylvania – Lancelot Fallowfield (landowner)
- Eastland, Texas – M.W. Eastland
- Eastman, Georgia – W.P. Eastman
- Easton, Massachusetts – John Easton (colonial governor of Rhode Island)
- East St. Louis, Illinois – Saint Louis
- Eaton, Colorado – Benjamin H. and Aaron J. Eaton (millers)
- Eaton, New Hampshire – Connecticut Governor Theophilus Eaton
- Eaton, New York and Eaton, Ohio – Gen. William Eaton
- Eatonton, Georgia – Gen. William Eaton
- Ebensburg, Pennsylvania – Eben Lloyd (died in childhood)
- Eckley, California – Commodore John L. Eckley
- Eckley, Colorado – Amos Eckles (cattlehand)
- Eddington, Maine – Colonel Jonathan Eddy (officer in the American Revolution)
- Eddyville, Iowa – J.P. Eddy (postmaster)
- Eden, Texas – Fred Ede (landowner)
- Edgartown, Massachusetts – Edgar Stuart, Duke of Cambridge
- Edgecomb, Maine – George Edgcumbe, 1st Earl of Mount Edgcumbe (a supporter of the colonists) (note the spelling)
- Edgerton, Ohio – Alfred Peck Edgerton
- Edgerton, Wisconsin – E.W. Edgerton (settler)
- Edison, 3 places in Georgia, New Jersey, and Ohio – Thomas Edison
- Edmeston, New York – Robert Edmeston (founder)
- Edna, Kansas – Edna Gragery (child who lived there)
- Edroy, Texas – Ed Cubage and Roy Miller (co-founders)
- Edwards, Mississippi – Dick Edwards (Jackson hotelier)
- Edwards, New York – Edward McCormack (founder's brother)
- Edwardsport, Indiana – Edwards Wilkins
- Edwardsville, Illinois – Ninian Edwards (territorial governor)
- Effingham, Illinois and Effingham County, Illinois – Gen. Edward Effingham
- Effingham, Kansas – Effingham Nichols (railroader)
- Effingham, New Hampshire – Howard family, who were Earls of Effingham
- Egremont, Massachusetts – Charles Wyndham, 2nd Earl of Egremont
- Ehrenberg, Arizona – Herman Ehrenberg (founder)
- El Macero, California – Bruce Mace (local landowner)
- Elberton, Georgia and Elbert County, Georgia – Gov. Samuel Elbert
- Elbridge, New York – Elbridge Gerry
- Elizabeth, New Jersey and Elizabethtown, North Carolina – Lady Elizabeth Carteret (wife of colonial proprietor and statesman George Carteret)
- Elizabeth, Pennsylvania – Elizabeth Bayard (founder's wife)
- Elizabeth, West Virginia – Elizabeth Beauchamp
- Elizabeth City, North Carolina – Elizabeth I
- Elizabethton, Tennessee – Elizabeth MacLin Carter and Elizabeth McNabb (wives of two early settlers)
- Elizabethtown, Indiana – Elizabeth Branham (founder's wife)
- Elizabethtown, Kentucky – Elizabeth Hynes (wife of early settler Andrew Hynes)
- Elkader, Iowa – Abd el-Kader (Algerian patriot)
- Elkins, West Virginia – Stephen Benton Elkins (U.S. Senator)
- Ellenburg, New York – Ellen Murray (landowner's daughter)
- Ellendale, Delaware – Ellen Prettyman (founder's wife)
- Ellensburg, Washington – Mary Ellen Shoudy (wife of John A. Shoudy, purchaser of local trading post and founder)
- Ellenville, New York – Ellen Snyder (settler)
- Ellery, New York – William Ellery
- Ellicott, New York and Ellicottville, New York – Joseph Ellicott (agent of the Holland Land Company)
- Ellicott City, Maryland – John, Andrew, and Joseph Ellicott (founders)
- Ellinwood, Kansas – Col. John R. Ellinwood (engineer for the Atchison, Topeka and Santa Fe Railway)
- Ellisburg, New York – Lyman Ellis (founder)
- Ellisville, Mississippi – Powhatan Ellis (U.S. Senator)
- Ellsworth, Kansas – Lt. Allen Ellsworth
- Ellsworth, Maine and Ellsworth, New Hampshire – Chief Justice Oliver Ellsworth
- Elmendorf, Texas – Henry Elmendorf (mayor of San Antonio)
- Elmira, New York – Elmira Teall (tavernkeeper's daughter)
- Elmore, Vermont – Colonel Samuel Elmore (landowner)
- Elsie, Michigan – Elsie Tillotson (pioneer's daughter)
- Elsie, Nebraska – Elsie Perkins
- Elyria, Ohio – Heman Ely (1817)
- Emerick, Nebraska – John Emerick (settler)
- Emery, South Dakota – S.M. Emery (landowner)
- Emeryville, California – Joseph Stickney Emery (local landowner)
- Emlenton, Pennsylvania – Emlen Fox (landowner's wife)
- Emmett, Michigan and Emmetsburg, Iowa – Robert Emmet (Irish nationalist)
- Emmitsburg, Maryland – William Emmitt (founder) (note the spelling)
- Enfield, Massachusetts – Robert Field
- Ennis, Montana – William Ennis (settler)
- Enosburgh, Vermont – Roger Enos (landowner)
- Errol, New Hampshire – James Hay, 15th Earl of Erroll
- Erving, Massachusetts – John Erving (early farmer landowner)
- Erwin, New York – Col. Arthur Erwin
- Eskridge, Kansas – C.V. Eskridge (landowner)
- Essexville, Michigan – Ransom Essex (settler)
- Estes Park, Colorado – Joel Estes (founder)
- Estherville, Iowa – Esther Ridley (landowner's wife)
- Estill, Kentucky – Capt. James Estill
- Estill, Missouri – Col. John R. Estill
- Ethel, Mississippi – Ethel McConnico (1884-1977)
- Euclid, Ohio – Euclid (Greek mathematician)
- Eudora, Kansas – Eudora Fish
- Eugene, Oregon – Eugene Franklin Skinner (settler)
- Eunice, Louisiana – Eunice Pharr Duson (second wife of Curley Duson, the founder of the city)
- Eustis, Maine – Charles L. Eustis (early proprietor)
- Evans, Colorado, Evanston, Illinois, and Evanston, Wyoming – Gov. John Evans
- Evans, New York – David Ellicott Evans (agent of the Holland Land Company)
- Evans Mills, New York – Ethni Evans (mill owner)
- Evansville, Indiana – Robert Morgan Evans (founder)
- Evansville, Wyoming – W.T. Evans (blacksmith)
- Evart, Michigan – Frank Evart (pioneer)
- Everett, Massachusetts and Everett, Pennsylvania – Edward Everett (politician and educator)
- Everett, Washington – Everett Colby (son of Charles Colby, local booster)
- Ewing Township, New Jersey – Charles Ewing (Chief Justice of the New Jersey Supreme Court)

== F ==
- Fairbanks, Alaska – Charles W. Fairbanks
- Fairfax, California – Charles S. Fairfax
- Fairfax, Virginia and Fairfax County, Virginia – Thomas Fairfax, 6th Lord Fairfax of Cameron
- Fallon, California – Luke and James Fallon (early settlers)
- Fallowfield, Pennsylvania – Lancelot Fallowfield (landowner)
- Fannin, Texas – Col. James Fannin (Texian patriot)
- Fannett, Texas – B. J. Fannett (local landowner who opened a general store there in the 1890s)
- Fargo, North Dakota – William Fargo
- Faribault, Minnesota – Jean-Baptiste Faribault (settler)
- Farley, Mendocino County, California – Jackson Farley (early settler)
- Farnham, New York – Le Roy Farnham (merchant)
- Farragut, Iowa and Farragut, Tennessee – David Farragut
- Farrandsville, Pennsylvania – William P. Farrand (founder)
- Farwell, Michigan – Samuel B. Farwell (railroader)
- Fayette, 12 places in Alabama, Indiana, Iowa, Maine, Michigan, Mississippi, Missouri, New York, Ohio, Utah, West Virginia, and Wisconsin – Gilbert du Motier, marquis de La Fayette
- Fayetteville, 11 places in Arkansas, Georgia, Illinois, Indiana, New York, North Carolina, Ohio, Pennsylvania, Tennessee, Texas, and West Virginia – Gilbert du Motier, marquis de La Fayette
- Fayette City, Pennsylvania – Gilbert du Motier, marquis de La Fayette
- Felix Township, Grundy County, Illinois and Felix Township, Grundy County, Iowa – Felix Grundy (U.S. Senator from Tennessee)
- Fellows, California – Charles A. Fellows (railroad contractor)
- Fell's Point, Baltimore, Maryland – William Fell (landowner)
- Felts Mills, New York – John Felt (proprietor)
- Fenner, New York – Rhode Island Governor Arthur Fenner
- Fennville, Michigan – Ethan Fenn (founder)
- Fenton, New York – Governor Reuben Fenton
- Ferdinand, Vermont – from one of the titles for Prince Karl Wilhelm Ferdinand of Brunswick-Lunenburg
- Fernandina Beach, Florida – King Ferdinand VII of Spain
- Ferrisburgh, Vermont – Benjamin Ferris (founder)
- Fields Landing, California – Waterman Field (early settler)
- Fieldville, New Jersey – John Field (early settler)
- Fincastle, Virginia – George Murray, 5th Earl of Dunmore (son of colonial governor Lord Dunmore and also known by the title Lord Fincastle)
- Findlay, Ohio – Col. James Findlay (indirectly, via Fort Findlay)
- Findlay Township, Allegheny County, Pennsylvania – Gov. William Findley (note the spelling)
- Fine, New York – John Fine (landowner)
- Finley, California – Samuel Finley Sylar (early settler)
- Firebaugh, California – Andrew D. Firebaugh
- Firestone, Colorado – Jacob Firestone (landowner)
- Fitchburg, Massachusetts – John Fitch (settler)
- Fithian, Illinois – Dr. William Fithian
- Fitzwilliam, New Hampshire – William Fitzwilliam, 4th Earl Fitzwilliam (cousin of Governor John Wentworth)
- Flagler County, Florida – Henry Flagler, built the Florida East Coast Railway
- Flandreau, South Dakota – Charles Eugene Flandrau
- Fleming, New York – Gen. George Fleming (resident)
- Flemingsburg, Kentucky – Col. John Fleming
- Flora, Mississippi – Flora Jones (resident)
- Florence, Kansas – Florence Crawford
- Florence, Kentucky – Florence Conner (wife of early settler)
- Florence, Omaha, Nebraska – Florence Kilbourn
- Florence, South Carolina – Florence Hartlee (daughter of a railroad president who lived in the area)
- Floresville, Texas – Don Francisco Flores de Abrego (early settler)
- Floyd, Iowa – Charles Floyd (explorer with Lewis and Clark)
- Floyd, New York – William Floyd (Founding Father)
- Floyd, Virginia – John Floyd (Virginia politician)
- Floydada, Texas – Dolphin Floyd (died while defending the Alamo) and Ada Price (wife of a local landholder) (indirectly, via Floyd County, Texas)
- Fluhr, California – C.G. Fluhr (railroad official)
- Fonda, New York – Douw Fonda
- Forbestown, California – B.F. Forbes (local store owner)
- Ford, Kansas – Col. James Hobart Ford
- Forsyth, Georgia – Gov. John Forsyth
- Forsyth, Montana – General James W. Forsyth
- Fort Atkinson, Wisconsin – Gen. Henry Atkinson
- Fort Benton, Montana – Thomas Hart Benton
- Fort Bragg, California - American Army officer and Confederate general Braxton Bragg
- Fort Collins, Colorado – Colonel William O. Collins
- Fort Covington, New York – Gen. Leonard Covington
- Fort Dodge, Iowa – Henry Dodge (U.S. senator from Wisconsin) (indirectly, after the fort named after him)
- Fort Edward (town), New York – Prince Edward, Duke of York and Albany
- Fort Fairfield, Maine – Gov. John Fairfield
- Fort Fetterman, Wyoming – Lt. Col. William J. Fetterman
- Fort Frederica, Georgia – Frederick, Prince of Wales
- Fort Gaines, Alabama and Fort Gaines, Georgia – Gen. Edmund P. Gaines
- Fort Hamilton, New York – Alexander Hamilton
- Fort John, California – John Stuart
- Fort Johnston, North Carolina – Gabriel Johnston, 6th Governor of North Carolina
- Fort Kent, Maine – Edward Kent (governor of Maine)
- Fort Lauderdale, Florida – Major William Lauderdale
- Fort Leavenworth, Kansas – Gen. Henry Leavenworth
- Fort Lee, New Jersey – Charles Lee
- Fort Lupton, Colorado – Lieutenant Lancaster Lupton (built a trading post here)
- Fort Madison, Iowa – James Madison
- Fort Morgan, Colorado – Colonel Christopher A. Morgan
- Fort Myers, Florida and Fort Myers Beach, Florida – Col. Abraham C. Myers
- Fort Pierre, South Dakota – Pierre Chouteau Jr.
- Fort Romie, California – Charles Romie (landowner)
- Fort Scott, Kansas – Gen. Winfield Scott
- Fort Seward, California – William H. Seward
- Fort Sheridan, Illinois – Gen. Philip Sheridan
- Fort Wayne, Indiana – Anthony Wayne
- Fort Worth, Texas – William Jenkins Worth
- Foster, Rhode Island – U.S. Senator Theodore Foster
- Foster City, California - T. Jack Foster (1902-1968)
- Fostoria, Ohio – Gov. Charles Foster
- Fouts Springs, California – John F. Fouts (discoverer of the springs)
- Fowler, California – Thomas Fowler (California State Senator)
- Fowler, Michigan – John N. Fowler
- Fowler, New York – Theodocius Fowler (landowner)
- Fowlerville, Michigan – Ralph Fowler (settler)
- Fowlerville, Livingston County, New York – Wells Fowler (settler)
- Foxburg, Pennsylvania – H.M. Fox (landowner)
- Foxborough, Massachusetts – Charles James Fox
- Francestown, New Hampshire – Frances Deering Wentworth (Governor John Wentworth's wife)
- Franceville, Colorado – Matt France
- Frankfort, Kansas – Frank Schmidt (landowner)
- Frankfort, Kentucky – Benjamin Franklin
- Frankfort (town), New York – Lawrence Frank (settler)
- Franklin – Benjamin Franklin, 36 places in
  - Alabama – Arkansas – Sacramento County, California – Connecticut – Georgia – Idaho – Illinois – Indiana – Iowa – Kentucky – Louisiana – Maine – Massachusetts – Michigan – Minnesota – Missouri – Nebraska – New Hampshire – New Jersey – Franklin County, New York – Macon County, North Carolina – Surry County, North Carolina – Ohio – Cambria County, Pennsylvania – Venango County, Pennsylvania – Tennessee – Texas – Vermont – Virginia – West Virginia – Jackson County, Wisconsin – Kewaunee County, Wisconsin – Manitowoc County, Wisconsin – Milwaukee County, Wisconsin – Sauk County, Wisconsin – Vernon County, Wisconsin
- Franklin, Delaware County, New York – William Temple Franklin
- Franklin Lakes, New Jersey – Benjamin Franklin
- Franklin Park, New Jersey – Benjamin Franklin
- Franklin Township – Benjamin Franklin, 77 places in
  - DeKalb County, Illinois – DeKalb County, Indiana – Floyd County, Indiana – Grant County, Indiana – Harrison County, Indiana – Hendricks County, Indiana – Henry County, Indiana – Johnson County, Indiana – Kosciusko County, Indiana – Marion County, Indiana – Montgomery County, Indiana – Owen County, Indiana – Pulaski County, Indiana – Putnam County, Indiana – Randolph County, Indiana – Ripley County, Indiana – Washington County, Indiana – Wayne County, Indiana – Allamakee County, Iowa – Appanoose County, Iowa – Bremer County, Iowa – Cass County, Iowa – Clarke County, Iowa – Decatur County, Iowa – Story County, Iowa – Bourbon County, Kansas – Edwards County, Kansas – Franklin County, Kansas – Jackson County, Kansas – Clare County, Michigan – Houghton County, Michigan – Lenawee County, Michigan – Wright County, Minnesota – Bergen County, New Jersey – Gloucester County, New Jersey – Hunterdon County, New Jersey – Somerset County, New Jersey – Warren County, New Jersey – Rowan County, North Carolina – Surry County, North Carolina – Adams County, Ohio – Brown County, Ohio – Clermont County, Ohio – Columbiana County, Ohio – Coshocton County, Ohio – Darke County, Ohio – Franklin County, Ohio – Fulton County, Ohio – Harrison County, Ohio – Jackson County, Ohio – Licking County, Ohio – Mercer County, Ohio – Monroe County, Ohio – Morrow County, Ohio – Portage County, Ohio – Richland County, Ohio – Ross County, Ohio – Shelby County, Ohio – Tuscarawas County, Ohio – Warren County, Ohio – Wayne County, Ohio – Adams County, Pennsylvania – Beaver County, Pennsylvania – Bradford County, Pennsylvania – Butler County, Pennsylvania – Carbon County, Pennsylvania – Chester County, Pennsylvania – Columbia County, Pennsylvania – Erie County, Pennsylvania – Fayette County, Pennsylvania – Greene County, Pennsylvania – Huntingdon County, Pennsylvania – Luzerne County, Pennsylvania – Lycoming County, Pennsylvania – Snyder County, Pennsylvania – Susquehanna County, Pennsylvania – York County, Pennsylvania
- Franklinton, Louisiana and Franklinton, North Carolina – Benjamin Franklin
- Frankstown Township, Blair County, Pennsylvania – Stephen Franks (trader)
- Franktown, Colorado – J. Frank Gardner (resident)
- Fraser, Delaware County, New York – Hugh Frazer (landowner) (note the spelling)
- Frederic Township, Michigan – Frederick Barker (pioneer)
- Frederick, Colorado – Frederick A. Clark (landholder)
- Frederick, Maryland – Frederick Calvert, 6th Baron Baltimore
- Fredericksburg, Virginia – Frederick, Prince of Wales
- Fredericktown, Missouri – George Frederick Bollinger (state legislator)
- Frederiksted, U.S. Virgin Islands – Frederick V of Denmark
- Freeborn, Minnesota – William Freeborn (town councillor)
- Freelandville, Indiana – Dr. John F. Freeland
- Freemansburg, Pennsylvania – Jacob Freeman
- Fremont, California, and numerous other Fremonts – John C. Frémont
- Frenchburg, Kentucky – Richard French (judge)
- French Mills, New York – Abel French (factory owner)
- Friant, California – Thomas Friant (lumber company executive)
- Frye Island, Maine – Captain Joseph Frye
- Fryeburg, Maine – Captain Joseph Frye
- Fulford, Colorado – A.H. Fulford (pioneer)
- Fullerton, California – George H. Fullerton (president of the Pacific Land and Improvement Company)
- Fullerton, Nebraska – Randall Fuller (stockman)
- Fulton, South Dakota – Robert Fulton (inventor of the first commercially successful steamboat)
- Funk, Nebraska – P.C. Funk
- Funkstown, Maryland – Jacob Funk (landowner)

== G ==
- Gadsden, Alabama – James Gadsden
- Gagetown, Michigan – James Gage (settler)
- Gaines, New York – Gen. Edmund P. Gaines
- Gainesboro, Tennessee – Gen. Edmund P. Gaines
- Gainesville, 4 places in Florida, Georgia, New York, and Texas – Gen. Edmund P. Gaines
- Galen, New York – Galen
- Galesburg, Illinois – George Washington Gale (founder)
- Galesville, Wisconsin – George Gale (founder)
- Gallatin River – Albert Gallatin
- Gallatin, New York and Gallatin, Tennessee – Albert Gallatin
- Gallaway, Tennessee – J.M. Gallaway (mill owner)
- Gallitzin, Pennsylvania – Pierre Gallitzin (founder)
- Galveston, Texas – Bernardo de Gálvez y Madrid, Count of Gálvez, José de Gálvez, 1st Marquess of Sonora, Matías de Gálvez y Gallardo (Note: Fulmore (1915, pp. 10–12) identifies any of these three as the city's namesake. Gannett (1902, p. 117) identifies only Jose de Galvez.)
- Gambier, Ohio – James Gambier, 1st Baron Gambier (benefactor of Kenyon College)
- Gansevoort, New York – Col. Peter Gansevoort (resident)
- Garberville, California – Jacob C. Garber (first postmaster)
- Gardiner, Maine – Dr. Sylvester Gardiner (Boston physician)
- Gardiner, New York – Lieutenant Governor Addison Gardiner
- Gardiners Island, New York – Lion Gardiner (settler)
- Gardner, Kansas – Henry Gardner, Governor of Massachusetts
- Gardner, Massachusetts – Colonel Thomas Gardner (killed during the Battle of Bunker Hill)
- Garfield, 6 places in Illinois, Kansas, Maine, New Jersey, Mahoning County, Ohio, and Oregon – James A. Garfield
- Garibaldi, Oregon – Giuseppe Garibaldi
- Garland, Maine – Joseph Garland (settler)
- Garland, Texas – Attorney General Augustus Hill Garland
- Garlock, California – Eugene Garlock (early businessman)
- Garnett, Kansas – W.A. Garnett (resident of Louisville, Kentucky)
- Garrett, Indiana and Garrett, Pennsylvania – John W. Garrett (president of the Baltimore and Ohio Railroad)
- Garretson, South Dakota – A. S. Garretson (banker)
- Garrison, Texas – Z.B. Garrison (settler)
- Gary, Indiana – Elbert Henry Gary
- Garysburg, North Carolina – Roderick B. Gary
- Gastonia, North Carolina – William Gaston (judge)
- Gasquet, California – Horace Gasquet (first postmaster)
- Gates, New York and Gatesville, North Carolina – Gen. Horatio Gates
- Gaylesville, Alabama – George W. Gayle
- Gaylord, Kansas – C.E. Gaylord (resident of Marshall County)
- Gayoso, Missouri – Manuel Gayoso de Lemos (colonial governor)
- Geary, Kansas – Gov. John W. Geary
- Geddes, New York – James Geddes (early settler)
- Gene Autry, Oklahoma - Gene Autry, actor and singer
- Gentry, Missouri – Col. Richard Gentry
- George, Washington – George Washington
- George West, Texas – George Washington West (founder)
- Georgetown, California – George Phipps (founder)
- Georgetown, Colorado – George Griffith (clerk of court)
- Georgetown, Delaware – George Mitchell (resident)
- Georgetown, Kentucky and Georgetown, Massachusetts – George Washington
- Georgetown, Maine and Georgetown, South Carolina – George I of Great Britain
- Georgetown, Washington, D.C. – George II of Great Britain
- Georgia (U.S. state) – King George II of Great Britain
- German, New York – Gen. Obadiah German (landowner)
- Gerry, New York – Elbridge Gerry
- Gervais, Oregon – Joseph Gervais (pioneer)
- Gettysburg, Pennsylvania – Samuel Gettys (settler)
- Gibbon River – Gen. John Gibbon
- Gibbon, Oregon – Gen. John Gibbon
- Gibbonsville, Idaho – Gen. John Gibbon
- Gibson, Tennessee – Col. Thomas Gibson
- Gilbert, Arizona – William "Bobby" Gilbert
- Gilberton, Pennsylvania – John Gilbert (mine owner)
- Gilchrist County, Florida – Albert W. Gilchrist Governor of Florida from 1909 to 1913
- Gilford, New Hampshire – S.S. Gillman (settler)
- Gill, Massachusetts – Moses Gill (lieutenant governor of Massachusetts)
- Gillette, Wyoming – Weston Gillette (surveyor and civil engineer)
- Gilman, Colorado – H.H. Gilman (resident)
- Gilsum, New Hampshire – Samuel Gilbert and his son-in-law, Thomas Sumner (proprietors)
- Girard, Pennsylvania – Stephen Girard
- Girardville, Pennsylvania – Stephen Girard
- Gladstone, Michigan and Gladstone, North Dakota – William Ewart Gladstone
- Gladwin, Michigan – Maj. Henry Gladwin
- Glen, New York – Jacob Glen (resident)
- Glen Burnie, Maryland – Elias Glenn (district attorney) and his descendants
- Glens Falls, New York – John Glenn (discoverer)
- Glennville, California – James M. Glenn (blacksmith)
- Glocester, Rhode Island – Henry Stuart, Duke of Gloucester (note spelling)
- Glover, Vermont – Brigadier General John Glover (proprietor)
- Goddard, Kansas – J.F. Goddard (manager of the Atchison, Topeka and Santa Fe Railway)
- Godfrey, Illinois – Capt. Benjamin Godfrey
- Goff, Kansas – Edward H. Goff
- Goffstown, New Hampshire – Colonel John Goffe (settler) (note spelling)
- Goldsboro, North Carolina – M.T. Goldsboro
- Goodhue, Minnesota – James M. Goodhue (journalist)
- Gorham, Maine and Gorham, New Hampshire – Captain John Gorham (The town in New Hampshire was named for the one in Maine).
- Gorham, New York – Nathaniel Gorham
- Gorman Township, Otter Tail County, Minnesota – Gov. Willis A. Gorman
- Gosnold, Massachusetts – Bartholomew Gosnold (settler)
- Gouldsboro, Maine – Robert Gould (landholder)
- Gouverneur, New York – Gouverneur Morris
- Gove City, Kansas – Capt. Grenville L. Gove
- Governors Island (Massachusetts) – Gov. John Winthrop (landowner)
- Governors Island (New York) – Gov. Wouter van Twiller (landowner)
- Grafton, Massachusetts – Charles FitzRoy, 2nd Duke of Grafton
- Grafton, New Hampshire – Augustus FitzRoy, 3rd Duke of Grafton (relative of colonial governor Benning Wentworth)
- Graham, North Carolina – William Alexander Graham (U.S. Senator)
- Granby, Massachusetts – John Manners, Marquess of Granby (hero of the Seven Years' War)
- Granby, Vermont – Marquis of Granby
- Granger, Washington – Walter Granger (superintendent of the Washington Irrigation Company)
- Grant, 4 places in Humboldt County, California, Iowa, Kansas, and Nebraska – Ulysses S. Grant
- Grantsville, West Virginia – Ulysses S. Grant
- Grantham, New Hampshire – Thomas Robinson, 1st Baron Grantham
- Gratiot, Wisconsin – Col. Henry Gratiot
- Grattan Township, Michigan – Henry Grattan
- Gravette, Arkansas – E.T. Gravette
- Gray, Maine – Thomas Gray (proprietor)
- Grays Harbor, Washington – Capt. Robert Gray (explorer)
- Grayson, Kentucky – Col. Robert Grayson
- Graysville, Indiana – Joe Gray (founder)
- Great Barrington, Massachusetts – William Barrington, 2nd Viscount Barrington
- Greeley, Colorado and Greeley, Kansas – Horace Greeley (editor of the New York Tribune)
- Greeley Center, Nebraska – Peter Greeley
- Greene, Iowa – George Green (judge) (note the spelling)
- Greene, Maine and Greene, New York – Nathanael Greene
- Greeneville, Tennessee – Nathanael Greene
- Greenleaf, Kansas – A.W. Greenleaf (treasurer of the Union Pacific Railroad)
- Greensboro, North Carolina – Nathanael Greene
- Greensboro, Vermont – Timothy Green (landowner)
- Greensburg, Kansas – Col. D.R. Green
- Greenup, Kentucky – Gov. Christopher Greenup
- Greenville, Kentucky and Greenville, North Carolina – Nathanael Greene
- Greenville, Michigan – John Green (settler)
- Greenwood, Arkansas – Moses Greenwood (merchant)
- Greenwood, El Dorado County, California – John Greenwood (early settler)
- Greenwood, Mississippi – Greenwood LeFlore (Choctaw chief)
- Greenwood, Nebraska – J.S. Green (settler)
- Greig, New York – John Greig (U.S. representative)
- Grestley, California – James Grestley
- Gridley, California – George W. Gridley (founder)
- Gridley, Illinois – Asahel Gridley
- Griffin, Georgia – Gen. Lewis Lawrence Griffin (president of the Macon and Western Railroad)
- Grimes, Iowa – James W. Grimes (U.S. Senator)
- Grimesland, North Carolina – Gen. Bryan Grimes
- Grinnell, Iowa – W.H. Grinnell (resident)
- Griswold, Connecticut – Governor Roger Griswold
- Grover, North Carolina and Grover, South Carolina – Grover Cleveland
- Grundy Center, Iowa – Felix Grundy (U.S. Senator from Tennessee)
- Guilford, Maine – Moses Guilford Law (first white child born here)
- Guilford, Vermont – Francis North, 1st Earl of Guilford
- Gunnison, Colorado – Capt. John Williams Gunnison (explorer)
- Gunnison Island, Utah – Capt. John Williams Gunnison (explorer)
- Gunnison River – Capt. John Williams Gunnison (explorer)
- Guntown, Mississippi – James G. Gunn (early settler)
- Gurnee, Illinois – Walter S. Gurnee (mayor of Chicago)
- Gustine, California – Augusta Miller, daughter of Henry Miller (rancher)
- Guthrie Center, Iowa – Capt. Edwin B. Guthrie
- Guttenberg, Iowa and Guttenberg, New Jersey – Johannes Gutenberg (note the spelling)
- Gwinn, Michigan - William G. Mather

== H ==
- Hackettstown, New Jersey – Samuel Hackett (early settler)
- Haddonfield, New Jersey – Elizabeth Haddon) (landowner)
- Haddon Township, New Jersey – Elizabeth Haddon (landowner)
- Hagerstown, Maryland – Jonathan Hager
- Hahns Peak and Hahns Peak Village, Colorado – Joe Hahn (settler)
- Halcott, New York – George W. Halcott (sheriff)
- Hale, Missouri – John P. Hale (Carrollton resident)
- Halifax, Massachusetts and Halifax, Vermont – George Montagu-Dunk, 2nd Earl of Halifax
- Hallowell, Maine – Benjamin Hallowell (landowner)
- Hallstead, Pennsylvania – William F. Hallstead (general manager of the Delaware, Lackawanna and Western Railroad)
- Hallsville, New York – Capt. Robert Hall
- Hallsville, Texas – Robert Burton Hall (railroader)
- Halstead, Kansas – Murat Halstead (journalist)
- Hamden, Connecticut – John Hampden (English statesman) (note spelling)
- Hamersville, Ohio – Gen. Thomas L. Hamer
- Hamilton, Georgia – James Hamilton Jr. (Governor of South Carolina)
- Hamilton, Massachusetts and Hamilton, Ohio – Alexander Hamilton
- Hamilton, Montana – J.W. Hamilton (provided the right-of-way to the railroad)
- Hamilton City, California – J.G. Hamilton (sugar company president)
- Hamilton County, 7 places in Florida, Illinois, Indiana, Kansas, New York, Ohio, and Tennessee – Alexander Hamilton
- Hamlin, Kansas – Vice President Hannibal Hamlin
- Hammond, Illinois – Charles Goodrich Hamilton (railroader)
- Hammond, Indiana – George H. Hammond (Detroit butcher who founded a meat-packing plant here)
- Hammond, New York – Abijah Hammond (landowner)
- Hammonton, California – W.P. Hammond (gold mine official)
- Hampden, Maine and Hampden, Massachusetts – John Hampden (English patriot)
- Hampton, South Carolina – Gen. Wade Hampton I
- Hancock, 6 places in Maine, Massachusetts, Michigan, New Hampshire, New York, and Vermont – John Hancock
- Hanford, California – James Madison Hanford (railroad executive)
- Hankamer, Texas – I. A. Hankamer (early settler)
- Hannibal, Missouri and Hannibal, New York – Hannibal
- Hanson, Massachusetts – Alexander C. Hanson (Maryland newspaper publisher and U.S. Senator)
- Haralson, Georgia and Haralson County, Georgia – Gen. Hugh A. Haralson (U.S. representative)
- Harbeson, Delaware – Harbeson Hickman (landowner)
- Harbin Springs, California – James M. Harbin (discoverer of the springs)
- Harbine, Nebraska – Col. John Harbine
- Hardenburgh, New York – Johannes Hardenburgh (landowner)
- Hardin, Missouri – Gov. Charles Henry Hardin
- Hardin, Montana – Samuel Hardin (friend of developer Charles Henry Morrill)
- Hardinsburg, Kentucky – Capt. William Hardin (pioneer)
- Hardwick, Massachusetts – Philip Yorke, 1st Earl of Hardwicke (note the spelling)
- Harlan, Iowa – James Harlan (United States Senator)
- Harlan, Kansas – John C. Harlan (settler)
- Harlan, Kentucky – Maj. Silas Harlan
- Harlowton, Montana – Richard A. Harlow (president of the Montana Railroad)
- Harney, Oregon – Gen. William S. Harney
- Harpers Ferry, West Virginia – Robert Harper (ferry owner)
- Harpersfield, New York – Joseph Harper (landowner)
- Harperville, Mississippi – G.W. Harper (resident)
- Harrietstown, New York – Harriet Duane (wife of James Duane)
- Harriman, New York – E. H. Harriman (president of the Union Pacific Railroad)
- Harrington, Delaware – Samuel M. Harrington (judge)
- Harrisburg, Inyo County, California – Shorty Harris (gold discoverer)
- Harrisburg, New York – Richard Harrison
- Harrisburg, Pennsylvania – John Harris, Sr. (founder)
- Harrison, Maine – Harrison Gray Otis (landowner)
- Harrison, New Jersey – William Henry Harrison
- Harrison, New York – John Harrison (Quaker leader)
- Harrison Township, New Jersey – William Henry Harrison
- Harrisonburg, Virginia – Thomas Harrison (early settler who founded the community)
- Harrisville, New Hampshire – Milan Harris (mill owner)
- Harrisville, New York – Fosket Harris (settler)
- Harrisville, Ohio – Meigs Harris (pioneer)
- Harrisville, West Virginia – Thomas Harris
- Harrodsburg, Kentucky – Col. James Harrod (settler)
- Hart's Location, New Hampshire – Colonel John Hart
- Hartsville, Indiana – Gideon B. Hart (pioneer)
- Hartwick, New York – Christopher Hartwick (landowner)
- Harvard, Illinois – John Harvard (indirectly, via Harvard University)
- Harvard, Massachusetts – John Harvard
- Hastings, Michigan – Eurotas Hastings (state auditor)
- Hathaway Pines, California – Robert B. Hathaway (first postmaster)
- Hattiesburg, Mississippi – Hattie Hardy (wife of pioneer lumberman and civil engineer William H. Hardy)
- Haugan, Montana – H. G. Haugan (land commissioner of the Chicago, Milwaukee, St. Paul and Pacific Railroad)
- Havensville, Kansas – Paul E. Havens (Leavenworth resident)
- Hawesville, Kentucky – Richard Hawes (U.S. representative)
- Hawkeye, Iowa – Chief Hawkeye
- Hawley, Massachusetts – Joseph Hawley (local leader in the American Revolution)
- Hawthorne, New Jersey – Nathaniel Hawthorne
- Hayden, Colorado – Ferdinand Vandeveer Hayden (geologist)
- Hayden Hill, California – Ferdinand Vandeveer Hayden (geologist)
- Hayes, California – William J. Hayes (first postmaster)
- Hayesville, North Carolina – George W. Hayes (state senator)
- Hays, Kansas – Gen. William Hays
- Hayward, California – William Dutton Hayward (early settler)
- Hayward, Minnesota – David Hayward (settler)
- Hazard, Kentucky – Commodore Oliver Hazard Perry (hero of the War of 1812)
- Hazardville, Connecticut – Colonel Augustus George Hazard (gunpowder manufacturer)
- Hazelton, California – Hazelton Blodget (son of Hugh A. Blodget, oilman)
- Hazelton, Kansas – Rev. J.H. Hazelton (founder)
- Hazelton, North Dakota - Hazel Roop (1897-1987),
- Hazelrigg, Indiana – H.G. Hazlerigg (founder) (note the spelling)
- Healdsburg, California – Col. Harmon Heald (settler)
- Hearst, California – George Hearst
- Heath, Massachusetts – General William Heath
- Heber, California – A.H. Heber (development company president)
- Heber City, Utah – Heber C. Kimball (Mormon leader)
- Heceta Beach, Oregon – Bruno de Heceta (explorer)
- Helena, New York – Helena Pitcairn
- Helm, California – William Helm (early rancher)
- Henderson, Nevada – U.S. Senator Charles B. Henderson
- Henderson, Kentucky and Henderson, Tennessee – Col. Richard Henderson
- Henderson, Nebraska – David Henderson (settler)
- Henderson, New York – William Henderson (landowner)
- Hendersonville, North Carolina – North Carolina Chief Justice Leonard Henderson
- Hendry County, Florida – Major Francis A. Hendry
- Hennepin, Illinois – Louis Hennepin (explorer)
- Hennessey, Oklahoma – Pat Hennessey (freighter)
- Henniker, New Hampshire – John Henniker, 1st Baron Henniker
- Henrietta, New York – Laura Pulteney, 1st Countess of Bath
- Henrietta, North Carolina – Henrietta Tanner
- Hensley, Arkansas – William B. Hensley (founder and landowner)
- Hepburn, Iowa – William Peters Hepburn (U.S. representative)
- Hepler, Kansas – B.F. Hepler (resident of Fort Scott)
- Herington, Kansas – M.D. Herington (founder)
- Herkimer, New York – Nicholas Herkimer (militia general in the American Revolutionary War)
- Herlong, California – Capt. Henry W. Herlong (World War II casualty)
- Herman, Nebraska – Samuel Herman (railroad conductor)
- Hermann, Missouri – Arminius (Germanic chief)
- Hernando, Mississippi – Hernando de Soto
- Hernando County, Florida – Hernando de Soto
- Hershey, Pennsylvania – Milton S. Hershey (Chocolatier)
- Hertford County, North Carolina – Francis Seymour-Conway, 1st Marquess of Hertford (Note: There is also a town in North Carolina called Hertford. Gannett (1902, p. 135) identifies the Marquess as this town's namesake as well, while Powell & Hill (2010, p. 238) identify the namesake of the town as the town in England.)
- Heuvelton, New York – Jacob van Heuvel
- Hewes Point, Maine – Paola Hewes (settler)
- Heyburn, Idaho – Senator Weldon Brinton Heyburn
- Hickman, Kentucky – Capt. Paschal Hickman
- Hickory, Mississippi and Hickory, North Carolina – Andrew Jackson (nicknamed "Old Hickory")
- Hicksville, New York – Charles Hicks (Quaker cleric)
- Hicksville, Ohio – Henry W. Hicks (founder)
- Hildreth, California – Tom Hildreth (founder and merchant)
- Higginsport, Ohio – Col. Robert Higgins (founder)
- Hildebran, North Carolina – Pope Gregory VII (né Hildebrand)
- Hill, New Hampshire – Isaac Hill (governor of New Hampshire)
- Hillrose, Colorado – Rose Hill Emerson (daughter of early landholder)
- Hillsboro, Kansas – John G. Hill (mayor)
- Hillsborough, New Hampshire and Hillsborough, North Carolina – Sir Wills Hill, 1st Marquess of Downshire and 1st Earl of Hillsborough
- Hillsborough County, Florida – Sir Wills Hill, 1st Marquess of Downshire and 1st Earl of Hillsborough
- Hinesburg, Vermont – Abel Hine (town clerk)
- Hinesville, Georgia – Charlton Hines
- Hinsdale, Massachusetts – Rev. Theodore Hinsdale (woolen mill owner)
- Hinsdale, New Hampshire – Colonel Ebenezer Hinsdale
- Hinsdale, New York – Colonel Ebenezer Hinsdale (indirectly, via Hinsdale, New Hampshire)
- Hiram, Maine – Hiram I (biblical king of Tyre)
- Hobart, New York – Bishop John Henry Hobart
- Hobergs, California – Gustave Hoberg (founder, resort owner)
- Hodgdon, Maine – John Hodgdon (landowner)
- Hodgenville, Kentucky – Robert Hodgen
- Hodson, California – J.J. Hodson (copper mining financier)
- Hoffman Estates, Illinois – Sam and Jack Hoffman (builders)
- Hoisington, Kansas – A.J. Hoisington (resident of Great Bend)
- Holbrook, Massachusetts – Elisha N. Holbrook (benefactor)
- Holden, Massachusetts – Samuel Holden (banker)
- Holderness, New Hampshire – Robert Darcy, 4th Earl of Holderness
- Holland, Massachusetts – Henry Fox, 1st Baron Holland (English statesman)
- Holland Patent, New York – Henry Fox, 1st Baron Holland (landowner)
- Holley, New York – Myron Holley (canal commissioner)
- Holliday, Missouri – Samuel Holliday (resident of St. Louis)
- Hollidaysburg, Pennsylvania – Adam and William Holliday (founders)
- Hollis, New Hampshire – John Holles, Earl of Clare (ancestor of colonial governor Benning Wentworth) (note the spelling)
- Holliston, Massachusetts – Thomas Hollis, Esq. of London, England (a benefactor of Harvard College)
- Holmesville, Nebraska – L.M. Holmes (founder)
- Holmesville, Ohio – Maj. Andrew Holmes
- Holt, Missouri – Jerry Holt (landowner)
- Holton, Kansas – Edward Holton
- Holts Summit, Missouri – Timothy Holt
- Holyoke, Massachusetts — Elizur Holyoke, (colonist, scribe and surveyor)
- Homer, New York – Homer (Greek poet)
- Honesdale, Pennsylvania – Philip Dale (canal builder)
- Hood River, Oregon – Alexander Hood, 1st Viscount Bridport
- Hookstown, Pennsylvania – Matthias Hook (resident)
- Hookton, California – John Hookton (founder)
- Hoover, Alabama – William H. Hoover (1890–1979), a local insurance of Alabama
- Hoover, Indiana – Riley Hoover (founder)
- Hoover Town, West Virginia – Herbert Hoover
- Hopkinsville, Kentucky – General Samuel Hopkins
- Hopkinton, Massachusetts – Edward Hopkins (benefactor of Harvard University)
- Hopkinton, New Hampshire – Edward Hopkins (benefactor of Harvard University) (indirectly, via Hopkinton, Massachusetts)
- Hopkinton, New York – Roswell Hopkins (settler)
- Hopkinton, Rhode Island – Gov. Stephen Hopkins
- Horace, Kansas – Horace Greeley
- Hornbeak, Tennessee – Frank Hornbeak (store owner, postmaster)
- Hornby, New York – John Hornby (landowner)
- Hornellsville, New York – George Hornell (settler)
- Hornersville, Missouri – William H. Horner (founder)
- Horstville, California – E. Clemons Horst (rancher)
- Horton, Kansas – A.H. Horton (judge)
- Houlton, Maine – Joseph Houlton (settler)
- Hounsfield, New York – Ezra Hounsfield (landowner)
- Houston, Delaware – John W. Houston
- Houston, Minnesota, Houston, Mississippi, and Houston, Texas – Sam Houston
- Houstonia, Missouri – Sam Houston
- Howard, Kansas – General Oliver Otis Howard
- Howard, Brown County, Wisconsin and Howard, Chippewa County, Wisconsin – Brigadier General Benjamin Howard (officer in the War of 1812)
- Howard Springs, California – C.W. Howard (resort owner)
- Howards Grove, Wisconsin – H.B. Howard (hotelier and postmaster)
- Howell, Evansville, Indiana – Capt. Lee Howell (railroader)
- Howell Township, New Jersey – Gov. Richard Howell
- Howland, Maine – John Howland (Mayflower passenger)
- Hoxie, Kansas – H.M. Hoxie (general manager of the Missouri Pacific Railroad)
- Hubbard, Nebraska – Asahel W. Hubbard (judge)
- Hubbardston, Massachusetts – Thomas Hubbard (Massachusetts Speaker of the House of Representatives and landowner)
- Hubbardton, Vermont – Thomas Hubbard (landholder)
- Hudson, Maine – Charles Hudson (indirectly, via Hudson, Massachusetts)
- Hudson, Massachusetts – Charles Hudson (United States Representative)
- Hudson, New York – Henry Hudson
- Hudson, Ohio – David Hudson (settler)
- Hudson River – Henry Hudson
- Hugoton, Kansas – Victor Hugo
- Hull, Iowa – John Hull
- Humble, Texas – Pleasant Smith "Plez" Humble (postmaster)
- Humboldt, Kansas and Humboldt, South Dakota – Alexander von Humboldt (German scientist, explorer and diplomat)
- Hummelstown, Pennsylvania – Frederick Hummel (founder)
- Humphrey, New York – Charles Humphrey (state legislator)
- Humphreys Station, California – John W. Humphreys (pioneer)
- Humphreysville, Connecticut – David Humphreys
- Hunnewell, Kansas and Hunnewell, Missouri – H.H. Hunnewell (banker)
- Hunter, New York – John Hunter (landowner)
- Huntingdon, Pennsylvania – Selena Hastings, Countess of Huntingdon
- Huntingdon, Tennessee – Memucan Hunt (landowner)
- Huntington, Massachusetts – Charles P. Huntington
- Huntington, Oregon – J.B. Huntington (landowner)
- Huntington, Vermont – Josiah, Charles and Marmaduke Hunt (landholders)
- Huntington, West Virginia – Collis P. Huntington
- Huntington Beach, California – Henry E. Huntington
- Huntley, Montana – S.O. Huntley (partner in the stagecoach firm of Clark & Huntley)
- Huntsville, Alabama – John Hunt (settler)
- Huntsville, Missouri – David Hunt (settler)
- Hurley, New York – Francis Lovelace, Baron Hurley of Ireland
- Hustisford, Wisconsin – John Hustis (settler)
- Hutchinson, Kansas – C.C. Hutchinson (founder)
- Hyannis, Massachusetts – Iyannough (sachem of the Cummaquid Native American tribe)
- Hyde Park, Vermont – Captain Jedediah Hyde (landowner)
- Hydesville, California – John Hyde (local landowner)
- Hysham, Montana – Charlie J. Hysham (cattleman)

== I ==
- Iliff, Colorado – John Wesley Iliff (cattleman)
- Ingalls, Oklahoma – John James Ingalls (U.S. Senator from Kansas)
- Inman, Kansas – Maj. Henry Inman
- Inman, Nebraska – W.H. Inman (settler)
- Iola, Kansas – Iola Colborn
- Ira, Vermont – Ira Allen (one of the Green Mountain Boys and brother of Ethan Allen)
- Irasburg, Vermont – Ira Allen (landholder, one of the Green Mountain Boys and brother of Ethan Allen)
- Ireland, Texas - John Ireland
- Irvine, California – James Irvine I (landowner)
- Irvine, Kentucky – Col. William Irvine
- Irving, Kansas – Washington Irving
- Irving Park, Chicago - Washington Irving
- Irvington, New Jersey and Irvington, New York – Washington Irving
- Irwin, California – W.A. Irwin (founder)
- Irwinton, Georgia – Gov. Jared Irwin
- Isabella, California, Isabella County, Michigan & Isabella Township, Michigan - Isabella I of Castile
- Isle La Motte, Vermont – Captain La Motte (established Fort Sainte Anne on this island)
- Ives Grove, Wisconsin - Joseph Ives

== J ==
- Jackson, California – Colonel Alden Jackson
- Jackson, Maine – General Henry Jackson
- Jackson, Burnett County, Wisconsin – Stonewall Jackson
- Jackson, Wyoming – Davey Jackson
- Jackson – Andrew Jackson, 14 places in
  - Alabama – Georgia – Kentucky – Louisiana – Michigan – Minnesota (Note: May also have been named for Henry Jackson, a merchant from St. Paul. See Upham (1920, p. 260).) – Mississippi – Missouri – New Hampshire – New Jersey – New York – Ohio – Tennessee – Washington County, Wisconsin
- Jacksonville, Arkansas – Nicholas and Elizabeth Jackson (landowners)
- Jacksonville, Texas – Jackson Smith (soldier)
- Jacksonville – Andrew Jackson, 7 places in
  - Alabama – Florida – Illinois – Missouri – North Carolina – Oregon – Pennsylvania
- Jacobs Corner, California – Mattie Jacobs (first postmaster)
- Jaffrey, New Hampshire – George Jaffrey (member of a wealthy Portsmouth family)
- Jamesburg, California – John James (founder)
- Jamestown, Indiana – James Mattock (founder)
- Jamestown, Kansas – James P. Pomeroy (railroader)
- Jamestown, New York – James Prendergast (settler)
- Jamestown, Rhode Island – James II of England
- Jamestown, Virginia – James I of England
- Jamesville, New York – James De Witt
- Janesville, California – Jane Bankhead (early settler)
- Janesville, Wisconsin – Henry Janes (early settler and first postmaster)
- Jasonville, Indiana – Jason Rogers (founder)
- Jasper, 3 places in Georgia, New York, and Texas – William Jasper (American Revolution hero)
- Jay, Maine, Jay, New York, and Jay, Vermont – John Jay (the first chief justice of the Supreme Court)
- Jayem, Kentucky - John M. Robsion
- Jean, Nevada – Jean Fayle (wife of postmaster George Fayle)
- Jeffrey City, Wyoming - Dr. Charles W. Jeffrey (1882–1973)
- Jefferson, Maine, Jefferson, New Jersey, and Jefferson, New Hampshire – Thomas Jefferson
- Jefferson City, Missouri – Thomas Jefferson
- Jefferson County, Thomas Jefferson, 19 places in
  - Arkansas – Colorado – Florida – Georgia – Illinois – Indiana – Iowa – Kansas – Kentucky – Mississippi – Missouri – Montana – New York – Pennsylvania – Tennessee – Washington – West Virginia – Wisconsin
- Jeffersonville, Georgia – Thomas Jefferson
- Jekyll Island, Georgia – Sir Joseph Jekyll
- Jenny Lind, California – Jenny Lind
- Jeromesville, Ohio – John Baptiste Jerome (trader)
- Jesup, Iowa – Morris Ketchum Jesup
- Jesus Maria, California – Jesus Maria (local farmer)
- Jetmore, Kansas – Col. A.B. Jetmore
- Jewell, California – Omar Jewell (local rancher)
- Jewell, Kansas – Lt. Col. Lewis R. Jewell
- Jewett, New York – Freeborn G. Jewett (judge)
- Jewett, Ohio – T.M. Jewett (railroader)
- Jim Thorpe, Pennsylvania – Jim Thorpe
- Joaquin, Texas – Joaquin Morris (grandson of Benjamin Franklin Morris, who donated the land for the site)
- Joe, Montana – Joe Montana
- Joe Walker Town, California – Joe Walker
- Johnsburg, New York – John Thurman (settler)
- Johnson, Nebraska – Julius A. Johnson (landowner)
- Johnson, Vermont – William Samuel Johnson (landowner)
- Johnson City, Kansas – Col. Alexander S. Johnson
- Johnson City, New York — George F. Johnson
- Johnsondale, California - Walter S. Johnson
- Johnston, Rhode Island – Augustus Johnston (colonial attorney general)
- Johnston County, North Carolina – Gabriel Johnston, 6th Governor of North Carolina
- Johnstonville, California – Robert Johnston (town developer)
- Johnstown, Colorado – John Parish (father of Harvey J. Parish, who platted the town)
- Johnstown (city), New York – Sir William Johnson, 1st Baronet (founder)
- Johnstown, Pennsylvania – Joseph Jahns (settler) (note the spelling)
- Joliet, Illinois – Louis Jolliet (note the spelling)
- Jonesboro, Maine – John Coffin Jones (landholder)
- Jonesborough, Tennessee – William Jones (statesman)
- Jonesport, Maine – John Coffin Jones (landholder)
- Jonesville, Indiana – Benjamin Jones (founder)
- Jonesville, Virginia – Frederick Jones (landowner)
- Joplin, Missouri – Rev. H.G. Joplin (resident) (indirectly, via Joplin Creek)
- Joplin Creek, Missouri – Rev. H.G. Joplin (resident)
- Jordan, Montana – Arthur Jordan (founder)
- Judith River – Judith Hancock
- Judsonia, Arkansas – Rev. Adoniram Judson (missionary)
- Judsonville, California – Egbert Judson (part owner of local mine)
- Julesburg, Colorado – Jules Beni (established a trading post here)
- Jump-off Joe – Joe McLaughlin (trapper)
- Juneau, Alaska – Joe Juneau (prospector)
- Juneau, Wisconsin – Solomon Juneau (founder of Milwaukee)

== K ==
- Kamrar, Iowa – J.L. Kamrar (judge)
- Kanawyers, California – Peter Apoleon Kanawyer (founder)
- Kaneville, Illinois – Gen. Thomas L. Kane (Note: Possibly also Elias Kent Kane, for whom Kane County was named. (Kaneville is in Kane County).)
- Karnes City, Texas – Henry Karnes (Texas patriot)
- Kaufman, Texas – David S. Kaufman (U.S. representative)
- Kearney, Missouri – Charles E. Kearney, the president of the Hannibal and Saint Joseph Railroad
- Kearney, Nebraska – Gen. Philip Kearny (note the spelling)
- Kearny, New Jersey – Gen. Philip Kearny
- Keene, California – James R. Keene (financier)
- Keene, New Hampshire – Sir Benjamin Keene (English minister to Spain and West Indies trader)
- Keenesburg, Colorado – Les Keene (settler)
- Keeseville, New York – Richard Keese (founder)
- Keizer, Oregon – Thomas Dove Keizur
- Kelleys Island, Ohio – Datus and Irad Kelly (landowners) (note the spelling)
- Kellogg, Idaho – Noah Kellogg (prospector)
- Kelsey, California – Benjamin Kelsey (founder)
- Kelso, California – Napoleon B. Kelso (first postmaster)
- Kenansville, North Carolina – James Kenan (U.S. representative)
- Kendall, New York – Postmaster General Amos Kendall
- Kennard, Nebraska – Thomas P. Kennard (secretary of state of Nebraska)
- Kenedy, Texas – Mifflin Kenedy (rancher, steamboat owner and railroad investor)
- Kenner, Louisiana – Duncan F. Kenner (lawyer)
- Kensington, New Hampshire – Edward Rich, 8th Earl of Warwick and Baron Kensington (owner of Kensington Palace in London)
- Kent, Ohio – Marvin Kent
- Kentfield, California – Albert Emmet Kent (landowner)
- Kenton, Ohio – Gen. Simon Kenton
- Keough Hot Springs, California – Philip P. Keough (resort owner)
- Keokuk, Iowa – Keokuk (Sauk leader)
- Kerman, California – W.G. Kerckhoff and Jacob Mansar (promoters)
- Kettleman City, California – Dave Kettleman (early rancher)
- Keyesville, California – Richard M. Keyes (gold discoverer in Kern County)
- Kiester, Minnesota – Jacob Kiester (county historian)
- Kilbourn City, Wisconsin – Byron Kilbourn (pioneer)
- Kilbuck Township, Allegheny County, Pennsylvania – chieftain of the Lenape
- Kimball, South Dakota – J.W. Kimball (surveyor)
- Kincaid, Kansas – Robert Kincaid (resident of Mound City)
- King City, California – Charles King (founder)
- King County, Washington - Rev. Dr. Martin Luther King (originally for Vice President William R. King)
- King of Prussia, Pennsylvania – after a local tavern named after Frederick II of Prussia
- Kingfield, Maine – William King (future governor of Maine)
- Kingman, Kansas – Samuel Austin Kingman (judge)
- Kingman, Maine – R.S. Kingman
- Kingsbury Plantation, Maine – Judge Sanford Kingsbury (landowner)
- Kingsley, Michigan – Judson Kingsley (landowner)
- Kingston, Georgia – J.P. King (resident of Augusta)
- Kingston, Massachusetts – Evelyn Pierrepont, 1st Duke of Kingston-upon-Hull
- Kingston, Missouri – Gov. Austin Augustus King
- Kingsville, Missouri – Gen. William M. King (resident)
- Kingsville, Texas – Captain Richard King (owner of the King Ranch)
- Kinman Pond, California – Seth Kinman (settler)
- Kinsley, Kansas – W.E.W. Kinsley (resident of Boston, Massachusetts)
- Kinston, North Carolina – George III
- Kirbyville, Texas – John Henry Kirby (lumber businessman)
- Kirkland, New York – Rev. Samuel Kirkland
- Kirklin, Indiana – Nathan Kirk (founder)
- Kirksville, Missouri – Jesse Kirk
- Kirkwood, California – Zack Kirkwood (rancher and early settler)
- Kirkwood, Delaware and Kirkwood, Ohio – Maj. Robert Kirkwood (officer in the American Revolutionary War)
- Kirtland, Ohio – Turhand Kirtland (principal of the Connecticut Land Company)
- Kirwin, Kansas – Col. John Kirwin
- Kiryas Joel, New York – Joel Teitelbaum (rabbi of Satmar)
- Kit Carson, California and Kit Carson, Colorado – Kit Carson
- Klej Grange, Maryland – Katherine (1866-1918), Lucy (1867-1943), Elizabeth (1868-1944), and Josephine Drexel (1878-1966) (daughters of Joseph William Drexel)
- Kneeland, California – John A. and Tom Kneeland (first settlers)
- Knights Landing, California – Dr. William Knight (early settler)
- Knightsen, California – George W. Knight (town founder) and his wife Christina Christensen
- Knightsville, Indiana – A.W. Knight (founder)
- Knowles, California – F.E. Knowles (granite quarry owner)
- Knox, Maine – General Henry Knox
- Knoxville, California – Ranar B. Knox, first postmaster
- Knoxville, 4 places in Georgia, Mississippi, Albany County, New York, and Tennessee – Henry Knox
- Knoxville, Pennsylvania – John C. Knox (judge)
- Kokomo, Indiana – Ma-Ko-Ko-Mo (Miami tribal chief)
- Kortright, New York – Lawrence Kortright (patentee)
- Kosciusko, Mississippi – Tadeusz Kościuszko
- Kossuth, Mississippi and Kossuth, Ohio – Lajos Kossuth
- Kotzebue, Alaska – Otto von Kotzebue
- Kountze, Texas – Herman and Augustus Kountze (financial backers of the Sabine and East Texas Railroad)
- Kranzburg, South Dakota – Nicholas Friedrich Wilhelm, Johann, Mathais, and Paul Ferdinand Kranz (settlers)
- Kyle, Texas – Captain Fergus Kyle (founder)

== L ==
- Laceyville, Ohio – Maj. John S. Lacey
- Laclede, Missouri – Pierre Laclède (founder of St. Louis)
- La Conner, Washington – J.J. Connor (settler) (note the spelling)
- Laddonia, Missouri – Amos Ladd (settler)
- Laddville, California – Alphonso Ladd (founder)
- Lafayette, Colorado – Lafayette Miller (settler and husband of Mary Miller, who platted the town)
- Lairds Landing, California – George and Charles Laird (early settlers)
- Lairdsville, New York – Samuel Laird (settler)
- Lake Ann, Michigan – Ann Wheelock (settler's wife)
- Lake Charles, Louisiana – Charles Sallier
- Lake Helen, Florida – Helen DeLand (founder's daughter)
- Lake Lanier (Georgia) – Sidney Lanier (poet)
- Lake Wilson, Minnesota – Jonathan E. Wilson (landowner)
- Lakin, Kansas – David L. Lakin (resident of Topeka)
- Lamar, Missouri - Mirabeau B. Lamar
- Lamar, 3 places in Colorado and Mississippi – L.Q.C. Lamar
- Lamar River (Wyoming) – L.Q.C. Lamar
- Lamartine, Wisconsin – Alphonse de Lamartine (French historian)
- Lambertville, New Jersey – John Lambert (settler)
- Lamoine, Maine – DeLamoine (early landowner)
- Lamy, New Mexico – Archbishop Jean-Baptiste Lamy
- Lanare, California – L.A. Nares (developer)
- Landaff, New Hampshire – Bishop of Llandaff (Llandaff is the spelling of the name on the town charter)
- Landisburg, Pennsylvania – James Landis (founder)
- Lanesborough, Massachusetts – James Lane, 2nd Viscount Lanesborough
- Lanesboro, Pennsylvania – Martin Lane (settler)
- Langdon, New Hampshire – Governor John Langdon
- Langhorne, Pennsylvania – Jeremiah Langhorne (jurist)
- Lanier, Georgia – Clement Lanier
- Lansingburgh, New York – Abraham Lansing (founder)
- Laramie River (Ohio) – Pierre-Louis de Lorimier (French fur trader)
- Laramie, Wyoming – Jacques La Ramée (French-Canadian fur trader)
- Larned, Kansas – Gen. B.F. Larned
- Larrabee, Iowa – Gov. William Larrabee
- LaSalle, Illinois – René-Robert Cavelier, Sieur de La Salle (explorer)
- Lassen Peak (California) – Peter Lassen (explorer)
- Latrobe, California and Latrobe, Pennsylvania – Benjamin Henry Latrobe, II
- Latty, Ohio – A.S. Latty (settler)
- Lauderdale, Mississippi – Col. James Lauderdale
- Laughlin, California – James H. Laughlin, Jr. (landowner)
- Laughlin, Nevada – Don Laughlin (founder)
- Laurens, South Carolina – Henry Laurens
- Lavers' Crossing, California – David Lavers (founder)
- Lawrence, Kansas – Amos Lawrence
- Lawrence, Massachusetts – Abbott Lawrence (founder)
- Lawrenceburg, Tennessee – Capt. James Lawrence
- Lawrenceville, Georgia – Capt. James Lawrence
- Lawson, Colorado – Alexander Lawson (innkeeper)
- Lawton, Michigan – Nathaniel Lawton (landowner)
- Laytonville, California – F.B. Layton (founder)
- Le Claire, Iowa – Antoine Le Claire (founder of Davenport)
- Le Grand, California – William Legrand Dickinson
- Le Mars, Iowa – Lucy Underhill, Elizabeth Parson, Mary Weare, Anna Blair, Rebecca Smith and Sarah Reynolds (the first initials of six women aboard on a railroad excursion)
- Le Ray, New York – Le Ray Chaumont
- Le Raysville, Pennsylvania – Vincent le Ray (landowner's son)
- Leakesville, Mississippi – Gov. Walter Leake
- Leavenworth, Kansas – Gen. Henry Leavenworth (indirectly, via Fort Leavenworth)
- Leavitt, California – May F. Leavitt (first postmaster)
- Lebam, Washington - Mabel Pearl Goodell (1887-1976), daughter of a early settler
- Lebec, California – Peter Lebeck (killed by a bear nearby in 1837)
- Lecompton, Kansas – Judge D.S. Lecompte
- Ledyard, Connecticut – Col. William Ledyard (state militiaman)
- Ledyard, New York – Benjamin Ledyard (land agent)
- Lee, California – Dick Lee (discoverer of gold at the site)
- Lee, Maine – Stephen Lee (settler)
- Lee, Massachusetts, Lee, New Hampshire, and Lee, New York – General Charles Lee
- Leechburg, Pennsylvania – David Leech
- Lee Vining, California – Leroy Vining (founder)
- Leesville, California – Lee Harl (local landowner)
- Leicester, Massachusetts – Robert Dudley, 1st Earl of Leicester
- Leitchfield, Kentucky – Maj. David Leitch
- Leland, Illinois – Edwin S. Leland
- Lemoore, California – Dr. Lovern Lee Moore (early settler)
- Lempster, New Hampshire – from one of the titles of Sir Thomas Farmer of a "Lempster" in England
- Lennox, South Dakota – Ben Lennox (railroad official)
- Lenoir, North Carolina – Gen. William Lenoir
- Lenora, Kansas – Lenora Hauser
- Lenox, Massachusetts – Charles Lennox, 3rd Duke of Richmond (note the spelling)
- Leon, Iowa – David Camden de Leon
- Leon, Kansas – Juan Ponce de León or after the Iowan town
- Leonard, Michigan – Leonard Rowland
- Leonardville, Kansas – Leonard T. Smith (railroader)
- Leopold, Indiana – Leopold I of Belgium
- Le Roy, New York – Herman Le Roy (landowner)
- Letcher, California – F.F. Letcher (county supervisor)
- Leverett, Massachusetts – John Leverett (twentieth governor of the Massachusetts Bay Colony)
- Levittown, 2 places in New York and Pennsylvania – William Levitt
- Lewis and Clark River (Oregon) – Capt. Meriwether Lewis and William Clark (explorers)
- Lewis, Vermont – Nathan, Sevignior and Timothy Lewis (landholders)
- Lewisboro, New York – John Lewis (resident)
- Lewisburg, West Virginia – Samuel Lewis
- Lewiston, Idaho – Meriwether Lewis
- Lewiston, Minnesota – Johnathan Smith Lewis (settler)
- Lewiston (town), New York – Gov. Morgan Lewis
- Lewistown, Ohio – Capt. John Lewis (Shawnee chief)
- Lewistown, Pennsylvania – William Lewis
- Lila C, California – Lila C. Coleman (mine owner's daughter)
- Lillis, California – Simon C. Lillis (ranch superintendent)
- Ligonier, Pennsylvania – John Ligonier, 1st Earl Ligonier
- Lillington, North Carolina – Col. Alexander Lillington
- Limon, Colorado – John Limon (or Lymon) (railroad construction supervisor)
- Lincklaen, New York – John Lincklaen (landowner)
- Lincoln, Alabama and Lincoln, Vermont – Major General Benjamin Lincoln
- Lincoln, California – Charles Lincoln Wilson (one of the organizers and directors of the California Central Railroad)
- Lincoln, Illinois, Lincoln, Nebraska, and Lincoln, Rhode Island – Abraham Lincoln
- Lincoln, Maine – Enoch Lincoln (Maine's sixth governor)
- Lincoln, New Hampshire – Henry Fiennes Pelham-Clinton, 2nd Duke of Newcastle, 9th Earl of Lincoln
- Lincoln Center, Kansas – Abraham Lincoln (indirectly, via Lincoln County, Kansas)
- Lincoln Village, Ohio - Murray Lincoln
- Lincolnton, Georgia and Lincolnton, North Carolina – Major General Benjamin Lincoln
- Lincolnville, Maine – Major General Benjamin Lincoln (landowner)
- Lincolnville, South Carolina – Abraham Lincoln
- Lindley, New York – Col. Eleazar Lindley
- Linn, Missouri – Lewis F. Linn (U.S. Senator)
- Linneus, Missouri – Lewis F. Linn (U.S. Senator)
- Listerhill, Alabama - J. Lister Hill
- Litchfield, California – Thomas Litch (pioneer)
- Litchfield, New Hampshire – George Henry Lee, Earl of Litchfield
- Littleton, Colorado – Richard S. Little
- Littleton, Massachusetts – George Lyttelton, 1st Baron Lyttelton (note the spelling)
- Littleton, New Hampshire – Col. Moses Little
- Livermore, California – Robert Livermore
- Livermore, Maine – Deacon Elijah Livermore (early settler)
- Livermore Falls, Maine – Deacon Elijah Livermore (early settler)
- Livingston, California – Charles C. Livingston (railroad official)
- Livingston, Montana – Johnston Livingston (Northern Pacific Railway stockholder and director)
- Livingston, New Jersey – William Livingston
- Locke, New York – John Locke
- Lockwood, 3 places in California, New York, and West Virginia – Belva Ann Lockwood
- Logan Creek Dredge (Nebraska) – Logan Fontenelle (Omaha chief)
- Logan, Montana – Captain William Logan (died in the Battle of the Big Hole)
- Logansport, Indiana – Captain Logan (Native American chief)
- Longmont, Colorado – Stephen Harriman Long (explorer) (indirectly, via Longs Peak)
- Longs Peak (Colorado) – Stephen Harriman Long (explorer)
- Longville, California – W.B. Long (early hotel and saw mill owner)
- Loomis, California – Jim Loomis (railroad agent, postmaster)
- Lorenzo, Texas – Lorenzo Dow
- Los Angeles – Our Lady the Queen of the Angels
- Loudon, New Hampshire – John Campbell, 4th Earl of Loudoun (note spelling)
- Louisa, Virginia – Princess Louisa of Great Britain
- Louisiana – Louis XIV (King of France)
- Louisiana, Missouri – Louisiana Basye (daughter of local settlers)
- Louisville, Kansas – Louis Wilson (landowner's son)
- Louisville, Kentucky – Louis XVI (King of France)
- Louisville, Mississippi – Col. Louis Wiston (settler)
- Loveland, Colorado – William A.H. Loveland (president of the Colorado Central Railroad)
- Lovell, Maine – Captain John Lovewell (note spelling)
- Lovelock, California – George Lovelock (early merchant)
- Lowell, Maine – Lowell Hayden (first person born in the town)
- Lowell, Massachusetts, Lowell, Michigan, and Lowell, North Carolina – Francis Cabot Lowell
- Lowville, New York – Nicholas Low
- Lubbock, Texas – Thomas Saltus Lubbock
- Lucas, Iowa – Robert Lucas (territorial governor)
- Lucedale, Mississippi - George Marston Luce (1873–1959), lumber businessman and investor
- Ludington, Michigan – James Ludington (businessman)
- Ludlow, Kentucky – Israel Ludlow (pioneer)
- Lufkin, Texas – Abraham P. Lufkin (cotton merchant and Galveston city councilman)
- Lukeville, Arizona - Charles Luke (1891-1868) and Frank Luke
- Lumpkin, Georgia – Gov. Wilson Lumpkin
- Lundy, California – W.J. Lundy (sawmill owner)
- Lunenburg, Massachusetts – from one of the titles of King George II of Great Britain, Duke of Brunswick-Lüneburg
- Lunenburg, Vermont – from one of the titles for Prince Karl Wilhelm Ferdinand of Brunswick-Lunenburg
- Lusk, Wyoming – Frank S. Lusk (rancher and Wyoming Central Railway stockholder)
- Lutesville, Missouri – Eli Lutes (founder)
- Luther, Michigan – B.T. Luther (sawmill owner)
- Luthersburg, Pennsylvania – W.H. Luther (resident)
- Lutherville, Maryland – Martin Luther (16th century German reformer)
- Lykens, Pennsylvania – Andrew Lycan (note the spelling)
- Lyman, Maine – Theodore Lyman I (merchant)
- Lyman, New Hampshire – General Phineas Lyman (commander in the French and Indian War)
- Lyndeborough, New Hampshire – Benjamin Lynde (Chief Justice of Massachusetts after town was named)
- Lyndon, Vermont – Josias Lyndon (governor of Rhode Island)
- Lyons, Colorado – Edward S. Lyon (founder)
- Lyons, Kansas – Truman J. Lyon (landowner)
- Lyons, Nebraska – Waldo Lyon (resident)
- Lyonsdale, New York – Calen Lyon (settler)
- Lysander, New York – Lysander (Spartan military leader)

== M ==
- Mabbettsville, New York – James Mabbett (landowner)
- Macclenny, Florida – H.C. Macclenny (founder)
- Macksville, Kansas – George Mack (postmaster)
- Macomb, New York – Gen. Alexander Macomb
- Macon, 5 places in Georgia, Illinois, Mississippi, Missouri, and North Carolina – Nathaniel Macon
- Madelia, Minnesota – Madelia Hartshorn (deceased daughter of founder Philander Hartshorn)
- Madison, 5 places in Georgia, Kansas, Maine, New Hampshire and Wisconsin – James Madison
- Madison, South Dakota – James Madison (indirectly, via Madison, Wisconsin)
- Madison County – James Madison, 18 places in
  - Alabama, Arkansas, Florida, Georgia, Illinois, Indiana, Iowa, Kentucky, Mississippi, Missouri, Montana, Nebraska, New York, North Carolina, Ohio, Tennessee, Texas, and Virginia
- Maharishi Vedic City, Iowa - Maharishi Mahesh Yogi
- Mahomet, Illinois – Muhammad (antiquated spelling)
- Mahon, Mississippi – John Mahon
- Mahon, Indiana - Archibald Mahon
- Mamajuda Island, Michigan – Mamajuda (Native American woman)
- Mamakating, New York – Mamakating (Native American chief)
- Mamaroneck, New York – Mamaroneck (Native American chief)
- Mancelona, Michigan – Mancelona Andrews (settler's daughter)
- Manchester, Vermont – Robert Montagu, 3rd Duke of Manchester
- Mandeville, Louisiana – Antoine James de Marigny de Mandeville
- Manlius, New York – Manlius (Roman general)
- Manly, North Carolina – Gov. Charles Manly
- Mannsville, New York – Col. H.B. Mann
- Mansfield, Connecticut – Moses Mansfield (mayor of New Haven)
- Mansfield, Massachusetts – William Murray, 1st Earl of Mansfield
- Mansfield, Ohio – Jared Mansfield (U.S. Surveyor General)
- Mansfield, Pennsylvania – Asa Mann (landowner) (note the spelling)
- Mansfield, Texas – R.S. Man and Julian Feild (settlers) (note spelling)
- Manteo, North Carolina – Manteo (Native American chief)
- Manton, Michigan – George Manton (settler)
- Manuelito, New Mexico – Manuelito (Navajo chief)
- Marcellus, Michigan and Marcellus, New York – Marcus Claudius Marcellus
- Marcus Hook, Pennsylvania – Maarte (Native American chief)
- Marcy, New York – Gov. William L. Marcy
- Margarettsville, North Carolina – Margaret Ridley
- Margaretville, New York – Margaret Lewis (landowner)
- Marias River (Montana) – Maria Wood
- Mariaville, Maine – Maria Matilda (daughter of landholder William Bingham)
- Mariaville Lake, New York – Maria Duane (daughter of James Duane)
- Marietta, Ohio – Marie Antoinette
- Marilla, New York – Marilla Rogers
- Marinette, Wisconsin – Marie Antoinette Chevalier (common-law wife of an early fur trader)
- Marion – Francis Marion (Revolutionary War hero), 14 places in
  - Alabama – Illinois – Indiana – Iowa – Kansas – Kentucky – Louisiana – Massachusetts – Mississippi – New York – North Carolina – Ohio – South Carolina – Virginia
- Marion, North Dakota – Marion Mellen (daughter of Charles Sanger Mellen)
- Marion, Oregon – Francis Marion (Revolutionary War hero) (indirectly, via Marion County, Oregon)
- Marion, South Dakota – Marion Merrill (daughter of S.S. Merrill, railroad official)
- Marion, Texas – Marion Dove (granddaughter of Joshua W. Young, owner of a plantation that the Galveston, Harrisburg and San Antonio Railway passed through)
- Marion County – General Francis Marion of South Carolina, guerilla fighter and hero of the American Revolutionary War, 17 places in
  - Alabama, Arkansas, Florida, Georgia, Illinois, Indiana, Iowa, Kansas, Kentucky, Mississippi, Ohio, Oregon, South Carolina, Tennessee, Texas, and West Virginia
- Marionville, Missouri – Gen. Francis Marion
- Marklee Village, California – Jacob Marklee (early settler)
- Markleeville, California – Jacob Marklee (early settler)
- Marlboro, Vermont – John Churchill, Duke of Marlborough
- Marlborough, Massachusetts and Marlborough, New York – John Churchill, Duke of Marlborough
- Marlborough, New Hampshire – John Churchill, Duke of Marlborough (indirectly, via Marlborough, Massachusetts)
- Marquam, Oregon – Philip Augustus Marquam (resident of Portland)
- Marquette – Jacques Marquette (French missionary and explorer), 8 places in 7 states:
  - Marquette Heights, Illinois - Marquette, Iowa - Marquette, Kansas - Marquette, Michigan - Marquette County, Michigan - Marquette Island, an island in Michigan - Pere Marquette River, a river in Michigan - Lake Marquette, a lake in Minnesota - Marquette, Nebraska - Marquette (town), Wisconsin - Marquette County, Wisconsin
- Marsh Creek Springs, California – John Marsh
- Marshall, Colorado – Joseph M. Marshall (coal miner)
- Marshall, Minnesota – Gov. William Rainey Marshall
- Marshall, Texas – John Marshall
- Marshallton, Delaware – John Marshall (mill owner)
- Marshfield, Vermont – Capt. Isaac Marsh (landowner)
- Martensdale, California – Harry J. Marten (founder)
- Martin County, Florida – John W. Martin 24th Governor of Florida
- Martinez, California – Don Ygnacio Martínez
- Martinsburg, Nebraska – Jonathan Martin (settler)
- Martinsburg, West Virginia – Col. Thomas Bryan Martin (landowner)
- Martins Ferry, California – John F. Martin (first postmaster and ferry operator)
- Martin's Location, New Hampshire – Thomas Martin (grantee)
- Martinsville, Indiana – John Martin (commissioner)
- Maryhill, Washington - Mary Francis "Mamie" Hill (1868–1947) and Mary Mendenhall Hill (1889–1941)
- Maryland – Queen Henrietta Maria of France
- Maryland, New York – Queen Henrietta Maria of France (indirectly, via the state of Maryland)
- Marysville, California – Mary Murphy Covillaud (Donner Party survivor)
- Marysville, Kansas – Mary Marshall (wife of Francis J. Marshall, namesake of Marshall County)
- Maryville, Missouri – Mary Graham (wife of Amos Graham, county clerk)
- Masaryktown, Florida – Tomáš Garrigue Masaryk (Czechoslovak President)
- Mason, Illinois – Roswell B. Mason (railroader)
- Mason, New Hampshire – Captain John Mason (New Hampshire's founder)
- Masonville, New York – Rev. John M. Mason (landholder)
- Massena, New York – André Masséna (French general)
- Massillon, Ohio – Jean Baptiste Massillon (French cleric)
- Matoaca, Virginia – Pocahontas (Matoaca was her name in her native language).
- Mathis, Texas – Thomas Henry Mathis (proprietor)
- Matteson, Illinois – George Joel Aldrich Mattison (note the spelling)
- Mattoon, Illinois – William Mattoon
- Maupin, Oregon – Howard Maupin (settler who established a farm and ferry here)
- Mauriceville, Texas – Maurice Miller (son of the first president of the Orange and Northwestern Railway)
- Mauston, Wisconsin – Milton M. Maughs (founder) (note the spelling)
- Mayer, Arizona – Joe Mayer (founder)
- Mayersville, Mississippi – David Meyers (landowner) (note the spelling)
- Maynard, Massachusetts – Amory Maynard (mill owner)
- Mays Landing, New Jersey – Cornelius Jacobsen May
- Maysville, Kentucky – John May (landowner)
- McAdenville, North Carolina – R.Y. McAden (state legislator)
- McAllen, Texas – John McAllen (settler)
- McArthur, Ohio – Gen. Duncan McArthur
- McClellandville, Delaware – William McClelland (settler)
- McColl, South Carolina – D.D. McColl (businessman)
- McConnelsville, Ohio – Robert McConnel
- McCool, Mississippi – James F. McCool
- McCracken, Kansas – William McCracken (railroader)
- McCune, Kansas – Isaac McCune (founder)
- McDonough, 3 places in Delaware, Georgia, and New York – Thomas Macdonough (naval officer) (note the spelling)
- McFarland, California – J.B. McFarland (founder)
- McGraw, New York – Samuel McGraw
- McGregor, Iowa – Alexander McGregor (landowner)
- McHenry, Illinois – William McHenry
- McKee, Kentucky – George R. McKee (judge)
- McKeesport, Pennsylvania – David McKee (ferry owner)
- McKinleyville, California – President William McKinley
- McKittrick, California – Capt. William McKittrick (local landowner and rancher)
- McMechen, West Virginia - the McMechen family (pioneers)
- McMinnville, Tennessee –Gov. Joseph McMinn
- McNary, Louisiana - James Graham McNary (1877-1962), prominent lumber businessman
- McPherson, Kansas – Major Gen. James B. McPherson
- Mead, Colorado – Dr. Martin Luther Mead (landowner)
- Meade, Kansas – Gen. George Meade
- Meadville, Mississippi – Cowles Mead (territorial official)
- Meadville, Pennsylvania – Gen. David Mead (founder)
- Mebane, North Carolina – Gen. Alexander Mebane
- Medary, South Dakota – Samuel Medary (territorial governor of Kansas)
- Meeker, Colorado – Nathan Meeker (journalist)
- Melba, Idaho - Melba Todd Hays (1909-2001), daughter of a founder
- Mendenhall Springs, California – William M. Mendenhall (health spa proprietor)
- Mendoza, Texas – Antonio de Mendoza (colonial governor)
- Menifee, California – Luther Menifee Wilson (gold miner)
- Mercer, Maine – Brigadier General Hugh Mercer (Revolutionary War hero)
- Mercersburg, Pennsylvania – Brigadier General Hugh Mercer (Revolutionary War hero)
- Mercey Hot Springs, California – J.N. Mercy (early settler)
- Meredith, New Hampshire – Sir William Meredith, 3rd Baronet (member of British Parliament)
- Meredith, New York – Samuel Meredith (merchant)
- Merrill, Wisconsin – S.S. Merrill (railroader)
- Merritt, California – Hiram P. Merritt (early settler)
- Methuen, Massachusetts – Sir Paul Methuen (British diplomat)
- Mettler, California – W.H. Mettler (local agriculturalist)
- Metz, California – W.H.H. Metz (first postmaster)
- Meyers, California – George Henry Dudley Meyers (early landowner)
- Mianus, Connecticut – Mayanno (Native American chief)
- Micanopy, Florida – Micanopy, leading chief of Seminoles, led the tribe during the Second Seminole War
- Middleton, New Hampshire – Sir Charles Middleton, 1st Baron Barham
- Milan, New Hampshire – Milan Harris (mill owner)
- Milan, New Mexico - Salvador Milan (1909-1979), mayor of the village
- Milbank, South Dakota – Jeremiah Milbank (railroad director)
- Milburn, Kentucky – William Milburn
- Milesburg, Pennsylvania – Col. Samuel Miles (founder)
- Miles City, Montana – General Nelson A. Miles
- Miley, California – Julian J. Miley (first postmaster)
- Millard, Omaha, Nebraska – Ezra Millard (founder)
- Millbrae, California – Darius Ogden Mills
- Milledgeville, Georgia – Gov. John Milledge
- Miller, Nebraska – Capt. J.M. Miller (settler)
- Miller Place, New York – Andrew Miller (pioneer)
- Millersburg, Missouri – Thomas Miller (settler)
- Millersburg, Ohio – Charles Miller (founder)
- Millersburg, Pennsylvania – Daniel Miller (founder)
- Millerton, New York – Samuel G. Miller (railroad contractor)
- Milliken, Colorado – John D. Milliken (railroad official)
- Millis, Massachusetts – Lansing Millis (railroad executive)
- Millsfield, New Hampshire – Sir Thomas Mills
- Millspaugh, California – Almon N. Millspaugh (first postmaster)
- Milo, Maine – Milo of Croton (famous athlete from Ancient Greece)
- Milton, California – Milton Latham (railroad engineer)
- Milton, 4 places in Ulster County, New York, North Carolina, Vermont, and West Virginia – John Milton
- Miltonvale, Kansas – Milton Tootle (landowner)
- Minkler, California – Charles O. Minkler (local farmer)
- Minor Creek (California) – Isaac Minor
- Minot, Maine – Judge Minot of the General Court (aided in the town's incorporation)
- Minturn, California – Jonas and Thomas Minturn (local farmers)
- Mitchell, Colorado – George R. Mitchell
- Mitchell, Iowa – John Mitchel (Irish patriot) (note the spelling)
- Mitchell, Oregon – U.S. Senator John H. Mitchell
- Mitchell, South Dakota – Alexander Mitchell (president of the Chicago, Milwaukee, St. Paul and Pacific Railroad)
- Mitchellville, Iowa – Thomas Mitchell
- Moberly, Missouri – Col. William E. Moberly
- Modesto, California – William Chapman Ralston, reputed for being a modest man
- Moffat, Colorado – David Moffat (president of the Denver and Rio Grande Western Railroad)
- Moira, New York – Earl of Moira
- Monroe – James Monroe, 12 places in
  - Connecticut – Georgia – Maine – Massachusetts – Michigan – New Hampshire – New Jersey – New York – North Carolina – Ohio – Utah – Washington
- Monroe City, Indiana – Monroe Alton (founder)
- Monroeville, California – U.P. Monroe (founder)
- Monroeville, New Jersey – Rev. S.T. Monroe
- Monroeville, Pennsylvania – Joel Monroe (first postmaster)
- Monson, Maine – Sir John Monson, 2nd Baron Monson (indirectly, via Monson, Massachusetts)
- Monson, Massachusetts – Sir John Monson, 2nd Baron Monson
- Montague, Massachusetts – Capt. William Montague
- Monterey, California – Gaspar de Zúñiga, 5th Count of Monterrey (colonial governor)
- Monterey, Massachusetts – Gaspar de Zúñiga, 5th Count of Monterrey (indirectly, via Monterrey, Mexico) (The town was named during the Mexican War to commemorate the battle fought there).
- Montezuma, Colorado – Moctezuma I (note the spelling)
- Montgomery, 4 places in Alabama, Massachusetts, Minnesota, and New York – General Richard Montgomery
- Montgomery, Indiana – Valentine B. Montgomery (founder)
- Montgomery, Texas – Andrew J. Montgomery (trading post establisher)
- Montrose, Pennsylvania – Dr. Robert H. Rose
- Mooers, New York – Gen. Benjamin Mooers
- Mooney Flat, California – Thomas Mooney (trading post and hotel establisher)
- Moorcroft, Wyoming – Alexander Moorcroft (settler)
- Moorefield, West Virginia – Conrad Moore
- Moores Flat, California – H.M. Moore (first settler)
- Mooresville, Indiana – Samuel Moore (founder)
- Mooresville, Missouri – W.B. Moore (founder)
- Moorhead, Minnesota – Gen. James K. Moorhead
- Moorhead, Montana – W.G. Moorehead (railroader) (note the spelling)
- Moosup, Connecticut and Moosup River (Connecticut) – Moosup (Native American chief)
- Moraga, California – Joaquin Moraga (explorer and landowner)
- Moran, Kansas – Daniel Moran (businessman)
- Moreau, New York – Jean Victor Marie Moreau (French general)
- Morehead, Kentucky – Gov. James Turner Morehead
- Morehead City, North Carolina – Gov. John Motley Morehead
- Moreno Valley, California – Frank E Brown (Moreno is Spanish for brown); Land developer
- Morgan, Utah – Jedediah Morgan Grant (a leader in the Church of Jesus Christ of Latter-day Saints)
- Morgan, Vermont – John Morgan (landholder)
- Morganfield, Kentucky – Gen. Daniel Morgan
- Morganton, North Carolina – Gen. Daniel Morgan
- Morgan's Point, Texas – Emily West Morgan (known as The Yellow Rose of Texas)
- Morgantown, West Virginia – Zackquill Morgan (landowner)
- Morganville, Kansas – Ebenezer Morgan (founder)
- Morrill, Kansas – Gov. Edmund Needham Morrill
- Morrill, Maine – Anson P. Morrill (governor of Maine)
- Morrilton, Arkansas – E.J. and George H. Morrill (settlers) (note the spelling)
- Morris, Connecticut – James Morris III (Revolutionary War soldier)
- Morris, New York – General Jacob Morris (son of Lewis Morris, a signer of the Declaration of Independence)
- Morrisania, New York, New York – Lewis Morris (statesman)
- Morris Plains, New Jersey – Lewis Morris (the first royal governor of New Jersey)
- Morris Township, New Jersey – Lewis Morris
- Morristown, New Jersey – Lewis Morris
- Morrisville, Bucks County, Pennsylvania – Robert Morris (financier)
- Morrow, Ohio – Gov. Jeremiah Morrow
- Morton Grove, Illinois – Levi P. Morton
- Moses Lake, Washington – Chief Moses (Native American chief of the Sinkiuse-Columbia)
- Moss, Monterey County, California – Charles Moss (wharf owner)
- Moss Landing, California – Charles Moss (wharf owner)
- Moultonborough, New Hampshire – Colonel Jonathan Moulton and others in his family
- Moultrie, Georgia – Gen. William Moultrie
- Moultrieville, South Carolina – Gen. William Moultrie
- Mount Bullion, Mariposa County, California – Senator Thomas Hart Benton (nicknamed "Old Bullion")
- Mount Madison (New Hampshire) – James Madison
- Mount Marcy (New York) – Gov. William L. Marcy
- Mount Mitchell (North Carolina) – Elisha Mitchell (surveyor)
- Mount Monroe (New Hampshire) – James Monroe
- Mount Moran (Wyoming) – Thomas Moran (artist)
- Mount Morris, New York – Thomas Morris (resident of Philadelphia)
- Mount Pulaski, Illinois – Casimir Pulaski (Revolutionary War hero)
- Mount Vernon, Missouri – Admiral Edward Vernon (indirectly, via Mount Vernon)
- Mount Washington, Kentucky and Mount Washington, Massachusetts – George Washington
- Muir, Michigan – W.K. Muir (railroader)
- Muldrow, Oklahoma – Henry L. Muldrow (politician)
- Mullan, Idaho – John Mullan (builder of Mullan Road, a wagon route)
- Mulvane, Kansas – John R. Mulvane (resident of Topeka)
- Mundy Township, Michigan – Lt. Gov. Edward Mundy
- Munfordville, Kentucky – Richard I. Munford (landowner)
- Munnsville, New York – Asa Munn (storekeeper)
- Murdo, South Dakota – Murdo MacKenzie (Texas cattleman)
- Murfreesboro, North Carolina and Murfreesboro, Tennessee – Col. Hardy Murfree
- Muroc, California – Ralph and Clifford Corum (early settlers) – Muroc is Corum spelled backwards
- Murphy, North Carolina – A.D. Murphy (judge)
- Murphys, California – Daniel and John Murphy (early miners and settlers)
- Murray, California – David Murray (olive industry figure)
- Murray, Kentucky – John L. Murray (former Congressman from the area who had died two years before the city's incorporation in 1844)
- Murray, Utah – Eli Murray (territorial governor of Utah)
- Murrieta, California – Juan Murrieta (Rancher)
- Myerstown, Pennsylvania – Isaac Myers (founder)

== N ==
- Naperville, Illinois – Joseph Naper
- Napoleon, Michigan – Napoleon Bonaparte
- Napoleon, Missouri – Napoleon Bonaparte
- Nashmead, California – J. Nash (first postmaster)
- Nashville, North Carolina and Nashville, Tennessee – Gen. Francis Nash
- Nashville, Ohio – Simon Nash (judge)
- Neals Diggins, California – Sam Neal (founder)
- Neligh, Nebraska – John Neligh
- Nelson, California – A.D. Nelson (early settler)
- Nelson, Nebraska – C. Nelson Wheeler (landowner)
- Nelson, New Hampshire – Viscount Horatio Nelson (British admiral and naval hero)
- Nelsonville, New York – Elisha Nelson (settler)
- New Brunswick, New Jersey – George II of Great Britain (also Duke of Brunswick)
- New Florence, Missouri – Florence Lewis (settler's daughter)
- New Franklin, Missouri and New Franklin, Ohio – Benjamin Franklin
- New Marlborough, Massachusetts – John Churchill, Duke of Marlborough (indirectly, via Marlborough, Massachusetts)
- New Orleans, Louisiana – Philippe II, Duke of Orléans
- New Port Richey, Florida – Captain Aaron M. Richey
- New York City and New York (state) – James of York and Albany
- Newberry, Michigan – John A. Newberry (railroader)
- Newcastle, Maine – Thomas Pelham-Holles, 1st Duke of Newcastle-upon-Tyne
- New Coeln, Milwaukee - Christopher Columbus
- Newell, California – Frederick Haynes Newell
- Newellton, Louisiana – Edward D. Newell
- Newfane, Vermont – John Fane, 7th Earl of Westmorland
- Newnan, Georgia – Gen. Daniel Newnan
- Newnansville, Florida – Gen. Daniel Newnan
- Newport, New Hampshire – Henry Newport (English soldier and statesman)
- Newport News, Virginia – Christopher Newport and William Newce (sea captains) (note the spelling for the latter)
- Newton, Georgia and Newton, Texas – John Newton (soldier of the American Revolutionary War)
- Ney, Ohio – Michel Ney (French general)
- Nicholasville, Kentucky – Col. George Nicholas
- Nichols, California – William H. Nichols (landowner)
- Nick's Cove, California – Nick Kojich (restaurateur)
- Nickerson, Kansas – Thomas Nickerson (ATSF president)
- Nicollet, Minnesota – Joseph Nicollet (explorer)
- Nielsburg, California – Arthur C. Neill (first postmaster)
- Niles, Fremont, California – Addison Niles
- Nobleboro, Maine – James Noble (settler)
- Noblesville, Indiana – Gov. Noah Noble
- Norden, California – Charles Van Norden (water company official)
- Norman, Oklahoma – Abner E. Norman (surveyor)
- Normans Kill (New York) – Albert de Norman (settler)
- Norris, Tennessee - George W. Norris
- Norristown, Pennsylvania – Isaac Norris (Mayor of Philadelphia in 1724)
- North, South Carolina – John F. North (founder)
- North Adams, Massachusetts – Samuel Adams (indirectly, via Adams, Massachusetts)
- North Anna River (Virginia) – Anne, Queen of Great Britain
- North Carolina – Charles I of England (King of Great Britain, Carolinus is Latin for Charles)
- North Cleveland, Texas – Charles Lander Cleveland (local judge) (indirectly, via Cleveland, Texas)
- North Dansville, New York – Daniel P. Faulkner (settler)
- North Fort Myers, Florida – Col. Abraham C. Myers
- North Webster, Indiana – Daniel Webster
- Norton, Kansas – Capt. Orloff Norton
- Norton Sound (Alaska) – Fletcher Norton, 1st Baron Grantley
- Nortonville, California – Noah Norton (founder)
- Norvelt, Pennsylvania - Eleanor Roosevelt
- Norwell, Massachusetts – Henry Norwell (1832-1903), dry goods merchant
- Notleys Landing, California – Godfrey Notley (founder)
- Nottingham, New Hampshire – Daniel Finch, 2nd Earl of Nottingham
- Novato, California – a local Miwok leader who had probably been given the name of Saint Novatus at his baptism

== O ==
- O'Fallon, Missouri – Col. John O'Fallon
- O'Neals, California – Charles O'Neal (merchant and first postmaster)
- O'Neill, Nebraska – Gen. John O'Neil (settler)
- Oakley, Kansas – Eliza Oakley Gardner
- Oatman Flat (Arizona) – Royce Oatman (Oatman and his family were killed by a group of Apaches here).
- Oberlin, Ohio – J. F. Oberlin (philanthropist)
- Ockenden, California – Thomas J. Ockenden (first postmaster)
- Odem, Texas – David Odem (San Patricio County sheriff)
- Odenton, Maryland – Oden Bowie (Governor of Maryland)
- Ogden, Kansas – Maj. E.A. Ogden
- Ogden, New York – William Ogden (landowner's son-in-law)
- Ogden, Utah – Peter Skene Ogden
- Ogilby, California – E.R. Ogilby (mine promoter)
- Oglesby, Illinois – Gov. Richard J. Oglesby
- Oglethorpe, Georgia – James Oglethorpe (colonial leader)
- Ogletown, Delaware – Thomas Ogle (landowner)
- Ogontz, 3 places in Michigan, Ohio, and Pennsylvania – Ogontz (Native American chief)
- Oketo, Kansas – Arktatetah (Native American chief)
- Old Ornbaun Hot Springs, California – John S. Ornbaun (early settler and rancher)
- Olean, New York – Olean Shephard (the first white child born here)
- Oleander, California – William Oleander Johnson (first postmaster)
- Oleona, Pennsylvania – Ole Bull (settler)
- Orange, 5 places in Connecticut, Massachusetts, New Jersey, Vermont, and Virginia – William, Prince of Orange
- Orange, Ohio – William, Prince of Orange (indirectly, via Orange, Connecticut)
- Orangeburg, South Carolina – William, Prince of Orange
- Orbisonia, Pennsylvania – William Orbison (settler)
- Ord, Nebraska – Gen. Edward Ord
- Ordbend, California – Edward Ord
- Ordway, Colorado – George N. Ordway (Denver politician)
- Orem, Utah – Walter C. Orem (President of the Salt Lake and Utah Electric Urban Railroad)
- Orford, New Hampshire – Robert Walpole, Earl of Orford
- Orinda, California – Katherine Philips (a poet whose nickname was "Matchless Orinda")
- Orlando, Florida – Orlando Reeves
- Orleans, Massachusetts – Louis Philippe II, Duke of Orléans
- Orono, Maine – Chief Joseph Orono of the Penobscot Nation
- Orrick, Missouri – John C. Orrick (resident of St. Louis)
- Orrs Springs, California – Samuel Orr (early settler)
- Orwigsburg, Pennsylvania – Peter Orwig (founder)
- Osborne, Kansas – Vincent Osborne (member of the Second Kansas Cavalry)
- Osburn, Idaho – Bill Osborne (trading post establisher) (note spelling)
- Osceola, 5 places in Arkansas, Missouri, Nebraska, New York, and Wisconsin – Indian leader Osceola, whose name means "Black Drink Cry"
- Osceola County, 3 places in Florida, Iowa, and Michigan – Indian leader Osceola, whose name means "Black Drink Cry"
- Oskaloosa, Iowa and Oskaloosa, Kansas – Oskaloosa (wife of the Native American chief Mahaska)
- Oshkosh, Wisconsin – Chief Oshkosh
- Otis, Maine – James Otis Jr. (proprietor)
- Otis, Massachusetts – Harrison Gray Otis
- Otisfield, Maine – James Otis, Jr. (grantee)
- Otisville, Michigan – Byron Otis (settler)
- Otisville, New York – Isaac Otis (settler)
- Otto, New York – Jacob S. Otto (land agent)
- Ouray, Colorado – Ouray (Ute chief)
- Ovid, Colorado – Newton Ovid (local resident)
- Ovid, Michigan and Ovid (town), New York – Ovid (poet)
- Owensboro, Kentucky – Abraham Owen
- Owingsville, Kentucky – Col. T.D. Owings
- Oxnard, California – Henry, Ben, James and Robert Oxnard

== P ==
- Pacheco, California – Salvio Pacheco
- Paddock, Holt County, Nebraska – Algernon Paddock (U.S. Senator)
- Paducah, Kentucky and Paducah, Texas – Chief Paduke
- Painesville, Ohio – General Edward Paine (early settler)
- Palmer, Massachusetts – Thomas Palmer (judge)
- Palmer, Michigan – Waterman Palmer (founder)
- Palmer Lake, Colorado – Gen. William Jackson Palmer
- Pamelia, New York – Pamelia Brown (wife of Gen. Jacob Brown)
- Papinville, Missouri – Pierre Papin
- Paragould, Arkansas – W.J. Paramore and Jay Gould (railroaders)
- Pardeeville, Wisconsin – John S. Pardee (founder)
- Paris, New York – Isaac Paris (merchant)
- Parish, New York – David Parish (landowner)
- Parishville, New York – David Parish (landowner)
- Parker, Kansas – J.W. Parker (landowner)
- Parkersburg, West Virginia – Alexander Parker
- Parkman, Maine – Samuel Parkman (proprietor)
- Parkman, Wyoming – Francis Parkman (historian)
- Parkston, South Dakota – R.S. Parke (landowner) (note spelling)
- Parkville, Missouri – George S. Park (founder)
- Parlier, California – I.N. Parlier (first postmaster)
- Parry Peak (Colorado) – Charles Christopher Parry (botanist)
- Parsons, Kansas – Levi Parsons (judge and railroader)
- Parsonsfield, Maine – Thomas Parsons (proprietor)
- Pasco County, Florida – Samuel Pasco, United States Senator from Florida
- Paterson, New Jersey – William Paterson
- Patten, Maine – Amos Patten (settler)
- Patterson, New York – Matthew Paterson (early farmer) (note spelling)
- Patton Township, Pennsylvania – Colonel John Patton (co-owner)
- Paulding, Mississippi and Paulding, Ohio – John Paulding (Revolutionary War soldier)
- Paulsboro, New Jersey – Samuel Phillip Paul (son of a settler)
- Pawling, New York – Catherine Pauling (a misprint caused the U to change to a W and the name stuck)
- Paxton, Massachusetts – Charles Paxton
- Paxton, Nebraska – W.A. Paxton
- Payne, Ohio – Henry B. Payne (U.S. Senator)
- Payson, Arizona – Levi Joseph Payson (Illinois congressman)
- Peabody, Kansas – F.H. Peabody
- Peabody, Massachusetts – George Peabody (philanthropist)
- Pearsonville, California - Andrew "Andy" Pearson (1921-1998) and his wife Lucy Pearson, founders
- Peekskill, New York – Jan Peek (mariner)
- Pelham, Massachusetts – Henry Pelham (Prime Minister of the United Kingdom)
- Pelham, New Hampshire – Thomas Pelham-Holles, 1st Duke of Newcastle (Note: While Gannett names Thomas Pelham-Holles as the town's namesake, the New Hampshire state government identifies Henry Pelham as the town's namesake.)
- Pelham, New York – Pelham Burton (tutor of Thomas Pell)
- Pembroke, Georgia – Pembroke Whitfield Williams (early resident)
- Pembroke, New Hampshire – Henry Herbert, ninth Earl of Pembroke
- Pendleton, Indiana – Thomas M. Pendleton (landowner)
- Pendleton, New York – Sylvester Pendleton Clark
- Pendleton, Oregon – George H. Pendleton (Democratic candidate for Vice President in the 1864 presidential campaign)
- Pendleton, South Carolina – Henry Pendleton (judge)
- Penfield, Georgia – Josiah Penfield
- Penfield, New York – Daniel Penfield (settler)
- Pennsylvania – William Penn (Penn's Woods)
- Pepperell, Massachusetts – Sir William Pepperrell (hero of the Battle of Louisburg)
- Perham, Maine – Gov. Sidney Perham
- Perham, Minnesota – Josiah Perham (officer of the Northern Pacific Railway)
- Perinton, New York – Glover Perrin (settler) (note the spelling)
- Perkins Township, Maine – Thomas Handasyd Perkins
- Perris, California – Frederick Thomas Perris (chief engineer of the California Southern Railroad)
- Perry, Kansas – John D. Perry (railroader)
- Perry, Maine, Perry, New York and Perry, Ohio – Commodore Oliver Hazard Perry (hero of the War of 1812)
- Perry, Florida – Madison Stark Perry, fourth Governor of the State of Florida, Confederate States Army colonel
- Perrysburg (town), New York and Perrysburg, Ohio – Commodore Oliver Hazard Perry
- Perryville, Missouri and Perryville, New Jersey – Commodore Oliver Hazard Perry
- Perth Amboy, New Jersey – James Drummond, 4th Earl of Perth (The article The Amboys contains the etymology)
- Peterboro, New York – Peter Smith
- Peterborough, New Hampshire – Lieutenant Peter Prescott (land speculator)
- Petersburg, Alaska – Peter Buschmann (Norwegian immigrant)
- Petersburg, California – Peter Gardett (early merchant)
- Petersburg, Delaware – Peter Fowler
- Petersburg, Indiana – Peter Brenton (settler)
- Petersburg, Pennsylvania – Peter Fleck (settler)
- Petersburg, Virginia – Peter Jones (co-founder)
- Petersburgh, New York – Peter Simmons (early settler)
- Petersham, Massachusetts – William Stanhope, 1st Earl of Harrington, Viscount Petersham
- Petersville, Indiana – Peter T. Blessing (founder)
- Peytona, West Virginia – William M. Peyton
- Pheba, Mississippi – Pheba Robinson
- Phelps, Missouri – Gov. John S. Phelps
- Phelps, New York – Oliver Phelps (proprietor)
- Pharr, Texas - Henry Newton Pharr (1872-1966)
- Phil Campbell, Alabama – Phil Campbell (Railroad engineer)
- Philippi, West Virginia – Philip P. Barbour (judge)
- Phillips, California – Joseph Wells Davis Phillips (founder)
- Phillips, Maine – Jonathan Phillips (grantee)
- Phillips, Wisconsin – Elijah B. Phillips (railroader)
- Philipsburg, Montana – Philip Deidesheimer (mining engineer)
- Philipsburg, Pennsylvania – James and Henry Philips (settlers)
- Phillipston, Massachusetts – William Phillips, Jr. (lieutenant governor of Massachusetts)
- Philipstown, New York – Adolphus Philipse (patentee)
- Phillipsville, California – George Stump Philipps (early settler)
- Phippsburg, Maine – Sir William Phips (colonial governor of Massachusetts) (note spelling)
- Phoenix, New York – Alexander Phoenix
- Pick City, North Dakota - Lewis A. Pick
- Pickens, Mississippi – James Pickens (landowner)
- Pickens, South Carolina – Gen. Andrew Pickens
- Pickensville, Alabama – Gen. Andrew Pickens
- Pierce, Texas – Thomas W. Pierce (railroader)
- Pierceton, Indiana – Franklin Pierce
- Piercy, California – Sam Piercy (early settler)
- Pierre's Hole (Idaho) – Pierre (Iroquois chief)
- Pierre, South Dakota – Pierre Chouteau, Jr.
- Pierrepont, New York – Hezekiah Pierrepont (proprietor)
- Pierrepont Manor, New York – William C. Pierrepont (resident)
- Pierson, Michigan – O.A. Pierson (settler)
- Pieta, California – Chief Pieta (local chief)
- Piffard, New York – David Piffard (settler)
- Pike, New Hampshire – Alonzo Pike (producer of sharpening stones and tool and cutter grinders)
- Pike, New York – Zebulon Pike (American soldier and explorer)
- Pikes Peak (Colorado) – Zebulon Pike (American soldier and explorer)
- Pikesville, Maryland – Zebulon Pike (American soldier and explorer)
- Pillsbury, Minnesota – Gov. John S. Pillsbury (businessman)
- Pinckney, New York – Charles Cotesworth Pinckney
- Pine Hill, California – Safford E. Pine (local dairy farmer)
- Pinkham's Grant, New Hampshire – Daniel Pinkham (grantee)
- Pishelville, Nebraska – Anton Pishel (postmaster)
- Pitcairn, New York – Joseph Pitcairn (proprietor)
- Pitcher, New York – Lt. Gov. Nathaniel Pitcher
- Pitkin, Colorado – Gov. Frederick Walker Pitkin
- Pittsboro, North Carolina – William Pitt, 1st Earl of Chatham
- Pittsburg, New Hampshire – William Pitt, 1st Earl of Chatham
- Pittsburgh, Pennsylvania – William Pitt, 1st Earl of Chatham
- Pittsfield, Maine – William Pitts (proprietor)
- Pittsfield, 3 places in Massachusetts, New Hampshire, and Vermont – William Pitt, 1st Earl of Chatham
- Pittsfield, Illinois and Pittsfield, New York – William Pitt, 1st Earl of Chatham (indirectly, via Pittsfield, Massachusetts)
- Pittsford, New York – William Pitt, 1st Earl of Chatham (indirectly, named by Colonel Caleb Hopkins after his hometown of Pittsford, Vermont)
- Pittsford, Vermont – William Pitt, 1st Earl of Chatham
- Pittsgrove Township, New Jersey – William Pitt, 1st Earl of Chatham
- Pittston, Maine – John Pitt (judge)
- Pittstown, New Jersey – William Pitt, 1st Earl of Chatham
- Plant City, Florida – Henry B. Plant
- Plattsburgh (city), New York and Plattsburgh (town), New York – Zephaniah Platt (landowner)
- Pleasanton, California and Pleasanton, Kansas – Alfred Pleasonton (Union Army general)
- Pocahontas, Illinois and Pocahontas, Missouri – Pocahontas
- Pocatello, Idaho – Chief Pocatello
- Pokagon Township, Michigan – Chief Pokagon (Pottawattomie leader)
- Poland, Maine – Chief Poland
- Poland, Ohio – George Poland (proprietor)
- Polk County – James K. Polk, 11 places:
  - Arkansas – Florida – Georgia – Iowa – Minnesota – Missouri – Nebraska – Oregon – Tennessee – Texas – Wisconsin
- Polkton, North Carolina – Bishop Leonidas Polk
- Polo, Illinois – Marco Polo
- Pomeroy, Ohio – Samuel Wyllis Pomeroy (proprietor)
- Pomins, California – Frank J. Pomin (first postmaster)
- Pompey, New York – Pompey (Roman general)
- Pontiac, Illinois and Pontiac, Michigan – Chief Pontiac
- Pontotoc, Mississippi – Pontotoc (Chickasaw chief)
- Pooler, Georgia – Robert William Pooler (railroad employee)
- Pope Valley, California – William Pope (land grantee)
- Poplarville, Mississippi – "Poplar" Jim Smith (storekeeper)
- Port Alsworth, Alaska - Leon "Babe" Alsworth (1909-2004), and Mary Alsworth (1923-1996)
- Port Arthur, Texas – Arthur Edward Stilwell (founder)
- Port Clinton, Ohio – DeWitt Clinton (father of the Erie Canal)
- Port Clinton, Pennsylvania – DeWitt Clinton (father of the Erie Canal)
- Port Colden, New Jersey – Cadwallader D. Colden (president of the Morris Canal and Banking Company)
- Port Dickinson, New York – Daniel S. Dickinson (U.S. Senator)
- Port Gibson, Mississippi – David Gibson (landowner)
- Port Kenyon, California – John Gardner Kenyon (founder)
- Port Jervis, New York – John Bloomfield Jervis (engineer with the Delaware and Hudson Canal)
- Port Morris, Bronx, New York – Gouverneur Morris
- Port Murray, New Jersey – James Boyles Murray (third president of the Morris Canal and Banking Company)
- Port Orford, Oregon – George Walpole, 3rd Earl of Orford
- Port Penn, Delaware – William Penn
- Port Richey, Florida – Captain Aaron M. Richey
- Port Townsend, Washington – George Townshend, 1st Marquess Townshend
- Porter, Indiana – Commodore David Porter
- Porter, Maine – Dr. Aaron Porter (proprietor)
- Portola, California – Gaspar de Portolà
- Portola Valley, California – Gaspar de Portolà
- Poseyville, Indiana – Gen. Thomas Posey (governor)
- Post Falls, Idaho – Frederick Post (lumber mill builder)
- Posts, California – William Brainard Post (homesteader)
- Potter, New York – Arnold Potter (proprietor)
- Potter Township, Centre County, Pennsylvania – Gen. James Potter
- Potter Valley, California – William and Thomas Potter (early settlers)
- Pottersville, Michigan – George N. Potter
- Potts Camp, Mississippi – Col. E.F. Potts
- Pottstown, Pennsylvania – John Potts (landowner)
- Pottsville, Pennsylvania – John Potts (landowner) (This is the same John Potts as Pottstown).
- Poultney, Vermont – William Pulteney, 1st Earl of Bath (note spelling)
- Powellton, California – R.P. Powell (early settler)
- Powhattan, Kansas – Chief Powhatan (note the spelling)
- Pownal, Maine and Pownal, Vermont – Thomas Pownall (royal governor of the Massachusetts Bay Colony) (note spelling)
- Poynette, Wisconsin – Peter Paquette (The present name arose from a clerical error).
- Prather, California – Joseph L. Prather (early rancher)
- Pratt, Kansas – Caleb S. Pratt (Civil War soldier)
- Prattsburgh, New York – Capt. Joel Pratt (settler)
- Prattsville (town), New York – Zadock Pratt
- Pray, Montana - Charles Nelson Pray
- Preble, New York – Commodore Edward Preble
- Prentice, Wisconsin – Alexander Prentice (postmaster)
- Prentiss, Maine – Henry Prentiss (landowner)
- Prescott, Arizona – William H. Prescott (historian)
- Prescott, Kansas – C.H. Prescott (railroader)
- Prescott, Massachusetts – Col. William Prescott (Revolutionary War officer)
- Presho, South Dakota – J. S. Presho (early settler)
- Preston, Minnesota – Luther Preston (millwright)
- Preston Township, Pennsylvania – Samuel Preston (judge and settler)
- Prestonsburg, Kentucky – James Patton Preston (governor of Virginia)
- Prestonville, Kentucky – James Patton Preston (governor of Virginia)
- Preston-Potter Hollow, New York – Preston family and Samuel Potter
- Pribilof Islands (Alaska) – Gavriil Pribylov (navigator)
- Prince Frederick, Maryland – Frederick, Prince of Wales
- Prince's Lakes, Indiana – Howard Prince (founder)
- Princeton, Indiana – William Prince
- Princeton, Maine – Rev. Thomas Prince (indirectly, via Princeton, Massachusetts)
- Princeton, Massachusetts – Rev. Thomas Prince
- Princetown, New York – John Prince (politician)
- Proctor, Kentucky – Rev. Joseph Proctor
- Proctor, Minnesota – J. Proctor Knott
- Proctor, Vermont – Senator Redfield Proctor
- Prophetstown, Illinois – Tenskwatawa Native American leader ("the Shawnee Prophet")
- Prosser, Washington – Colonel William Farrand Prosser (homesteader)
- Provo, Utah – Étienne Provost
- Puget Sound (Washington) – Peter Puget (explorer)
- Pulaski, 6 places in Georgia, Illinois, New York, Tennessee, Virginia, and Brown County, Wisconsin – Casimir Pulaski (Revolutionary War hero)
- Pulaski Township, Ohio – Casimir Pulaski (Revolutionary War hero)
- Pullman, 3 places in Michigan, Washington, and West Virginia – George Pullman
- Pullman, Chicago – George Pullman and Solon S. Beman
- Pulteney, New York and Pultneyville, New York (note spelling) – Sir William Pulteney, 5th Baronet, British land speculator
- Pushmataha County, Oklahoma – Chief Pushmataha (Choctaw leader during the War of 1812)
- Putnam, Connecticut – Israel Putnam
- Putnam County, Florida – Benjamin A. Putnam, Florida legislator, first president – Florida Historic Society

== Q ==
- Quanah, Texas – Quanah Parker (the last Comanche chief)
- Queens, New York City – Catherine of Braganza
- Quenemo, Kansas – Quenemo (Native American resident)
- Quincy, Illinois and Quincy, Michigan – John Quincy Adams
- Quincy, Massachusetts – Colonel John Quincy
- Quincy, Washington – John Quincy Adams (indirectly, via Quincy, Illinois)
- Quinlan, Texas – G.A. Quinlan (vice president of the Houston and Texas Central Railway)
- Quintana, Texas – Andrés Quintana Roo
- Quitman, 4 places in Georgia, Mississippi, Missouri, and Texas – Gen. John A. Quitman (also governor of Mississippi)

== R ==
- Rackerby, California – William M. Rackerby (first postmaster)
- Radford, Virginia – William Radford
- Rahway, New Jersey – Rahway (Native American chief)
- Rainier, Oregon – Peter Rainier (British admiral)
- Rainsville, Indiana – Isaac Rains (proprietor)
- Raleigh, 3 places in North Carolina, Mississippi, and Memphis, Tennessee – Sir Walter Raleigh
- Ralston, California – William C. Ralston (mine owner)
- Ralston, Pennsylvania – Matthew C. Ralston
- Ramseur, North Carolina – Gen. Stephen Dodson Ramseur
- Randalls and Wards Islands (New York) – Jonathan Randall (owner)
- Randolph, Maine – Peyton Randolph (indirectly, via Randolph, Massachusetts)
- Randolph, Massachusetts – Peyton Randolph (first president of the Continental Congress)
- Randolph, Nebraska – Jasper Randolph (postman)
- Randolph, New Hampshire – John Randolph (Virginia congressman and senator)
- Randolph, New York – Edmund Randolph (indirectly, via Randolph, Vermont)
- Randolph, Vermont – Edmund Randolph
- Rangeley, Maine – Squire James Rangeley, Jr. (proprietor)
- Rangeley Plantation, Maine – Squire James Rangeley, Jr. (proprietor)
- Ransom Township, Michigan – Gov. Epaphroditus Ransom
- Ransomville, New York – Clark Ransom (settler)
- Rapidan River (Virginia) – Anne, Queen of Great Britain (The name is a conjunction of the phrase "Rapid Anne").
- Rathbone, New York – Gen. Ransom Rathbone (settler)
- Rayl, California – David Rayl (hotelier and merchant)
- Raymond, California – Raymond Whitcomb (travel official)
- Raymond, Maine – Captain William Raymond
- Raymond, New Hampshire – John Raymond (grantee)
- Raymondville, New York – Benjamin Raymond (land agent)
- Raysville, Indiana – Gov. James B. Ray
- Readington Township, New Jersey – John Reading (governor of the Province of New Jersey)
- Readsboro, Vermont – John Reade (landholder) (note spelling)
- Rector, Arkansas – Wharton or Elias W. Rector (politicians)
- Red Cloud, Nebraska – Red Cloud (Lakota chief)
- Redding, Connecticut – John Read (landholder) (the spelling was changed to better reflect its pronunciation)
- Redfield, Arkansas – Jared E. Redfield (railroad executive)
- Redmond, Oregon – Frank and Josephine Redmond (homesteaders)
- Red Shirt, South Dakota – Red Shirt (Lakota chief)
- Red Wing, Minnesota – Red Wing (Native American chief)
- Reedley, California – Thomas Law Reed (founder and landowner)
- Reedsburg, Wisconsin – David C. Reed (settler)
- Reeseville, Wisconsin – Samuel Reese (settler)
- Reidsville, Georgia – Robert R. Reid (territorial governor of Florida)
- Reidsville, North Carolina – Gov. David Settle Reid
- Reiff, California – John Reiff (first postmaster)
- Remsen, New York – Henry Remsen (patentee)
- Reno, Nevada – Jesse L. Reno
- Rensselaer, New York – Kiliaen van Rensselaer
- Reston, Virginia - Robert E. Simon, founder
- Revere, Massachusetts – Paul Revere
- Revillagigedo Islands (Alaska) – Count of Revilla Gigedo (Viceroy of New Spain)
- Reynoldsburg, Ohio – Jeremiah N. Reynolds (author and newspaper editor)
- Rhinebeck (village), New York – William Beekman (founder) (also named for Rhineland, Germany (Beekman's home))
- Rheem, California – Donald I. Rheem (developer)
- Ricardo, California – Richard Hagen
- Richardson Springs, California – J.H. and Lee Richardson (early developers)
- Richburg, New York – Alvan Richardson (settler)
- Richland, Washington – Nelson Rich (state legislator and land developer)
- Richmond, Maine – Ludovic Stewart, 1st Duke of Richmond
- Richmond, Massachusetts and Richmond, New Hampshire – Charles Lennox, 3rd Duke of Richmond
- Richmond, Rhode Island – Edward Richmond (colonial attorney general)
- Richville, New York – Salmon Rich (settler)
- Ridgway, Pennsylvania – John Jacob Ridgway (landowner)
- Ridleys Ferry, California – Thomas E. Ridley (ferry operator)
- Rienzi, Mississippi – Cola di Rienzo
- Rindge, New Hampshire – Captain Daniel Rindge (one of the original grant holders)
- Ringling, Montana - John Ringling, one of the iconic founders of the Ringling Bros. Circus
- Ripley, Maine and Ripley, New York – Brigadier General Eleazer Wheelock Ripley (of the War of 1812)
- Rippey, Iowa – C.M. Rippey (settler)
- Rising City, Nebraska – A.W. and S.W. Rising (landowners)
- Rivanna River (Virginia) – Anne, Queen of Great Britain
- Ritzville, Washington – Philip Ritz (settler)
- Robbinston, Maine – Edward H. and Nathaniel J. Robbins (landowners)
- Robert Lee, Texas – Robert E. Lee (US Civil War General)
- Robidoux Pass (Nebraska) – Antoine Robidoux (trader)
- Robinson, Kansas – Gov. Charles L. Robinson
- Robstown, Texas – Robert Driscoll Jr. (landowner)
- Rochester, New Hampshire and Rochester, Ulster County, New York – Laurence Hyde, 1st Earl of Rochester (brother-in-law to James II of England)
- Rochester, Minnesota – Colonel Nathaniel Rochester (indirectly, via Rochester, New York)
- Rochester, New York – Colonel Nathaniel Rochester
- Rockingham, Vermont – Charles Watson-Wentworth, 2nd Marquess of Rockingham
- Rockwood, California – Charles R. Rockwood (irrigation promoter)
- Rodman, New York – Daniel Rodman
- Rohnerville, California – Henry Rohner (founder)
- Rolfe, Iowa – John Rolfe (settler of Virginia)
- Rollinsford, New Hampshire – descendants of Judge Ichabod Rollins (first probate judge for New Hampshire)
- Rollinsville, Colorado – John Q.A. Rollins
- Romulus, Michigan and Romulus, New York – Romulus
- Roodhouse, Illinois – John Roodhouse (founder)
- Roosevelt, New Jersey – Franklin D. Roosevelt
- Root, New York – Erastus Root (politician)
- Rose, New York – Robert L. Rose (congressman)
- Roseboom, New York – Abraham Roseboom (settler)
- Ross, California – James Ross (early settler)
- Ross Corner, California – W.C. Ross (early settler and merchant)
- Rossie, New York – Rossie Parish (proprietor's sister)
- Rossville, Kansas – W.W. Ross (Indian agent)
- Rossville, Tennessee – John Ross (Cherokee chief)
- Roswell, Colorado – Roswell P. Flower (governor of New York)
- Roswell, Georgia – Roswell King (founder)
- Rothville, Missouri – John Roth (settler)
- Rowe, Massachusetts – John Rowe (Boston merchant)
- Rowesville, South Carolina – Gen. William Rowe
- Rowletts, Kentucky – John P. Rowlett
- Royalston, Massachusetts – Isaac Royal (landowner)
- Ruckersville, Virginia - John Rucker (founder)
- Rulo, Nebraska – Charles Rouleau (note the spelling)
- Rumford, Maine – Benjamin Thompson (also known as Count Rumford)
- Rumney, New Hampshire – Robert Marsham, 2nd Baron Romney (note spelling)
- Rumsey, California – Capt. D.C. Rumsey (early settler)
- Rumsey, Kentucky – Edward Rumsey
- Rushmore, Minnesota – S.M. Rushmore (pioneer)
- Rushville, Indiana and Rushville, Illinois – Dr. Benjamin Rush (Founding Father)
- Rusk, Texas – Thomas Jefferson Rusk (signer of the Texas Declaration of Independence)
- Russell, Kansas – Capt. Avra Russell
- Russell, New York – Russell Atwater (proprietor)
- Russell City, California – Frederick James Russell (town planner)
- Rutherford, New Jersey – John Rutherford (landowner)
- Rutherfordton, North Carolina – Gen. Griffith Rutherford
- Ryan, California – John Ryan (borax company official)

== S ==
- Sabattus, Maine – Sabattus (Anasagunticook Indian chief)
- Sackets Harbor, New York – Augustus Sacketts (settler) (note the spelling)
- Safford, Arizona – Anson P. K. Safford (territorial governor)
- Sageville, Iowa – Hezekiah Sage
- St. Anthony, Minnesota – Anthony of Padua (indirectly, via Saint Anthony Falls)
- Saint Anthony Falls (Minnesota) – Anthony of Padua
- St. Augustine, Florida – Saint Augustine
- St. Augustine, Maryland – Augustine Herman (explorer)
- St. Clair, Michigan – Clare of Assisi (note the spelling)
- St. Clair, Pennsylvania – Gen. Arthur St. Clair
- St. Clairsville, Ohio – Gen. Arthur St. Clair
- St. Clement, Missouri – Clement Grote (settler)
- St. Deroin, Nebraska – Joseph Deroin (Otoe chief)
- Ste. Genevieve, Missouri – Genevieve
- St. George, Maine – Saint George
- St. George, Vermont – George III of Great Britain
- St. George, West Virginia – St. George Tucker (state legislator)
- Saint James, Indiana – Saint James
- St. James, 5 places in Maryland, Minnesota, Missouri, New York, and North Carolina – Saint James
- St. John, Kansas – Gov. John St. John
- St. Johns, Michigan – John Swegles Jr. (founder)
- St. Johnsbury, Vermont – J. Hector St. John de Crèvecœur (diplomat)
- St. Johns River (Florida) – John the Baptist
- St. Joseph, Michigan – Saint Joseph (indirectly, via the St. Joseph River)
- St. Joseph, Missouri – Joseph Robidoux IV (founder)
- St. Joseph River (Lake Michigan) – Saint Joseph
- St. Lawrence River – Saint Lawrence
- St. Louis, Missouri – Saint Louis
- St. Nazianz, Wisconsin – Gregory of Nazianzus
- St. Paul, Minnesota – Saint Paul
- St. Paul, Nebraska – J.N. and N.J. Paul (settlers)
- St. Pete Beach, Florida – Saint Peter (indirectly, via St. Petersburg, Russia)
- St. Petersburg, Florida – Saint Peter (indirectly, via St. Petersburg, Russia)
- St. Marys River (Michigan–Ontario) – Mary, mother of Jesus
- St. Vrain Creek (Colorado) – Ceran St. Vrain (fur trader)
- Salamanca (city), New York and Salamanca (town), New York – Don José de Salamanca y Mayol, Marquis of Salamanca
- Salisbury, Missouri – Lucius Salisbury (resident)
- Sallis, Mississippi – Dr. James Sallis (landowner)
- Salyersville, Kentucky – Samuel Salyer (state legislator)
- Samsonville, New York – Gen. Henry A. Sampson (note the spelling)
- Sam Rayburn, Texas - Sam Rayburn
- San Andreas, California – Saint Andrew
- San Angelo, Texas – Carolina Angela DeWitt (wife of the city's founder Bartholomew J. DeWitt)
- San Antonio, Florida and San Antonio, Texas – Saint Anthony of Padua
- San Bernardino, California – Saint Bernardine of Siena
- San Bruno, California – Saint Bruno of Cologne (indirectly, via the San Bruno Creek)
- San Diego, California – Saint Didacus
- San Francisco, California – Saint Francis
- San Jose, California – Saint Joseph
- San Juan Capistrano, California – Saint John Capistrano
- San Leandro, California – Saint Leander of Seville
- San Lorenzo, California – Saint Lawrence
- San Lucas, California – Luke the Evangelist (indirectly, from the Spanish land grant)
- San Luis Obispo, California – Saint Louis of Toulouse
- San Luis Rey, California – Saint Louis
- San Mateo, California – Saint Matthew
- San Miguel, San Luis Obispo County, California – Saint Michael
- San Pablo, California – Saint Paul
- Sanborn, Iowa – George W. Sanborn (railroader)
- Sanbornton, New Hampshire – John Sanborn (grantee)
- Sanders, California – Charlotte E. Sanders (first postmaster)
- Sandisfield, Massachusetts – Samuel Sandys, 1st Baron Sandys (note the spelling)
- Sanford, Florida – Henry Shelton Sanford (diplomat and founder)
- Sanford, Maine – Peleg Sanford (proprietor)
- Sanger, California – Joseph Sanger Jr. (Railroad Yardmaster Association secretary-treasurer)
- Sangerfield, New York – Jedediah Sanger (judge)
- Sangerville, Maine – Colonel Calvin Sanger (landowner)
- Santa Ana, California and Santa Ana Pueblo, New Mexico – Saint Anne
- Santa Barbara, California – Saint Barbara
- Santa Clara, California – Saint Clare of Assisi
- Santa Monica, California – Saint Monica
- Santa Ynez, California – Saint Agnes
- Sapinero, Colorado – Sapinero (Native American chief)
- Saranap, California – Sara Napthaly (mother of a railroad man)
- Sarcoxie, Missouri – Sarcoxie (Native American chief)
- Sauget, Illinois - Leo Sauget (1888-1972), founding mayor of the Village
- Sault Ste. Marie, Michigan – Mary, mother of Jesus (indirectly, after the St. Marys River)
- Sauvie Island (Oregon) – Jean Baptiste Sauve (dairy owner)
- Sayre, Pennsylvania – R.S. Sayre (railroader)
- Schererville, Indiana – Nicholas Scherer (German settler)
- Schoolcraft, Michigan – Henry Schoolcraft (anthropologist)
- Schroeppel, New York – Henry W. Schroeppel (resident)
- Schuyler, Nebraska – Vice President Schuyler Colfax
- Schuylerville, New York – Gen. Philip Schuyler
- Schwaub, California – Charles M. Schwab (note the spelling)
- Scipio, New York – Scipio Africanus (Roman general)
- Scott, New York – General Winfield Scott
- Scottdale, Georgia – George Washington Scott
- Scottdale, Pennsylvania – Thomas A. Scott (railroader)
- Scotts, California – Charles A. Scott (first postmaster)
- Scottsboro, Georgia – Gen. John Scott
- Scottsburg, New York – Matthew and William Scott (settlers)
- Scotts Corner, California – Thomas Scott, Sr. (local merchant)
- Scottsdale, Arizona – Chaplain Winfield Scott
- Scottsville, Kentucky – Gen. Charles Scott (also served as governor of Kentucky)
- Scottsville, New York – Isaac Scott (settler)
- Scranton, Pennsylvania – Selden T. and George W. Scranton (founders of the Lackawanna Steel Company and, later, the city)
- Scriba, New York – George Scriba (proprietor)
- Searsmont, Maine – David Sears (proprietor)
- Searsport, Maine – David Sears (proprietor)
- Seattle, Washington – Chief Seattle
- Sedgwick, Arkansas – Union Major General John Sedgwick
- Sedgwick, Colorado – Union Major General John Sedgwick (indirectly, via Fort Sedgwick)
- Sedgwick, Kansas – Union Major General John Sedgwick (indirectly, via Sedgwick County)
- Sedgwick, Maine – Major Robert Sedgwick
- Sedona, Arizona – Sedona Miller Schnebly (wife of the city's first postmaster)
- Seeley, California – Henry Seeley (developer of Imperial County)
- Seguin, Texas – Juan Seguin (Texas political figure and Texas Revolution patriot)
- Seigler Springs, California – Thomas Seigler (discoverer of the springs)
- Selby, California – Prentiss Selby (first postmaster)
- Selma, California – Selma Michelsen (wife of railroad employee)
- Sempronius, New York – Tiberius and Gaius Sempronius Gracchus (Roman tribunes and agrarian reformers)
- Senath, Missouri – Senath Douglass (settler's wife)
- Sergeant Bluff, Iowa – Sergeant Charles Floyd
- Seward, Alaska, Seward, Nebraska, and Seward, New York – William H. Seward
- Seymour, Connecticut – Governor Thomas H. Seymour
- Shafter, California – Gen. William Rufus Shafter
- Shaftsbury, Vermont – Earl of Shaftesbury (note spelling)
- Shakopee, Minnesota – Shakopee (Native American chief)
- Shapleigh, Maine – Major Nicholas Shapleigh (proprietor)
- Sharon, California – William Sharon (financier)
- Sharpsburg, Kentucky – Moses Sharp
- Sharpsburg, Pennsylvania – James Sharp (proprietor)
- Shaver Lake, California – C.B. Shaver (irrigation company founder)
- Sheffield, Iowa – James Sheffield (railroad contractor)
- Shelburne, 3 places in Massachusetts, New Hampshire, and Vermont – William Petty, 2nd Earl of Shelburne
- Shelby, New York – Gen. Isaac Shelby
- Shelbyville, 3 places in Illinois, Indiana, and Missouri – Gen. Isaac Shelby
- Shepherd, Michigan – I.N. Shepherd (founder)
- Shepherdstown, West Virginia – Capt. Thomas Shepherd
- Sheridan, Montana and Sheridan, Wyoming – General Philip Sheridan (Union cavalry leader in the American Civil War)
- Sherman, Michigan – Gen. William T. Sherman
- Sherman, New York – Roger Sherman (Founding Father)
- Sherman, Texas – Sidney Sherman (Texian patriot)
- Shirley, Maine – William Shirley (indirectly, via Shirley, Massachusetts)
- Shirley, Massachusetts – William Shirley (governor of Massachusetts)
- Shirleysburg, Pennsylvania – William Shirley (governor of Massachusetts)
- Shoup, Idaho – George L. Shoup (U.S. Senator)
- Shreveport, Louisiana – Captain Henry Shreve, who opened the Red River, which runs through Shreveport, to marine navigation
- Shrewsbury, Massachusetts – George Talbot, 6th Earl of Shrewsbury
- Shrewsbury, Vermont – Earl of Shrewsbury
- Shullsburg, Wisconsin – Jesse W. Shull (settler)
- Shutesbury, Massachusetts – Samuel Shute (governor of Massachusetts)
- Sicard Flat, California – Theodore Sicard (early settler)
- Sidney, Iowa – Sir Philip Sidney (English author) (indirectly, after Sidney, Ohio)
- Sidney, Maine and Sidney, Ohio – Sir Philip Sidney (English author)
- Sidney, Montana – Sidney Walters (son of settlers)
- Sidney, Nebraska – Sidney Dillon (railroad attorney)
- Sidney, New York – Admiral Sir Sidney Smith
- Sigel, Illinois – Gen. Franz Sigel
- Sigourney, Iowa – Lydia Sigourney (poet)
- Sikeston, Missouri – John Sikes (founder)
- Silsbee, California – Thomas Silsbee (local rancher)
- Silsbee, Texas – Nathaniel D. Silsbee (railroad investor)
- Simpsonville, Kentucky – John Simpson (U.S. representative)
- Sinclairville, New York – Samuel Sinclair (settler)
- Sinton, Texas – David Sinton
- Skilesville, Kentucky – James R. Skiles
- Slates Hot Springs, California – Thomas B. Slate (owner, founder)
- Slatersville, Rhode Island – Samuel Slater (founder)
- Slaughters, Kentucky – G.G. Slaughter (settler)
- Slayton, Minnesota – Charles Slayton (founder)
- Sleepy Eye, Minnesota – Ishtakhaba (pronounced: Ish-Ta-Ka-Ba) (Native American chief whose eyes were said "to have the appearance of sleep.")
- Sloan, Iowa – Samuel Sloan (railroad official)
- Sloansville, New York – John R. Sloan (settler)
- Sloat, California – John D. Sloat (Naval commodore who claimed California for the United States)
- Sly Park, California – James Sly (pioneer)
- Smartsville, California – Jim Smart (Gold Rush settler and merchant)
- Smethport, Pennsylvania – Theodore Smeth (friend of proprietor)
- Smith's Ferry, California – James Smith (founder)
- Smith Center, Kansas – J. Nelson Smith (soldier) (indirectly, via Smith County)
- Smithfield, Maine – Rev. Henry Smith (settler)
- Smithfield, New York – Peter Smith
- Smithfield, North Carolina – John Smith (state legislator)
- Smithflat, California – Jeb Smith (pioneer rancher)
- Smith River (Montana) – Robert Smith (Secretary of State)
- Smithtown, New York – Richard Smith (proprietor)
- Smithville, Missouri – Humphrey Smith (settler)
- Smithville, New York – Jesse Smith (lumber dealer)
- Snydertown, Northumberland County, Pennsylvania – Gov. Simon Snyder
- Soddy-Daisy, Tennessee – William Sodder (trading post proprietor) and Daisy Parks (daughter of a coal company manager)
- Solon, Maine and Solon, New York – Solon (statesman and poet of Ancient Greece)
- Somers, Connecticut – Lord John Somers of England
- Somers, New York – Capt. Richard Somers
- Somersville, California – Francis Somers (coal mine founder)
- Somerville, Massachusetts – Capt. Richard Somers
- Soperton, Georgia – Benjamin Franklin Soper (railroad engineer)
- South Amboy, New Jersey – James Drummond, 4th Earl of Perth (The article The Amboys contains the etymology)
- South Anna River (Virginia) – Anne, Queen of Great Britain
- South Burlington, Vermont – Richard Boyle, 3rd Earl of Burlington (indirectly, via Burlington, Vermont)
- South Carolina – Charles I of England (King of Great Britain, Carolinus is Latin for Charles)
- South Euclid, Ohio – Euclid (Greek mathematician)
- South Padre Island, Texas – José Nicolás Ballí (Padre Ballí) (Catholic priest and settler)
- South Thomaston, Maine – General John Thomas (indirectly, via Thomaston, Maine)
- Spafford, New York – Horatio Spafford
- Spalding, Missouri – Robert Marion Spalding owner of Spalding Springs
- Spalding Tract, California – John S. Spalding (founder)
- Sparks, Nevada – John Sparks
- Spearville, Kansas – Alden Speare (resident of Boston)
- Spencer, Indiana – Capt. Spier Spencer
- Spencer, Massachusetts – Spencer Phips (acting governor of Massachusetts)
- Spencerport, New York – William H. Spencer (settler)
- Spivey, Kansas – R.M. Spivey (landowner)
- Sprague, Washington – General John W. Sprague (railroad executive)
- Spreckels, California – Claus Spreckels (sugar magnate)
- Stacy, California – Stacy Spoon
- Stafford, Humboldt County, California – Judge Cyrus G. Stafford
- Stafford, Kansas – Lewis Stafford (soldier)
- Standish, California and Standish, Maine – Myles Standish
- Stanfield, Oregon – Senator Robert N. Stanfield
- Stanley, North Carolina – Elwood Stanley (U.S. representative)
- Stannard, Vermont – George J. Stannard
- Stanton, Michigan – Edwin Stanton (Secretary of War)
- Stark, Kansas – General John Stark (indirectly, via Stark County, Illinois)
- Stark, New Hampshire and Stark, New York – General John Stark (author of New Hampshire's motto, "Live Free or Die")
- Starkey, New York – John Starkey (settler)
- Starks, Maine – General John Stark
- Starksboro, Vermont – General John Stark
- Starkville, Colorado – Albert G. Stark (coal mine owner)
- Starkville, Mississippi – General John Stark
- Stege, California – Richard Stege (founder and landowner)
- Stephenson, Michigan – Robert Stephenson
- Stephentown, New York – Stephen Van Rensselaer (Lieutenant Governor of New York)
- Sterling, Kansas – Sterling Rosan (settlers' father)
- Sterling, Massachusetts – General William "Lord Stirling" Alexander (Scottish expatriate) (note spelling)
- Stetson, Maine – Amasa Stetson (landowner)
- Steuben, Maine and Steuben, New York – Friedrich Wilhelm von Steuben
- Steubenville, Ohio – Friedrich Wilhelm von Steuben
- Stevens Point, Wisconsin – J.D. Stevens (missionary)
- Stevensville, Michigan – Thomas L. Stevens (founder)
- Stevensville, Montana – Isaac Stevens (1st governor of Washington Territory)
- Stevinson, California – James J. Stevinson (landowner)
- Stewartstown, New Hampshire – Sir John Stuart (the town was incorporated following the Scottish spelling of the name)
- Stewartsville, Missouri – Gov. Robert Marcellus Stewart
- Stewartville, California – William Stewart (local coal mine owner)
- Stickney, South Dakota – J.B. Stickney (railroad official)
- Stilesville, Indiana – Jeremiah Stiles (proprietor)
- Stinson Beach, California – Nathan H. Stinson (landowner)
- Stockton, 3 places in California, Missouri, and New York – Robert F. Stockton
- Stoddard, New Hampshire – Colonel Sampson Stoddard (grantee of territory)
- Stokes Landing, California – James Johnstone Stokes (founder)
- Stonewall, North Carolina – Stonewall Jackson (Confederate general)
- Stoughton, Massachusetts – William Stoughton (first chief justice of Colonial Courts)
- Stoughton, Wisconsin – Luke Stoughton (Englishman from Vermont)
- Stoutsville, Missouri – Robert P. Stout
- Stoystown, Pennsylvania – John Stoy (settler)
- Strafford, New Hampshire and Strafford, Vermont – Thomas Wentworth, Earl of Strafford
- Stratham, New Hampshire – Wriothesley Russell, 2nd Duke of Bedford, Baron Howland of Streatham (note spelling)
- Stratton, Vermont – Samuel Stratton (settler)
- Strong, Maine – Caleb Strong (governor of Massachusetts)
- Strong City, Kansas – William Barstow Strong (ATSF president)
- Strother, Missouri – French Strother (professor)
- Stroudsburg, Pennsylvania – Col. Jacob Stroud (settler)
- Struthers, Ohio – Captain John Struthers (founder)
- Stuart, Nebraska – Peter Stuart (settler)
- Sturgeon, Missouri – Isaac Sturgeon (resident of St. Louis)
- Sturgis, Michigan – Judge John Sturgis (settler)
- Stuyvesant, New York – Peter Stuyvesant (colonial governor)
- Suffern, New York – John Suffern (first Rockland County judge)
- Sullivan, Indiana – Daniel Sullivan (soldier)
- Sullivan, Maine – Daniel Sullivan (settler)
- Sullivan, Missouri – General John Sullivan (indirectly, via Sullivan County, Tennessee)
- Sullivan, New Hampshire and Sullivan, New York – General John Sullivan
- Sumner, Maine – Increase Sumner (governor of Massachusetts)
- Sumter, South Carolina – Gen. Thomas Sumter
- Sunderland, Massachusetts – Charles Spencer, 3rd Earl of Sunderland
- Sunol, California – Antonio Suñol (Californio ranchero)
- Surry, New Hampshire – Charles Howard, Earl of Surrey
- Sutro, Nevada – Adolph Sutro
- Susanville, California – Susan Roop (daughter of Isaac Roop)
- Sutter, California – John A. Sutter (pioneer of the California Gold Rush)
- Sutter Creek, California – John A. Sutter
- Sutter Hill, California – John A. Sutter
- Swainsboro, Georgia – Stephen Swain (state senator)
- Swan's Island, Maine – Colonel James Swan of Fife, Scotland (land purchaser)
- Sweetland, California – Sweetland brothers (early settlers)
- Swepsonville, North Carolina – George William Swepson (capitalist)
- Symmes Township, Hamilton County, Ohio – John Cleves Symmes (judge)

== T ==
- Taft, California – William Howard Taft
- Talbott, Tennessee – Col. John Talbott
- Talbotton, Georgia – Gov. Matthew Talbot
- Talmadge, Maine – Benjamin Talmadge (landowner)
- Talmage, California – Junius Talmage (early settler)
- Tamworth, New Hampshire – British Admiral Washington Shirley, Viscount Tamworth
- Tancred, California – Tancred, Prince of Galilee
- Taopi, Minnesota – Taopi (Native American chief)
- Tarkington Prairie, Texas – Burton Tarkington (early settler)
- Tarpey, California – Arthur B. Tarpey
- Tatamy, Pennsylvania – Tatamy (Native American chief)
- Taylor, New York – Zachary Taylor
- Taylor County, 4 places in Florida, Georgia, Iowa, and Kentucky – Zachary Taylor, twelfth President of the United States of America
- Taylor Ridge (Georgia) – Richard Taylor (Cherokee chief)
- Taylorsville, Indiana – Zachary Taylor
- Taylorsville, Kentucky – Richard Taylor (proprietor)
- Taylorsville, North Carolina – John Louis Taylor (judge)
- Taylorville, California – Samuel P. Taylor (paper mill owner)
- Tazewell, Georgia and Tazewell, Virginia – Henry Tazewell (U.S. Senator from Virginia)
- Tecopa, California – Chief Tecopa (Paiute chief)
- Tecumseh, 3 places in Michigan, Nebraska, and Oklahoma – Tecumseh (Native American leader)
- Tekonsha, Michigan – Tekonsha (Native American chief)
- Temple, New Hampshire – John Temple (lieutenant governor to colonial governor John Wentworth)
- Temple, Texas – Bernard Moore Temple (civil engineer)
- Templeton, Massachusetts – Richard Grenville-Temple, 2nd Earl Temple
- Terry, Mississippi – Bill Terry (resident)
- Terry, Montana – General Alfred Howe Terry
- Terrytown, Nebraska - Terry Carpenter
- Thacher Island (Massachusetts) – Anthony Thacher (sailor shipwrecked there)
- Thayer, Kansas – Nathaniel Thayer
- Thetford, Vermont – Augustus Henry Fitzroy, 3rd Duke of Grafton, 4th Earl of Arlington and 4th Viscount Thetford
- Thibodaux, Louisiana – Gov. Henry S. Thibodaux
- Thomaston, Connecticut – Seth Thomas (clockmaker)
- Thomaston, Georgia – Gen. Jett Thomas
- Thomaston, Maine – General John Thomas of the Continental Army
- Thomasville, Georgia – Gen. Jett Thomas
- Thompson, Connecticut – Sir Robert Thompson (English landholder)
- Thorndike, Maine – Israel Thorndike (landowner)
- Thornton, Colorado – Governor Dan Thornton
- Thornton, Mississippi – Dr. C.C. Thornton (landowner)
- Thornton, New Hampshire – Dr. Matthew Thornton (grantee and signer of the Declaration of Independence)
- Throggs Neck, Bronx, New York – John Throckmorton (patentee)
- Throop, New York – Gov. Enos T. Throop
- Thurman, New York – John Thurman
- Thurston, New York – William R. Thurston (landowner)
- Tiffin, Ohio – Gov. Edward Tiffin
- Tilton, New Hampshire – Nathaniel Tilton (iron foundry owner and hotelier) and Charles E. Tilton (1827–1901)
- Tinley Park, Illinois – Samuel Tinley, Sr. (railroad station agent)
- Tipton, Indiana – John Tipton (U.S. Senator)
- Titusville, Pennsylvania – Jonathan Titus (landowner)
- Todd Valley, California – Dr. F. Walton Todd (store owner)
- Tomah, Wisconsin – Tomah (Menominee chief)
- Tomball, Texas - Thomas H. Ball
- Tome, New Mexico – Saint Thomas
- Tompkins, New York – Daniel D. Tompkins (Vice President and governor of New York)
- Tompkinsville, Kentucky and Tompkinsville, Staten Island, New York – Daniel D. Tompkins (Vice President and governor of New York)
- Toms Place, California – Tom Yernby (resort owner)
- Toms River, New Jersey – Capt. William Tom (settler)
- Tormey, California – Patrick Tormey (landowner)
- Torrance, California – Jared Sidney Torrance
- Torrey, New York – Henry Torrey
- Tower City, North Dakota and Tower City, Pennsylvania – Charlemagne Tower
- Towle, California – George and Allen Towle (local lumbermen)
- Townsend, Delaware – Samuel Townsend (landowner)
- Townsend, Massachusetts – Charles Townshend (British cabinet minister) (note spelling)
- Townshend, Vermont – the Townshend family (powerful figures in British politics)
- Towson, Maryland – Ezekial Towson (hotelier)
- Trenton, New Jersey – William Trent (landholder)
- Trexlertown, Pennsylvania – John Trexler
- Troy, North Carolina – Matthew Troy (lawyer)
- Truesdale, Missouri – William Truesdale (landowner)
- Trumbull, Connecticut – Jonathan Trumbull (governor of Connecticut)
- Truxton, New York – Commodore Thomas Truxton (naval officer of the American Revolution)
- Tryon, North Carolina – William Tryon (colonial governor)
- Tuftonboro, New Hampshire – John Tufton Mason (owner of the town)
- Tully, New York – Marcus Tullius Cicero
- Tunbridge, Vermont – William Henry Nassau de Zuylestein, 4th Earl of Rochford, Viscount Tunbridge, Baron Enfield and Colchester
- Tupman, California – H.V. Tupman (landowner)
- Turner, Maine – Reverend Charles Turner (agent, later became minister of the town)
- Turners Falls, Massachusetts – Captain William Turner
- Tuscola, Illinois – Tusco (Native American chief)
- Tustin, California – Columbus Tustin
- Tusten, New York – Col. Benjamin Tusten
- Tuttle, California – R.H. Tuttle (railroad executive)
- Twain Harte, California – Mark Twain and Bret Harte
- Two Strike, South Dakota – Two Strike (Lakota chief)
- Tygart Valley River (West Virginia) – David Tygart (settler)
- Tyler, Texas – John Tyler
- Tyngsborough, Massachusetts – Colonel Jonathan Tyng (landowner)
- Tyringham, Massachusetts – Jane Tyringham (married name Beresford) cousin of Sir Francis Bernard; the only town in Massachusetts named after a woman; Sir Francis Bernard inherited Nether Winchendon House, Bucks., England from her

== U ==
- Udall, Kansas – Cornelius Udall
- Ulysses, Kansas and Ulysses, Nebraska – Ulysses S. Grant
- Uncasville, Connecticut – Uncas (Native American chief)
- Underhill, Wisconsin – William Underhill (settler from Vermont)
- Urban, California – Eva L. Urban (first postmaster)
- Uvalde, Texas – Juan de Ugalde (Spanish governor of Coahuila) (indirectly, via Uvalde County, Texas)
- Uxbridge, Massachusetts – Henry Paget, 1st Earl of Uxbridge

== V ==
- Vacaville, California – Juan Manuel Vaca (founder)
- Vade, California – Sierra Nevada "Vade" Phillips (founder's daughter)
- Valdez, Alaska – Antonio Valdés y Basán (Spanish naval officer)
- Valdosta, Georgia – Augustus (indirectly, via Aosta, Italy)
- Vallejo, California – Mariano Guadalupe Vallejo
- Van Buren, New York – Martin van Buren
- Van Lear, Kentucky – Van Lear Black (businessman)
- Van Nuys, California – Isaac Newton Van Nuys (landowner)
- Vanceboro, Maine – William Vance (landowner)
- Vanceboro, North Carolina – Zebulon Baird Vance (governor and U.S. Senator)
- Vancouver, Washington – George Vancouver (explorer)
- Van Etten, New York – James B. Van Etten (state legislator)
- Vardaman, Mississippi - James K. Vardaman, Governor of Mississippi
- Vassalboro, Maine – Florentins Vassall (patentee)
- Vaugine Township, Arkansas – Francis Vaugine (landowner)
- Veazie, Maine – General Samuel Veazie (businessman)
- Vergennes, Vermont – Charles Gravier, Comte de Vergennes
- Verplanck, New York – Philip Verplanck
- Vicksburg, Mississippi – Neivitt Vick (founder)
- Victoria, Texas – General Guadalupe Victoria (first president of Mexico)
- Victorville, California – Jacob Nash Victor
- Vidalia, Louisiana – Don José Vidal (colonial governor)
- Vidor, Texas – Charles Shelton Vidor (owner of the Miller-Vidor Lumber Company)
- Villemont Township, Arkansas – Carlos de Villemont (landowner)
- Vinalhaven, Maine – John Vinal (Boston merchant who helped settlers obtain title to the land)
- Vincent House (Fort Dodge, Iowa) - Web Vincent (businessman)
- Vining, Kansas – E.P. Vining (railroader)
- Vinton, California – Vinton Bowen (daughter of a railroad official)
- Viola, Wisconsin – Viola Buck
- Virgil, New York – Virgil (Roman poet)
- Virgilia, California – Virgilia Bogue (daughter of railroad executive Virgil Bogue)
- Virginia – Elizabeth I of England, the "Virgin Queen"
- Virginia City, Nevada – Elizabeth I of England, the "Virgin Queen" (indirectly, via Virginia)
- Volney, New York – Constantin François de Chassebœuf, comte de Volney (philosopher)
- Votaw, Texas – Clark M. Votaw (vice president of the Santa Fe Townsite Company, which laid out the town lots)
- Voorheesville, New York – Theodore Voorhees (railroader)

== W ==
- Wabasha, Minnesota – Wabasha (Native American chief)
- Wabaunsee, Kansas – Waubonsie (Native American chief) (note the spelling)
- Wabd, Kentucky – William A. B. Davis (post office founder)
- Wacouta, Minnesota – Wacouta (Native American chief)
- Waddell, Arizona - Donald Ware Waddell (1881-1963), investment banker
- Waddington, California – Alexander Waddington (local merchant)
- Waddington, New York – Joshua Waddington (proprietor)
- Wadesboro, North Carolina – Col. Thomas Wade
- Wadsworth, Ohio – General Elijah Wadsworth
- Wagener, South Carolina - George Wagener (Charleston merchant and railroad company president) (Note: Gannett (1902, p. 262) identifies F.W. Wagener, a relative of George Wagener, as the town's namesake.)
- Waite, Maine – Benjamin Waite (lumberman)
- Waitsfield, Vermont – General Benjamin Wait (founder)
- WaKeeney, Kansas – A.E. Warren and J.F. Keeney (founders)
- Wakefield, Kansas – Rev. Richard Wake (founder)
- Wakefield, Massachusetts – Cyrus Wakefield (wicker furniture manufacturer)
- Wakefield, North Carolina – Margaret Wake Tryon (colonial governor's wife) (indirectly, via Wake County)
- Wake Forest, North Carolina – Margaret Wake Tryon (colonial governor's wife) (indirectly, via Wake County)
- Walden, New York – Jacob T. Walden
- Waldo, Maine – General Samuel Waldo (proprietor)
- Waldo, Wisconsin – O.H. Waldo (railroad company president)
- Waldo Junction, California – William Waldo (early settler)
- Waldoboro, Maine – General Samuel Waldo
- Waldron Island (Washington) – W.T. Waldron (sailor)
- Wales, Massachusetts – James Lawrence Wales (benefactor)
- Walesboro, Indiana – John P. Wales (founder)
- Walker Pass (California) – Joseph R. Walker (explorer)
- Walker River (Nevada) – Joseph R. Walker (explorer)
- Wallace, California – John Wallace (surveyor)
- Wallace, Idaho – Colonel W.R. Wallace (landowner)
- Wallington, New Jersey – Walling van Winkle (landowner)
- Walpole, Massachusetts and Walpole, New Hampshire – Robert Walpole, Earl of Orford
- Walsenburg, Colorado – Fred Walsen (store owner)
- Walthall, Mississippi – Gen. Edward C. Walthall
- Walton (town), New York – William Walton (landowner)
- Walworth, New York – Reuben H. Walworth (politician)
- Ward, Indiana – Thomas B. Ward (U.S. representative)
- Wardner, Idaho – James Wardner (promoter of a local mine)
- Wardsboro, Vermont – William Ward (grantee)
- Wards Island (New York) – Jasper and Bartholomew Ward (landowners)
- Waresboro, Georgia – Nicholas Ware (U.S. Senator)
- Warner, New Hampshire – Jonathan Warner (leading Portsmouth citizen)
- Warnerville, New York – Capt. George Warner (settler)
- Warren, 6 places in Connecticut, Maine, Massachusetts, New York, Pennsylvania, and Vermont – Major General Joseph Warren
- Warren, New Hampshire and Warren, Rhode Island – Admiral Sir Peter Warren (British naval hero)
- Warren, Ohio – Moses Warren (surveyor)
- Warrenton, North Carolina – Major General Joseph Warren
- Warrenville, Illinois – Julius Warren (settler)
- Warwick, Rhode Island – Robert Rich, 2nd Earl of Warwick
- Washburn, Maine – Governor Israel Washburn Jr.
- Washington (state) and Washington, D.C. – George Washington
- Washington, 14 places in Georgia, Illinois, Indiana, Iowa, Kansas, Maine, Massachusetts, Michigan, Missouri, New Jersey, New Hampshire, New York, North Carolina, and Pennsylvania – George Washington
- Washington Court House, Ohio – George Washington
- Washington Crossing, New Jersey and Washington Crossing, Pennsylvania – George Washington
- Washington Terrace, Utah – George Washington
- Washingtonville, New York and Washingtonville, Pennsylvania – George Washington
- Waterboro, Maine – Colonel Joshua Waters (proprietor)
- Wathena, Kansas – Wathena (Native American chief)
- Watkins Glen, New York – Dr. Samuel Watkins (founder)
- Watkinsville, Georgia – Col. Robert Watkins (state legislator)
- Watrous, New Mexico – Samuel B. Watrous (settler)
- Watson, New York – James Watson (proprietor)
- Watson, West Virginia – Joseph Watson (landowner)
- Wattsburg, Pennsylvania – David Watts (settler)
- Wauponsee, Illinois – Waubonsie (Native American chief) (note the spelling)
- Wauseon, Ohio – Wauseon (Native American chief)
- Wayland, Massachusetts and Wayland, New York – Dr. Francis Wayland (president of Brown University)
- Waymansville, Indiana – Charles L. Wayman (founder)
- Wayne, Maine – Revolutionary War General Anthony Wayne
- Waynesboro, 3 places in Georgia, Mississippi, and Pennsylvania – Revolutionary War General Anthony Wayne
- Waynesburg, Pennsylvania and Waynesburg, Ohio – Revolutionary War General Anthony Wayne
- Waynesfield, Ohio – Revolutionary War General Anthony Wayne
- Waynesville, North Carolina and Waynesville, Ohio – Revolutionary War General Anthony Wayne
- Weare, New Hampshire – Meshech Weare (the town's first clerk)
- Weatherford, Texas – Jefferson Weatherford (settler)
- Webster, Massachusetts and Webster, New Hampshire – Daniel Webster
- Webster Groves, Missouri – Daniel Webster
- Weedsport, New York – Elisha and Edward Weed (settlers)
- Weedville, Arizona – Ora Rush Weed (founder)
- Weimar, California – a local Maidu chief
- Weir, Kansas – T.M. Weir (founder)
- Weissport, Pennsylvania – Col. Jacob Weiss (settler)
- Welch, West Virginia – Capt. J.A. Welch
- Welcome, Minnesota – Alfred M. Welcome (homesteader)
- Weld, Maine – Benjamin Weld (proprietor)
- Weldon, California – William B. Weldon (rancher)
- Wellington, Colorado – C. L. Wellington (employee of the Colorado and Southern Railway)
- Wellington, Kansas and Wellington, Maine – Arthur Wellesley, 1st Duke of Wellington
- Wells, Minnesota – the wife of Clark W. Thompson
- Wells, New York – Joshua Wells (settler)
- Wellsboro, Pennsylvania – Henry Wells Morris (resident)
- Wellsburg, West Virginia – Alexander Wells
- Wellsville, Kansas – D.L. Wells (railroad contractor)
- Wellsville, Ohio – William Wells (founder)
- Wendell, Massachusetts – Judge Oliver Wendell of Boston
- Wentworth, New Hampshire – Governor Benning Wentworth
- Wentzville, Missouri - Erasmus Livingston Wentz, chief engineer of the Northern Missouri Railroad
- Wesley, Maine and Wesley Township, Washington County, Ohio – John Wesley (founder of the English Methodist movement)
- Wesson, Mississippi – Col. J.M. Wesson (founder)
- West Gardiner, Maine – Dr. Sylvester Gardiner (Boston physician) (indirectly, via Gardiner, Maine)
- West Lafayette, Indiana and West Lafayette, Ohio – Gilbert du Motier, marquis de Lafayette
- West Richland, Washington – Nelson Rich (state legislator and land developer) (indirectly, via Richland, Washington)
- West Virginia – Virgin Queen
- West Warwick, Rhode Island – Robert Rich, 2nd Earl of Warwick (indirectly, via Warwick, Rhode Island)
- Westbrook, Maine – Colonel Thomas Westbrook (early settler)
- Westby, Wisconsin – O.T. Westby (settler)
- Westerlo, New York – Rev. Eilardus Westerlo
- Westmoreland, New Hampshire – John Fane, 7th Earl of Westmorland
- Westport, Oregon – John West
- Westville, California – George C. West (first postmaster)
- Westville, Mississippi – Col. Cato West
- Westville, Missouri – Dr. William S. West (postmaster)
- Wetmore, Kansas – W.T. Wetmore (railroader)
- Weyers Cave, Virginia – Bernard Weyer
- Wharton, New Jersey – Joseph Wharton (co-founder of Bethlehem Steel)
- Wharton, Texas – William H. Wharton and John A. Wharton (politicians)
- Whately, Massachusetts – Thomas Whately (Member of Parliament)
- Wheeler, New York – Capt. Silas Wheeler (settler)
- Wheelock, Vermont – Eleazar Wheelock (founder of Dartmouth College)
- Whipple Mountains (California) – Amiel Weeks Whipple (military engineer)
- White, South Dakota – W.H. White (settler)
- White Cloud Township, Mills County, Iowa and White Cloud, Kansas – Ma-Hush-Kah (Native American chief)
- Whitefield, Maine and Whitefield, New Hampshire – George Whitefield (English evangelist)
- White Haven, Pennsylvania – Josiah White
- Whitesboro, New York – Judge Hugh White (settler)
- Whitestown, New York – Judge Hugh White (settler)
- Whiteville, North Carolina – James B. White (state legislator)
- Whiting, Iowa – Charles Whiting (judge)
- Whiting, Maine – Timothy Whiting (settler)
- Whiting, Vermont – John Whiting (landholder)
- Whitingham, Vermont – Nathan Whiting (landholder)
- Whitinsville, Massachusetts – Paul C. Whitin (cotton mill owner)
- Whitman, Massachusetts – Augustus Whitman (landowner)
- Whitman, Washington – Dr. Marcus Whitman (missionary)
- Whitney, California – Joel Parker Whitney (rancher)
- Whitney Point, New York – Thomas Whitney (postmaster)
- Whitneyville, Connecticut – Eli Whitney (founder)
- Whitneyville, Maine – Colonel Joseph Whitney (mill owner)
- Whittier, Alaska – John Greenleaf Whittier (Poet)
- Whittier, California – John Greenleaf Whittier (Poet)
- Wibaux, Montana – Pierre Wibaux (cattle rancher)
- Wickenburg, Arizona – Henry Wickenburg (discoverer of the Vulture Mine)
- Wiggins, Colorado – Oliver P. Wiggins (frontiersman)
- Wilber, Nebraska – C.D. Wilber (founder)
- Wilcox, Pennsylvania – A.I. Wilcox
- Wilcox Township, Michigan – S.N. Wilcox
- Wildomar, California – Wil – William Collier, Do – Donald Graham, Mar – Margaret Collier (city founders)
- Wilkes County, Georgia and Wilkes County, North Carolina – John Wilkes
- Wilkes-Barre, Pennsylvania – John Wilkes and Isaac Barré
- Wilkesboro, North Carolina – John Wilkes
- Wilkinsburg, Pennsylvania – William Wilkins (Secretary of War)
- Willet, New York – Colonel Marinus Willet
- Williams, California – W.H. Williams (planner of the townsite)
- Williams Bay, Wisconsin – Captain Israel Williams (settler who fought in the War of 1812)
- Williamsburg, Ohio – Gen. William Haines Lytle (founder)
- Williamsburg, Virginia – William III of England
- Williamsport, Indiana – Gov. James D. Williams
- Williamsport, Pennsylvania – William Hepburn (judge)
- Williams River (Vermont) – Rev. John Williams
- Williamson, New York – Charles Williamson (land agent)
- Williamson River (Oregon) – Lt. Robert S. Williamson (explorer)
- Williamston, South Carolina – Col. James Williams
- Williamstown, Kentucky – William Arnold (settler)
- Williamstown, Massachusetts – Ephraim Williams
- Williamstown, Vermont – Ephraim Williams (indirectly, via Williamston, Mass.)
- Williamsville, Missouri – Asa E. Williams (founder)
- Williamsville, New York – Jonas Williams (settler)
- Willis, Kansas – Martin Cleveland Willis (settler)
- Williston, North Dakota – Associate Justice Lorenzo P. Williston
- Williston, Vermont – Samuel Willis (landholder)
- Willits, California – Hiram Willits (landowner, early settler)
- Willoughby, Ohio – Dr. Westel Willoughby, Jr. (U.S. Representative from New York)
- Willoughby Hills, Ohio – Dr. Westel Willoughby, Jr.
- Wilmette, Illinois – Antoine Ouilmette (French-Canadian fur trader)
- Wilmington, 4 places in Delaware, Massachusetts, North Carolina, and Vermont – Spencer Compton, 1st Earl of Wilmington
- Wilmot, New Hampshire – Dr. James Wilmot (English clergyman)
- Wilseyville, California – Lawrence A. Wilsey (corporate executive)
- Wilson, Kansas – Hiero T. Wilson (merchant from Fort Scott)
- Wilson (town), New York – Reuben Wilson (settler)
- Wilson and Wilson County, North Carolina – Colonel Louis D. Wilson (state senator)
- Wilton, New Hampshire – Sir Joseph Wilton (English sculptor) (Note: Gannett (1902, p. 275) claims the town in New Hampshire is named for a town in England.)
- Winchester, Massachusetts – Colonel William P. Winchester
- Winchester, New Hampshire – Charles Paulet, 3rd Duke of Bolton, 8th Marquess of Winchester, and constable of the Tower of London
- Windham, New Hampshire – Sir Charles Wyndham, 2nd Earl of Egremont (note spelling)
- Windom, Kansas and Windom, Minnesota – Senator William Windom
- Windsor, Colorado – Rev. Samuel Asa Windsor
- Winfield, Kansas – Chaplain Winfield Scott
- Winfield (town), New York – Gen. Winfield Scott
- Winifred, Montana - Winifred Hoyt Sewall Jones (1893–1988), daughter of a vicepresident of Chicago, Milwaukee & St. Paul railway company
- Winn, Maine – John M. Winn (landholder)
- Winnie, Texas – Fox Winnie (railroad contractor)
- Winnsboro, South Carolina – Gen. Richard Winn (founder)
- Winslow, Maine – General John Winslow
- Winston-Salem, North Carolina – Joseph Winston
- Winters, California – Theodore W. Winters (landowner)
- Winthrop, Maine – John Winthrop (first Governor of Massachusetts)
- Winthrop, Massachusetts – Deane Winthrop (son of John Winthrop, the first Governor of Massachusetts)
- Wofford Heights, California – I.L. Wofford (founder)
- Wolcott, Connecticut – Frederick Wolcott
- Wolcott, New York and Wolcott, Vermont – General Oliver Wolcott (a signer of the Declaration of Independence)
- Wolfeboro, New Hampshire – English General James Wolfe
- Womelsdorf, Pennsylvania – Joseph Wommelsdorf (founder) (note the spelling)
- Woodbury, Vermont – Col. Ebenezer Wood (grantee)
- Woodfords, California – Daniel Woodford (early settler)
- Woodhull, New York – Gen. Nathaniel Woodhull
- Woodleaf, California – James Wood (property owner)
- Woodsfield, Ohio – Archibald Woods (resident of Wheeling, West Virginia)
- Woodsonville, Kentucky – Thomas Woodson (senator)
- Woodville, Texas – George Tyler Wood (governor of Texas)
- Woody, California – Dr. Sparrell Walter Woody (local rancher)
- Wooster, Ohio – Gen. David Wooster
- Worth, New York – Gen. William J. Worth
- Worthington, Massachusetts – Col. John Worthington (proprietor)
- Worthington, Minnesota – the maiden name of the wife of A.P. Miller (founder)
- Wray, Colorado – John Wray (foreman)
- Wright, New York – Silas Wright (politician)
- Wright City, Missouri – Dr. H.C. Wright (settler)
- Wrightsboro, Georgia – Augustus R. Wright (judge)
- Wrightstown, Wisconsin – H.S. Wright (ferry owner)
- Wrightsville, Pennsylvania – Samuel Wright (settler)
- Wurtsboro, New York – Maurice and William Wurts (builders of the Delaware and Hudson Canal)
- Wyandanch, New York – Wyandanch (sachem of the Montaukett Native American tribe in the mid 17th century)
- Wytheville, Virginia – George Wythe (a signer of the Declaration of Independence)

== Y ==
- Yankee Jims, California – a criminal with that nickname
- Yale, Michigan – Elihu Yale (indirectly, via Yale University)
- Yaquina Bay (Oregon) – Yaquina (Native American chief)
- Yates Center, Kansas – Abner Yates (landowner)
- Ybor City, Tampa, Florida – Vicente Martinez Ybor
- Yellville, Arkansas – Governor Archibald Yell
- Yonkers, New York – Adriaen van der Donck (landowner who known locally as the Jonkheer)
- Yorba Linda, California – Bernardo Yorba (built Yorba Hacienda near here)
- York, Maine – James II of England (known as the Duke of York before ascending the throne)
- York Center, Illinois - Samuel York
- Yorkville, California – R.H. York (Founder)
- Yorkville, Wisconsin - Samuel York
- Youngs, California – Morgan W. Youngs (first postmaster)
- Youngs Bay (Washington) – Sir Charles Young (naval officer)
- Youngstown, New York – John Young (merchant)
- Youngstown, Ohio – John Young (Founder)
- Ypsilanti, Michigan – Demetrius Ypsilanti (hero in the Greek War of Independence)

== Z ==
- Zanesfield, Ohio – Isaac Zane (younger brother of Ebenezer Zane)
- Zanesville, Ohio – Ebenezer Zane (founder)
- Zapata, Texas – Colonel Jose Antonio de Zapata
- Zavalla, Texas – Lorenzo de Zavala (note spelling)
- Zebulon, Georgia – Zebulon Pike
- Zenda, Wisconsin - Anthony Hope, author of The Prisoner Of Zenda
- Zillah, Washington – Miss Zillah Oakes (daughter of Thomas Fletcher Oakes, president of the Northern Pacific Railway)
- Zionsville, Indiana – William Zion (pioneer)
- Zwingle, Iowa – Huldrych Zwingli (Protestant reformer)

== Former names ==
- Adams was the name of Corte Madera, California – Jerry Adams (first postmaster)
- Adele was the name of Fields Landing, California – Adele Haughwout (first European child born there)
- Alexander's Corner was the name of Weedpatch, California – Cal Alexander (early resident)
- Allen's Camp was the name of Caliente, California – Gabriel Allen (early settler)
- Arp's' was the name of Riverview, Kern County, California – James H. Arp (real estate developer)
- Barker House was the name of Woodleaf, California – Charles Barker (early settler)
- Barrons Landing was the name of Eden Landing, California – Richard Barron (landowner)
- Barrow was the name of Utqiaġvik, Alaska – Sir John Barrow
- Beal's Landing was the name of Westport, California – Samuel Beal (early settler)
- Bells Harbor was the name of Little River, California – Lloyd and Samuel Bell (early settlers)
- Benton Mills was the name of Ridleys Ferry, California – Senator Thomas Hart Benton
- Biddle's Camp and Biddleville were names of Bear Valley, Mariposa County, California – William C. Biddle (early settler)
- Black's was the name of Zamora, California – J.J. Black (early settler)
- Boust City was the name of Taft Heights, California – E.J. Boust (oilman, town founder)
- Bowman's Point was the name of West End, Alameda, California – Charles C. Bowman (early settler)
- Brannan Springs was the name of Woodfords, California – Samuel Brannan (Gold Rush figure)
- Brown's was the name of North Fork, California – Milton Brown (early settler)
- Brown's Mill was the name of Stafford, Humboldt County, California – Percy Brown (lumber mill owner)
- Brownsville was the name of Samoa, California – James D.H. Brown (dairy farmer)
- Brownsville was the name of Tecopa, California – William D. and Robert D. Brown (founders)
- Buckingham was the name of Unity, New Hampshire – John Hobart, 1st Earl of Buckinghamshire
- Bucktooth was the name of Salamanca (town), New York – Bucktooth (notable Native American who lived in the area)
- Bulwinkle was the name of Crannell, California – Conrad Bullwinkle (landowner)
- Burns' Camp and Burns' Ranch were names of Quartzburg, Mariposa County, California – Robert and John Burns (founders)
- Burrville was the name of Clinton, Tennessee – Aaron Burr
- Cabarker was the name of El Centro, California – C.A. Barker (landowner's friend)
- Cantu was the name of Andrade, California – Col. Esteban Cantu (Mexican regional governor)
- Cardigan was the name of Orange, New Hampshire – George Brudenell, fourth Earl of Cardigan
- Carson's Creek was the name of Angels Camp, California – Kit Carson
- Charley's Flat was the name of Dutch Flat, California – Charles Dornbach (founder)
- Clark's Station and Clark's Ranch were names of Wawona, California – Galen Clark (founder)
- Clifton was the name of Del Rey, California – Clift Wilkinson (town founder)
- Cochran's Crossing was the name of Yolo, California – Thomas Cochran (early settler)
- Cockermouth was the name of Groton, New Hampshire – Charles Wyndham, Baron Cockermouth and Earl of Egremont
- Collis was the name of Kerman, California – Collis Potter Huntington
- Converse Ferry was the name of Friant, California – Charles Converse (ferryman)
- Cowan Station was the name of Dunmovin, California – James Cowan (homesteader)
- Crabtown was the name of Helena, Montana – John Crab (early gold prospector)
- Crumville was the name of Ridgecrest, California – James and Robert Crum (local dairymen)
- Dewey and Deweyville were names of Wasco, California – Adm. George Dewey
- Dorris Bridge was the name of Alturas, California – Pressley and James Dorris (early settlers)
- Dow's Prairie was the name of McKinleyville, California – Joe Dow (founder)
- Drapersville was the name of Kingsburg, California – Josiah Draper (founder)
- Dupplin was the name of Lempster, New Hampshire – Scottish lord Thomas Hay, Viscount Dupplin
- Durkee's Ferry was the name of Weitchpec, California – Clark W. Durkee (ferry operator)
- Dutch Charlie's Flat was the name of Dutch Flat, California – Charles Dornbach (founder)
- Dykesboro was the name of Cochran, Georgia – B. B. Dykes (settler)
- Eastland was the name of Mill Valley, California – Joseph G. Eastland (developer)
- Enfield was the name of a Massachusetts town that was disincorporated on April 28, 1938, as part of the creation of the Quabbin Reservoir – Robert Field (early settler)
- Etter was the name of Ettersburg, California – Albert F. Etter (homesteader)
- Fassking's Station was the name of Encinal, Alameda, California – Frederick Louis Fassking (pioneer)
- Fletcher was the name of Aurora, Colorado – Donald Fletcher (businessman)
- Foremans was the name of Fourth Crossing, California – David Foreman (town founder)
- Franklin Township was the name of Nutley, New Jersey – Benjamin Franklin
- Greenwich was the name of a Massachusetts town that was disincorporated on April 28, 1938, as part of the creation of the Quabbin Reservoir – John Campbell, Duke of Greenwich
- Grenville was the name of Newport, New Hampshire – George Grenville (Prime Minister of the United Kingdom)
- Hamilton's was the name of Buck Meadows, California – Alva Hamilton (founder)
- Hamptonville was the name of Friant, California – William R. Hampton (first postmaster)
- Hans Lof's was the name of Toms Place, California – Hans Lof (resort owner)
- Hansen was the name of Alton, California – Mads P. Hansen (first postmaster)
- Harrisberry was the name of Harrisburg, Inyo County, California – Shorty Harris and Pete Auguerreberry (gold discoverers)
- Harrisburgh was the name of Warm Springs, Fremont, California – Abram Harris (early settler)
- Haydenville was the name of Bear Valley, Mariposa County, California – David, Charles, and William Hayden (gold miners)
- Hearst was the name of Hacienda, California – Phoebe Hearst
- Hopkins and Hopkins Springs was the name of Soda Springs, Nevada County, California – Mark Hopkins (railroad baron who built a resort there)
- Hunter Flat and Hunters Camp were names of Whitney Portal, California – William L. Hunter (pioneer)
- Hupp and Hupps Mill were names of DeSabla, California – John Hupp (early sawmill owner)
- Hutton's Ranch was the name of Yolo, California – James A. Hutton (early hotel owner)
- Jacksonville was the name of Floyd, Virginia – President Andrew Jackson
- Jewetta' was the name of Saco, California – Solomon and Philo D. Jewett (pioneers)
- Joe was the name of Ismay, Montana – Joe Montana, (American Football player)
- Johnson's Diggings was the name of Birchville, California – David Johnson (first prospector at the site)
- Johnsonville was the name of Bear Valley, Mariposa County, California – John F. Johnson (early settler)
- Jones Ferry was the name of Friant, California – J.R. Jones (early merchant)
- Kellyvale was the name of Lowell, Vermont – John Kelley (grantee)
- Kendall's City was the name of Boonville, California – Alonzo Kendall (early hotelier)
- Kents Landing was the name of Little River, California – W.H. Kent (early settler, landowner)
- Kenyon was the name of Pineridge, California – Silas W. Kenyon (first postmaster)
- Kunze was the name of Greenwater, California – Arthur Kunze (founder)
- Langville was the name of Capay, California – John Arnold Lang (early settler)
- Laphams was the name of Stateline, California – William W. Lapham (hotel owner)
- Levittown and Levittown Township were names of Willingboro Township, New Jersey (from 1958 to 1963) – William Levitt
- Lewisville was the name of Greenwood, El Dorado County, California – Lewis B. Meyer (early settler)
- Lisbon was the name of Applegate, California – Lisbon Applegate (early settler)
- Maltermoro was the name of Sunnyside, Fresno County, California – George H. Malter (postmaster)
- Marthasville was the name of Atlanta, Georgia – Martha Lumpkin (daughter of Governor Wilson Lumpkin)
- Marsh was the name of Avon, Contra Costa County, California – John Marsh
- Marshall was the name of Lotus, California – James W. Marshall
- Marshs Landing was the name of Antioch, California – John Marsh
- Maxwell's Creek was the name of Coulterville, California – George Maxwell (early settler)
- McKinney was the name of Chambers Lodge, California – John McKinney (early settler)
- Meiggstown was the name of Mendocino, California – Henry Meiggs
- Michaels was the name of Coarsegold, California – Charles Michaels (merchant)
- Mingusville was the name of Wibaux, Montana – Minnie and Gus Grisy (postmasters)
- Minorsville was the name of McKinleyville, California – Isaac Minor (founder)
- Moores was the name of Riverton, California – John M. Moore (operator of a local toll road)
- Moores Station was the name of Honcut, California – John C. Moore (first postmaster)
- Norris was the name of Lake Delton, Wisconsin – Edward Norris (surveyor)
- Old Lovelock was the name of Coutolenc, California – George Lovelock (early merchant)
- Partridgefield was the name of Hinsdale, Massachusetts – Oliver Partridge (one of the purchasers of the town)
- Peacock's was the name of Warm Springs, Fremont, California – George W. Peacock (first postmaster)
- Peterman's Landing was the name of Eden Landing, California – Henry Louis and Mary F. Peterman (salt company officials)
- Phillipsburg was the name of Hollis, Maine – Major William Phillips (proprietor)
- Phipps-Canada was the name of Jay, Maine – Captain Joseph Phipps
- Pollasky was the name of Friant, California – Marcus Pollasky (railroad official)
- Portersville was the name of Valparaiso, Indiana – Commodore David Porter
- Powellville was the name of Blocksburg, California – Joseph James Powell (first settler)
- Prescott was the name of a Massachusetts town that was disincorporated on April 28, 1938, as part of the creation of the Quabbin Reservoir – Colonel William Prescott
- Putnam's was the name of Independence, California – Charles Putnam (early merchant)
- Ralston City was the name of Shakespeare, New Mexico – William Chapman Ralston
- Ralston Point was the name of Arvada, Colorado – Lewis Ralston (prospector from Georgia)
- Randall was the name of White Hall, California – Albert B. Randall (first postmaster)
- Rolph was the name of Fairhaven, California – James Rolph (governor of California)
- Rooptown was the name of Susanville, California – Isaac Roop (settler)
- Ross Landing was the name of Kentfield, California – James Ross (founder)
- Ross's Camp was the name of Melbourne Camp, California – William Ross (operator)
- Rust was the name of El Cerrito, Contra Costa County, California – William R. Rust (first postmaster)
- Ryan was the name of Lila C, California – John Ryan (borax company official)
- Scodie was the name of Onyx, California – William Scodie (early merchant)
- Sherburne was the name of Killington, Vermont – Colonel Benjamin Sherburne (landholder)
- Simpsonville was the name of Bear Valley, Mariposa County, California – Robert Simpson (local merchant)
- Smith's Landing was the name of Antioch, California – William and Joseph Smith (early settlers)
- Smithville was the name of Loomis, California – L.G. Smith (store owner)
- Sotoville was the name of Santa Rita, Monterey County, California – Jose Manuel Soto (landowner, founder)
- Spoonville was the name of Edgemont, Lassen County, California – Lorella A. Spoon
- Stantonville was the name of Chilton, Wisconsin – Moses and Catherine Stanton (early residents)
- Stratton was the name of Stratford, California – William Stratton (developer)
- Stubbs was the name of Clearlake Oaks, California – Charles Stubbs (landowner)
- Surrattsville was the name of Clinton, Maryland – Surratt family (18th century settlers)
- Swauger was the name of Loleta, California – Samuel A. Swauger (landowner)
- Taylors Landing was the name of Bijou, California – Almon M. Taylor (founder)
- Tinkers Station was the name of Soda Springs, Nevada County, California – J.A. Tinker (local freight hauler)
- Townsend was the name of Boothbay, Maine and Southport, Maine – Charles Townshend, 2nd Viscount Townshend (note spelling)
- Trecothick was the name of Ellsworth, New Hampshire – Barlow Trecothick (Alderman, Member of Parliament, and a Lord Mayor of London, raised in colonial Boston)
- Troupville was the name of Valdosta, Georgia - George Troup, governor of Georgia
- Turner was the name of Harriman, New York – Peter Turner (early restaurateur)
- Vaughn was the name of Bodfish, California – Edward Vaughn (first postmaster)
- Villa de San Agustin de Laredo was the name of Laredo, Texas – Saint Augustine
- Warnersville was the name of Trinidad, California – R.V. Warner (early settler)
- Washington was the name of South River, New Jersey – George Washington
- Washington Township was the name of Robbinsville Township, New Jersey – George Washington
- Wells was the name of Keene, California – Madison P. Wells (early rancher)
- Wendell was the name of Sunapee, New Hampshire – John Wendell (proprietor)
- Weringdale was the name of Woody, California – Joseph Weringer (town planner)
- Wheelersborough was the name of Hampden, Maine – Benjamin Wheeler (settler)
- Whitley's Ford was the name of Lookout, California – James W. Whitley (early hotelier)
- Williamsburg was the name of Old Town, Kern County, California – James E. Williams (businessman)
- Woods Dry Diggings was the name of Auburn, California – John S. Wood
- Yanks was the name of Meyers, California – Ephraim "Yank" Clement (early landowner)

== See also ==
- List of places named after people
  - List of country subdivisions named after people
  - List of islands named after people
- Buildings and structures named after people
  - List of educational institutions named after U.S. presidents
  - List of eponyms of airports
  - List of convention centers named after people
  - List of railway stations named after people
- Lists of places by eponym
- List of non-US places that have a US place named after them
- List of eponyms
- Lists of etymologies

== Bibliography ==
- Baker, Ronald L. (1995). From Needmore to Prosperity: Hoosier Place Names in Folklore and History. Bloomington: Indiana University Press. ISBN 0253328667.
- Callary, Edward (2008). Place Names of Illinois. Urbana: University of Illinois Press. ISBN 978-0-252-03356-8.
- Chadbourne, Ava Harriet (1955). Maine Place Names and the Peopling of Its Towns. Portland, Me.: Bond Wheelwright Company. ISBN 9780870271120.
- Fulmore, Z.T. (1915). The History and Geography of Texas as Told in County Names. Austin, Tex.: E.L. Steck.
- Gannett, Henry (1902). The Origin of Certain Place Names in the United States (PDF). Bulletin of the United States Geological Survey. Washington, D.C.: Government Printing Office.
- HalliBurton, W. H. (1903). A Topographical Description and History of Arkansas County, Arkansas, from 1541 to 1875. History of Arkansas County, Arkansas, 1541-1875. p. 47. hdl:2027/wu.89072963770. OCLC 5815561 – via HathiTrust.
- Kenny, Hamill (1945). West Virginia Place Names: Their Origin and Meaning, Including the Nomenclature of Mountains and Streams. Piedmont, W.Va.: The Place Name Press.
- Powell, William S.; Hill, Michael (2010). The North Carolina Gazetteer: A Dictionary of Tar Heel Places and Their History (2nd ed.). Chapel Hill: University of North Carolina Press. ISBN 978-0-8078-3399-5.
- Meany, Edmond S. (1923). Origin of Washington Geographic Names. Seattle: University of Washington Press.
- Miller, Larry L. (2001). Tennessee Place Names. Bloomington: Indiana University Press. ISBN 0253339847.
- Romig, Walter (1986). Michigan Place Names: The History of the Founding and the Naming of More Than Five Thousand Past and Present Michigan Communities. Detroit: Wayne State University Press. ISBN 9780814318386.
- Savage, Tom (2007). A Dictionary of Iowa Place-Names. Iowa City: University of Iowa Press. ISBN 978-1-58729-531-7.
- Upham, Warren (1920). Minnesota Geographic Names: Their Origin and Historic Significance. Collections of the Minnesota Historical Society; v. 17. St. Paul, Minn.: Minnesota Historical Society.
