= Roop's Fort =

- U.S. National Register of Historic Places
- California Historical Landmark
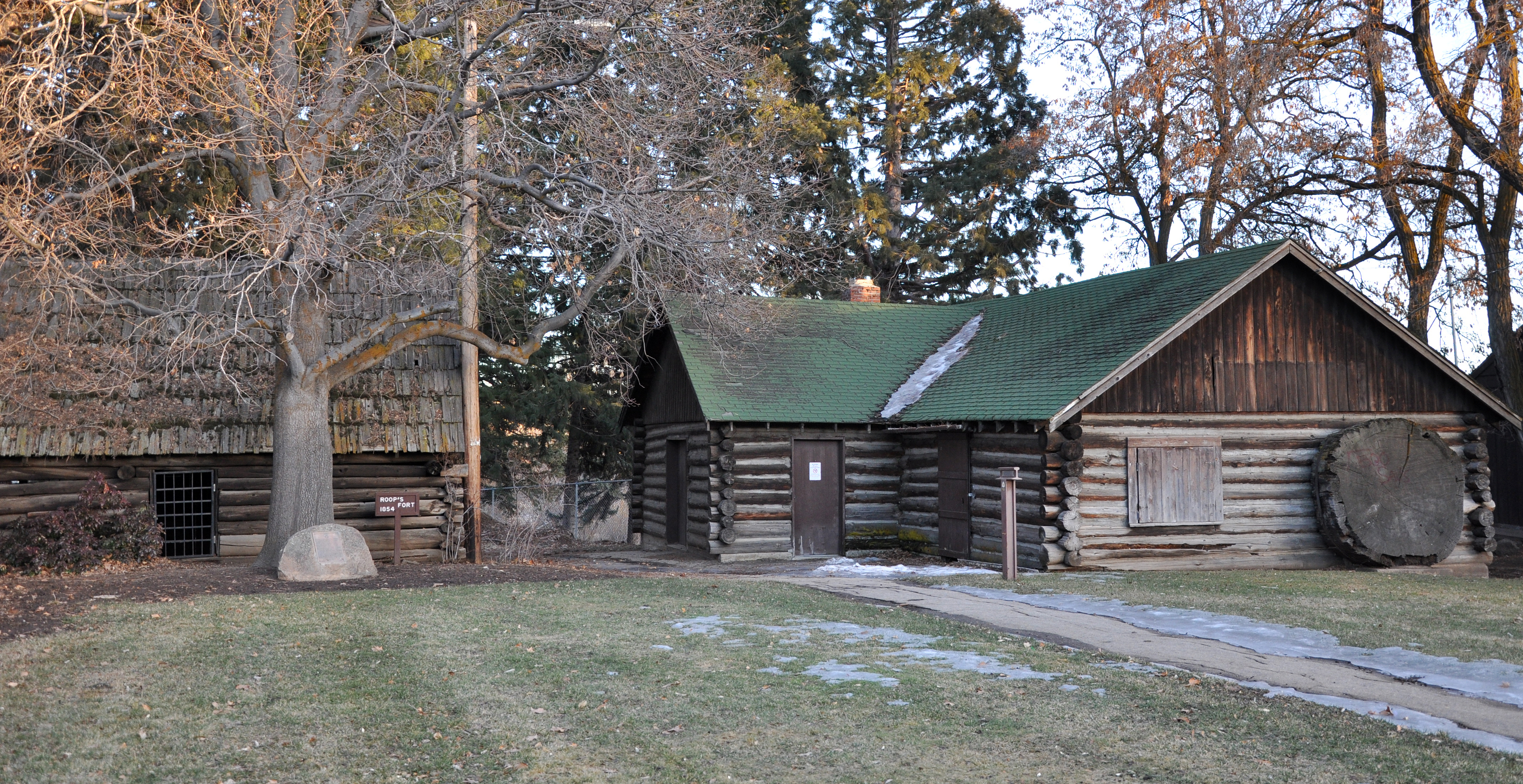
- Roop's Fort in 2013

- Location within California Location within the United States
- Location: N. Weatherlow St., Susanville, California
- Coordinates: 40°25′8″N 120°39′20″W
- Area: 1 acre (0.40 ha)
- Built: 1854
- Architectural style: Log Cabin
- NRHP reference No.: 74000516
- CHISL No.: 76
- Added to NRHP: May 2, 1974

Roop's Fort, also known as Roop's Trading Post, Fort Defiance, and Roop House, is a historic building in Susanville, California. The building, which was built in 1854 by Isaac Roop, was the first building built by white settlers in Lassen County. The fort was originally a trading post for westbound migrants and was the first post west of Fort Hall in Idaho. The building also served as the capitol of the short-lived Nataqua Territory, a territory created in 1856 to avoid California tax collectors. The territory was incorporated into Roop County, Nevada, named for Isaac Roop, in 1861. California and Nevada entered into a border dispute known as the Sagebrush War over the Susanville area in 1863, and Roop's Fort served as a fort for the Nevadans during the skirmish. California won the war, and Roop's Fort became part of Lassen County in 1864.

It is a California Historical Landmark (#76), and it was listed on the National Register of Historic Places in 1974.

== See also ==
- California Historical Landmarks in Lassen County
