= Farum =

Town in Denmark

- Town
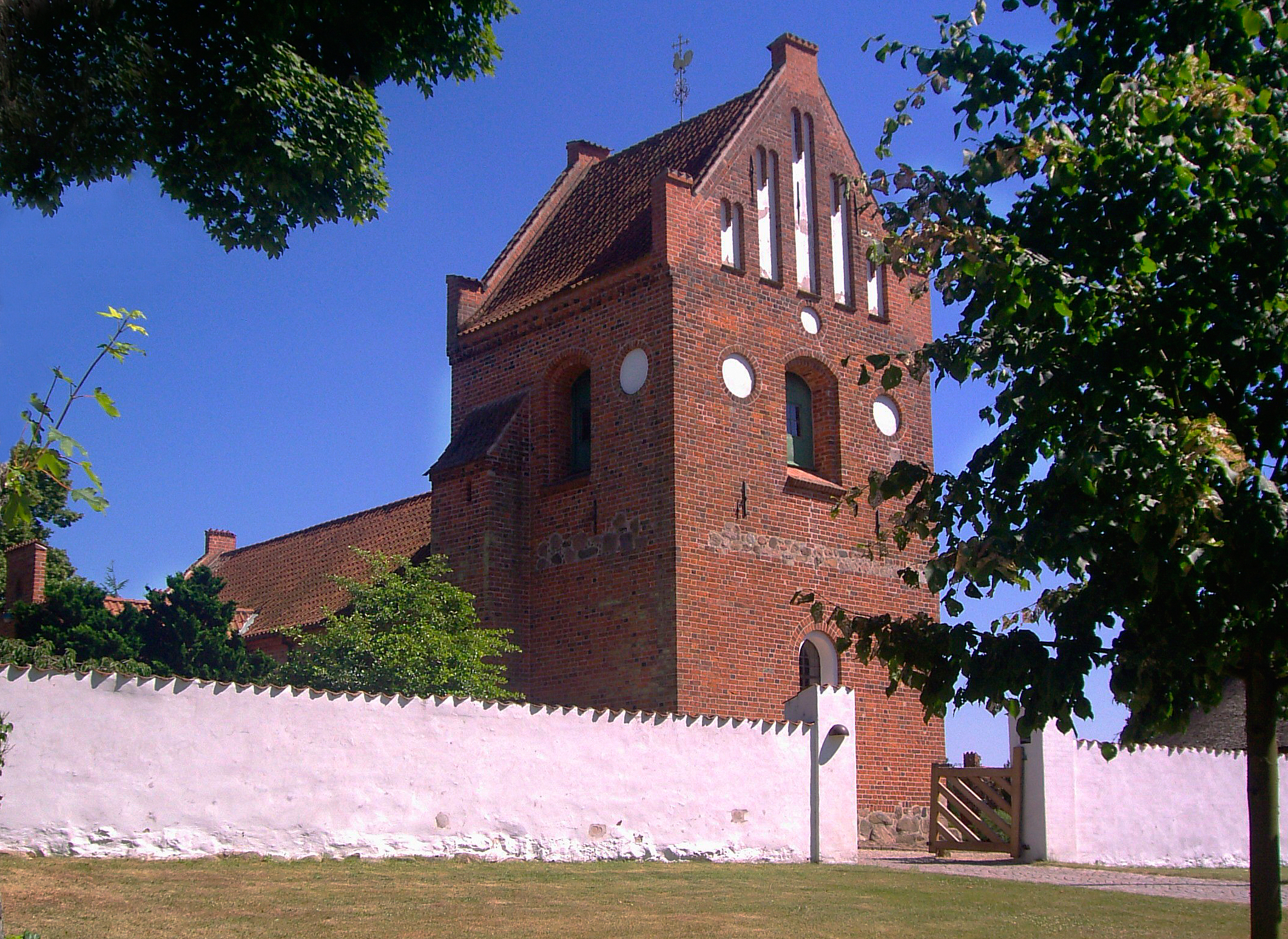
- Farum church

- Location in Denmark Farum (Capital Region)
- Coordinates: 55°48′30″N 12°21′29″E
- Country: Denmark
- Region: Region Hovedstaden
- Municipality: Furesø Municipality

Area
  - Urban: 7.8 km^{2} (3.0 sq mi)

Population (2026)
  - Urban: 20,558
  - Urban density: 2,600/km^{2} (6,800/sq mi)
  - Gender: 9,928 males and 10,630 females
- Time zone: UTC+1 (CET)
  - Summer (DST): UTC+2 (CEST)
- Postal code: 3520 Farum

Farum is a town on the northeast of the island of Zealand in eastern Denmark, 20 km northwest of Copenhagen. The town has a population of 20,558 (1 January 2026). The town is part of Furesø Municipality. Until 2006, it constituted Farum Municipality.

== History ==
Farum has existed for more than 1000 years. The name Farum refers to the founding fathers, sea merchants, who migrated from Bremen, Germany. At the time there was clear passage from the sea to Farum. This has since been filled with silt and by civic demands for more land. Around 1100, the community's first stone church was built: parts of it remain in the present church of Farum. In the 14th century, a damming project flooded the old ford and redirected much of the traffic bound for Copenhagen towards Fiskebæk, a short distance further south.

During recurrent wars with Sweden in the 17th century the area suffered enormous damage.

In 1800, the town was transferred from Copenhagen knight district to Frederiksborg County. Around this time, the economy of the area revived with renewed cultivation of the fertile agricultural land. Throughout the 19th century, the community expanded economically. In 1906, the community was linked to the capital by the railway between Copenhagen and Slangerup: in 1977, this became the Hareskovbanen radial of Copenhagen's S-train system.

In the early 1950s, the population was about 4000. Through the 1960s and 1970s, the community turned into a commuter town due to its proximity to Copenhagen and the population expanded past 10,000. By 1980, the population was over 16,000.

== Farum in recent times ==
Today, Farum is divided into four parts: Farum West, Farum East, Farum North, and the Midpoint. Farum East and Farum West are separated by a highway that effectively divides the city. The Midpoint (Danish Midtpunktet) is a large complex of apartments built in a very special way. One-third of the population lives in these blocks, which house most of Farum's immigrants.

Farum West is the old part of Farum, with the old village and church. The area has grown over the years, and most of the sports facilities are here. To the north of Farum West lies the high-tech industrial area.

The town is now influenced strongly by the large number of immigrants living in the city. In the Midpoint over 50 different languages are spoken. The majority of the immigrants are Turks and people from the Middle East. This has given Farum a large number of foreign shops and exotic food. In recent years, many people from eastern Europe have settled in the town.

Farum is also the hometown of the football club FC Nordsjælland, which plays in the highest Danish league, Danish Superliga. They play at Right to Dream Park, in Farum West.

It has previously been the hometown of the handball club Ajax Farum.

From 1985 to 2002, the Mayor of Farum was the controversial Peter Brixtofte. Brixtofte was later charged with corruption and jailed.

== Notable people ==
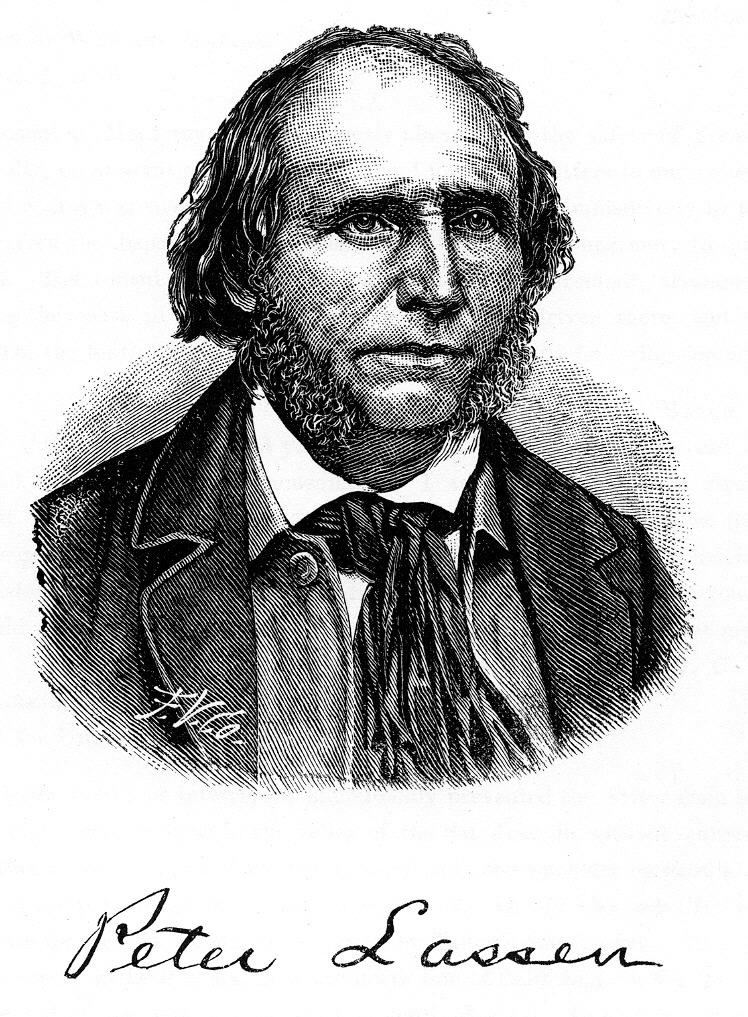
Peter Lassen, 1882

- Peter Lassen (1800 in Farum – 1859) a Danish-American rancher and prospector. Namesake of Lassen Volcanic National Park, Lassen Peak, Lassen National Forest, Lassen Emigrant Trail (also called the Lassen Cutoff), Banner Lassen Medical Center, and Lassen Community College, all in California
- Christine Swane (1876 – 1960 in Farum) a painter with Funen Painters and a Cubist style
- Dagmar Starcke (1899 – 1975 in Farum) a Danish painter and textile artist
- Preben Neergaard (1920 in Farum – 1990) a Danish stage and film actor
- Willy Rathnov (1937 – 1999 in Farum) a Danish film actor
- Povl Dissing (born 1938) a Danish singer, composer, guitarist and harmonica player
- Peter Brixtofte (1949–2016 in Farum) politician, Member of the Folketinget, Govt. Minister, Mayor of Farum, subsequently convicted of local fraudulent practice and jailed
- Allan K. Pedersen (born 1962) a Danish businessman, owns FC Nordsjælland, lives in Farum
- Sebastian Jespersen (born 1973 in Farum) the CEO and co-founder of the digital agency Vertic
- Lars Halvor Jensen (born 1973) record producer and songwriter, brought up in Farum
- Christine Lorentzen (born 1979) singer-songwriter and former TV presenter, lives in Farum
- Sofie Hagen (born 1988) a Danish comedian, who grew up in Farum

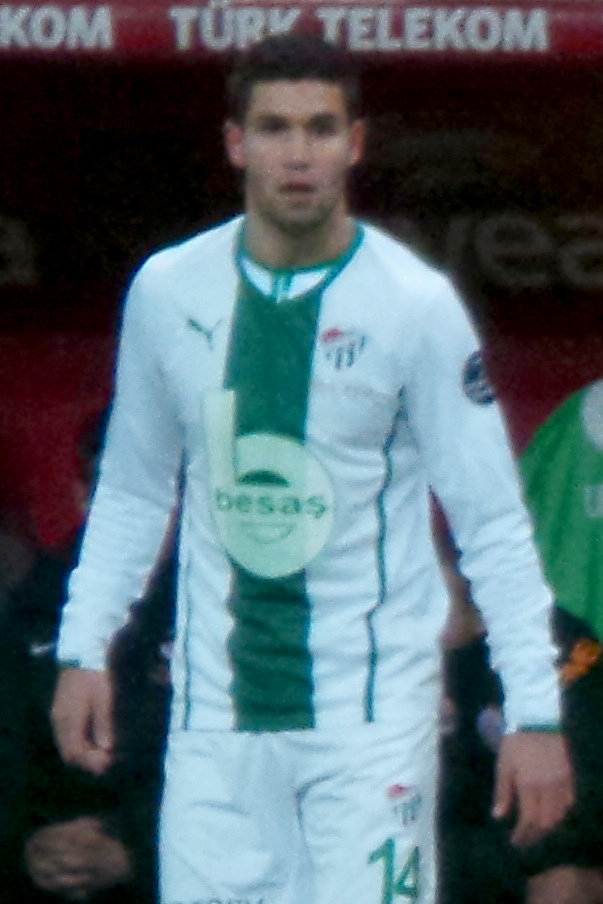
Oğuz Han Aynaoğlu, 2014

=== Sport ===
- Svend Jacobsen (1906 – 1986 in Farum) a fencer, competed in the 1936 Summer Olympics
- Jesper Helledie (born 1954) a badminton player, former badminton World Champions
- Rasmus Nørby (born 1982) a retired Danish tennis player, lives in Farum
- Jeppe Curth (born 1984 in Farum) a retired Danish footballer, over 300 club caps
- Mike Tullberg (born 1985 in Farum) a football manager and former player
- Jon Raahauge Rud (born 1986 in Farum) swimmer, competed in the 2008 Summer Olympics
- Oğuz Han Aynaoğlu (born 1992 in Farum) a Turkish-Danish footballer
- Marcus Ingvartsen (born 1996 in Farum) a Danish footballer, began with FC Nordsjælland

== See also ==
- Farumgaard
- Farum Rectory
- Farum railway station
- Peter Brixtofte
