= Sagebrush War =

Armed conflict between California and Nevada

The Sagebrush War (also known as the Boundary War, the War of Injunctions or the Roop County War) was an armed conflict between citizens of Plumas County, California and those of the now-defunct Roop County, Nevada regarding jurisdiction over the Honey Lake Valley and Susanville, California.

== Background ==
In 1850, the U.S. Congress approved the 120th meridian west as the newly admitted State of California's eastern boundary. However, because no formal geographical survey had yet been done, most assumed this line just tracked the crest of the Sierra Nevada mountains, including the new residents of California.

Some settlers of interior northeastern California, geographically isolated from the more populated coastal regions, believed they were too far east to be a part of California and simultaneously sought to break their association with the Mormons of the Utah Territory, and thus founded their own territorial government for the unofficial Nataqua Territory in 1856. Others refused to pay taxes to Plumas County officials when they appeared to collect, claiming their land was in Nevada, and similarly refused to pay Nevada officials when they appeared. However, as the population grew in the Honey Lake Valley, both California and Nevada saw the lack of taxes in the area as an increasingly unacceptable situation. Newer settlers were more sympathetic toward Plumas and California authorities, for need of public school funds and protection against Native Americans.

== Conflict ==
With overlapping jurisdictions, judges and justices began issuing orders attempting to override the other's elected authority. John S. Ward, probate judge of Roop County, was first to issue an injunction restraining William J. Young, a justice of the peace for Plumas County, from exercising his official functions. Refusing, he was fined $100 for contempt of court.

In retaliation, another judge, E. T. Hogan, ordered the arrest of Ward and one other judge from Roop County after they continued to exercise jurisdiction over the Honey Lake Valley. When Plumas County sheriff E. H. Pierce and his deputy J. D. Byers arrived, they were at first confronted by the Roop County deputy sheriff, who held in his hand an injunction restraining them. Byers wasted no time snatching it from him, for which he was arrested (and later set free thanks to the sympathy of a local lawyer and the negligence of the judge, who had failed to sign the warrant). In the end, Pierce and Byers were both successful in their arrests and on their way out of town. However, Byers was late to depart, allowing former Governor Isaac Roop to overtake him. Neither was particularly pleased with the sight of the other and they almost reached a shooting point when Francis Langiar, owner of the property, said (or so he claimed), "Gentlemen, remember that you are both Masons." With this, Roop allowed Byers up the road, but not long later he was back with seven armed men to capture the deputy (prisoner still in tow) and haul them back to town.

Upon hearing the news, Pierce released his prisoner and headed over the summit through the snow and into the American and Indian Valleys where he recruited 93 and 15 men, respectively (though accounts differ on the exact numbers), with which he would return. When he and his men returned to Susanville on Sunday the 14th, they found Roop and 30 men (Pierce falsely believed there to be 100) holed up with 600 shots in an old log house (built by Roop in 1854 to fend off Native Americans) known as Fort Defiance.

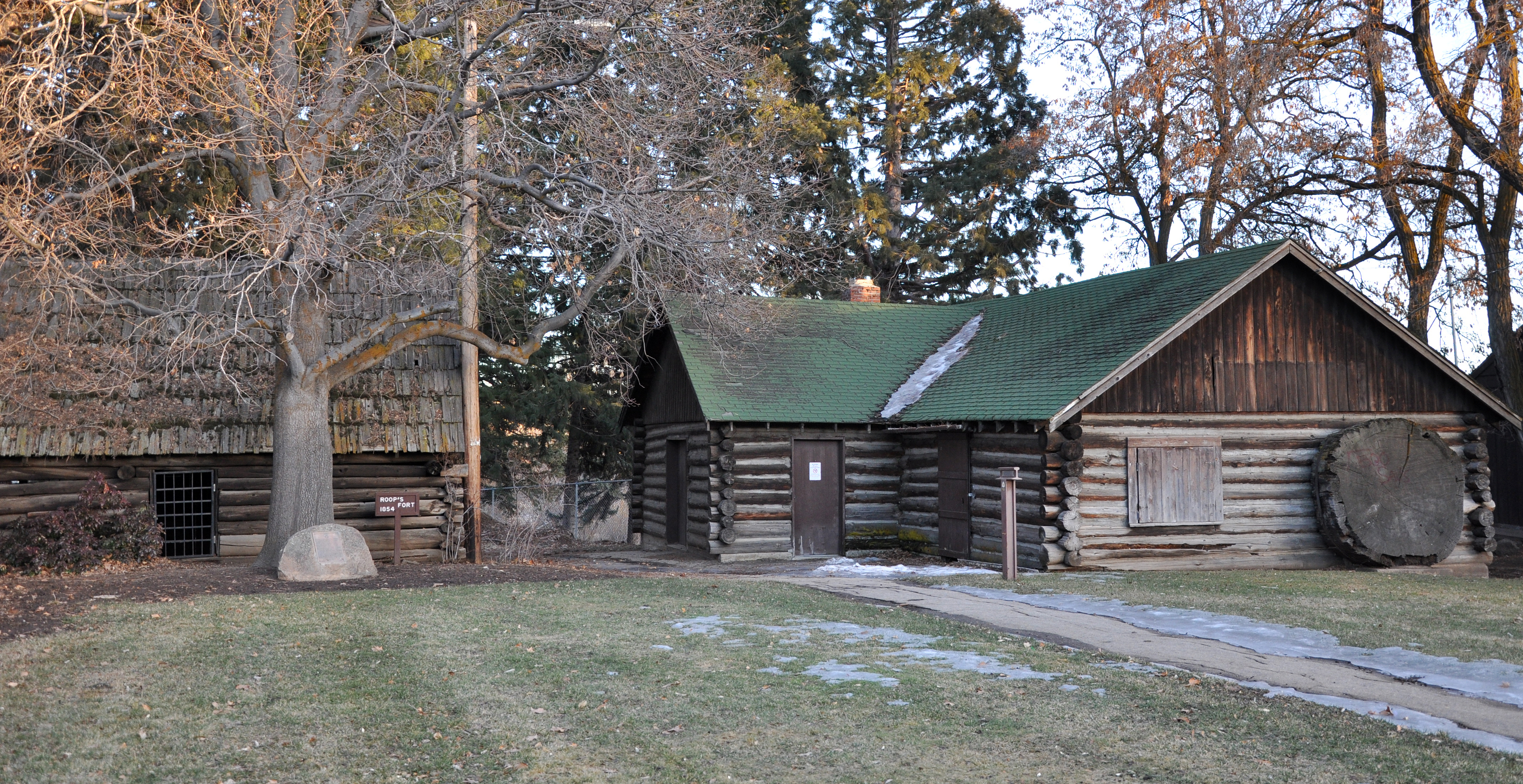
Roop's Fort

== Battle ==
Despite warnings from the Honey Lakers that they would be fired upon, the Plumas company began fortifying a barn 150 to 200 yards away with the knowledge that 20 more men were on their way (with a cannon, they later found out).

The first shot was fired when Plumas Deputy Sheriff Kellogg and four men left the barn to retrieve a log for reinforcement of the barn. Still not heeding the warnings of the Honey Lakers, one of the men, William Bradford, was hit in the thigh before Kellogg was fired upon five more times trying to rescue him. This set off a four-hour round of volleys back and forth, during which two Honey Lakers were slightly wounded. However, it was evident, according to witnesses, that neither side actually wished to inflict injury. This episode lasted until citizens of the town arrived with a white flag in an effort to negotiate a truce.

== Aftermath ==
An armistice was hammered out, which led to a long-term agreement between Sheriffs Pierce and Naileigh. A committee composed of two citizens from each party would be sent to Governors Leland Stanford and Orion Clemens to make their case. In the meantime, neither county would take jurisdiction over the area. There were no ill-feelings between the men themselves as evidenced by their gathering together at the local hotel.

Later on, the settlement as well as the valley up to the easternmost point of the lake was to be, for the time, was put under Plumas County's control in accordance with De Groote's earlier map. Two surveyors, meanwhile, ran the eastern boundary anew from Lake Tahoe to Oregon, finding all of the settlement and the lake within the limits of California and shrinking Roop County so much so that neighboring Washoe County was forced to annex it.

To resolve any hard feelings that some of the area's residents, who were not keen on the quasi-annexation into California, the legislature created Lassen County in 1864 with Susanville as its county seat.
