= Soldier's Bridge, California =

Coordinates: 40.3725°N 120.3910°W

Soldier's Bridge is a former settlement in Lassen County, California, United States, located 16 miles (26 km) southeast of Susanville.

In the summer of 1860, First Lieutenant Hamilton from the San Francisco Presidio and fifty men built a bridge a quarter of a mile below what was then called the Tanner's Lane, hence the name. Soldier's Bridge was on the Nobles Emigrant Trail.

John Pine operated a store and post office at Soldier's Bridge from 1864 to 1867. The store and post office closed when Pine declared bankruptcy.
