= Nobles Emigrant Trail =

- U.S. National Register of Historic Places
- U.S. Historic district
- California Historical Landmark
- California Historical Landmark
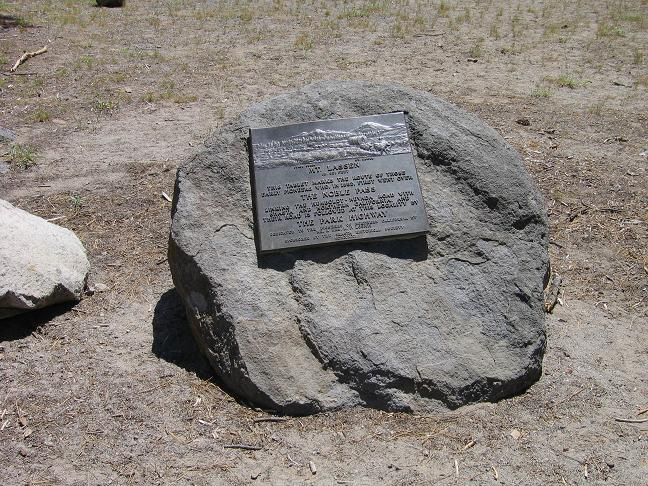
- Plaque marking the site of the Nobles Emigrant Trail in Lassen Volcanic National Park

- Location within California Location within the United States
- Nearest city: Shingletown, California
- Coordinates: 40°32′50″N 121°25′29″W
- Area: 582 acres (236 ha)
- NRHP reference No.: 75000222
- CHISL No.: 675
- CHISL No.: 677
- Added to NRHP: October 3, 1975

The Nobles Emigrant Trail, also known as the Fort Kearney, South Pass and Honey Lake Wagon Road, is a trail in California that was used by emigrant parties from the east as a shortened route to northern California. It was pioneered in 1851 by William Nobles, who discovered an easy shortcut between the Applegate Trail in Nevada and the Lassen Trail in California. The trail was extensively used until the 1870s, when it was superseded by railroads.

== Discovery and establishment ==
The main trail to California in the 1840s was the California Trail, which followed the Humboldt River in Nevada, then the Truckee River, and over the Donner Pass in California. A northern variation was pioneered by the Applegate brothers in 1846, using a more northerly route that connected with destinations in Oregon. Peter Lassen established a variant route that passed Lassen Peak on the way to the Sacramento area. Lassen scouted the area of Honey Lake with William H. Nobles for a legendary "Gold Lake", but having failed, they parted company, with Nobles continuing to the east and accidentally scouting a shorter, easier trail than Lassen's.

Nobles, born in New York in 1816, had moved to Minnesota in 1841 to work as a carpenter, then as a carpenter and wagon-maker. By 1851 he had moved on to California. When Nobles returned to California from his expedition with Lassen, he showed a party of businessmen the route for a fee of $2000. With the subscribers vouching for the usefulness of the 300-mile (480 km) route, he returned to Minnesota in 1853 to promote the route, marrying in Illinois along the way. The Minnesota legislature commissioned Nobles to present the route to Congress in Washington. Nobles' efforts persuaded Congress to appropriate $300,000 for an expedition along the route, led by Frederick W. Lander, who prepared a favorable report in February 1861. The route became known as the Fort Kearney, South Pass and Honey Lake Wagon Road. Nobles was elected to the Minnesota Territorial Legislature and died in St. Paul in 1876. The trail was briefly considered for a railroad route. Its popularity contributed to the founding of Susanville and Redding.

== Historic designation ==
The 24-mile (39 km) section of trail within the boundaries of Lassen Volcanic National Park was placed on the National Register of Historic Places on October 3, 1975. The section within the park is maintained as a hiking trail.

The trail has two California Historical Landmark markers: #675 marks a stopping place along the Noble Emigrant Trail that William Nobles established near the present-day city of Susanville, while #677 marks the spot where Peter Lassen first saw Honey Lake on October 4, 1850, while on his search for "Gold Lake".

== Lassen Volcanic National Park ==
The trail within the park starts in the northeast corner, passing the edge of the Cinder Cone and the Fantastic Lava Beds, then skirting Prospect Peak. Crossing Badger Flats and passing through the Devastated Area associated with the May 21, 1915 eruption of Lassen Peak. The trail parallels the Lassen Park Road, then passes between the Chaos Crags and Table Mountain, across Sunflower Flat and over Nobles Pass, following the edge of the Chaos Jumbles. The trail leaves the northwest corner of the park near Manzanita Lake.

== See also ==
- California Historical Landmarks in Lassen County
