= Lassen, California =

Lassen, California may refer to:

- Lassen, California, former name of Janesville, California
- Lassen County, California
