= DeWitt General Hospital =

US WWII army base in California

- Location within California
- 38°56′23″N 121°06′09″W
- Location: Auburn, California

History
- Built: Open February 17, 1944 (closed December 31, 1945)

Site notes
- Area: 284 acres (115 ha)
- Architect(s): US Army - York and Sawyer

DeWitt General Hospital was a World War II US Army hospital in Auburn, California, in Placer County at the corner of C Avenue and First Street. The hospital was built in 1944 to care for troops returning home from overseas service and troops that served on the home front. The first patient checked in on February 17, 1944. The hospital had 2,285 beds housed in single story buildings over the 284 acres campus. DeWitt General Hospital was three miles north of downtown Auburn.

== DeWitt General Hospital ==
For a short time when it opened, DeWitt General Hospital was called Auburn General Hospital, but was renamed DeWitt General Hospital. The hospital was named after Brigadier General Calvin DeWitt (1840-1908) with the Civil War Medical Corps. The War Department approved the construction of the hospital on 25 March 1943. The land was farm land and fruit trees at the time. The 80 one-story buildings were made of brick and some stucco. The hospital also had a chapel, rehabilitation pool, gymnasium, fire station, kitchen, movie theater and power plant. The Army hospital provided general medicine for returning veterans. In addition to treating troops from overseas, the hospital also received troops from nearby army bases: Camp Beale, Camp Kohler, McClellan Field, and the Sierra Army Depot. Some of the troops treated were from: Reno Army Air Base, Chico Army Air Field, and McClellan Field. At its peak on August 30, 1945, the hospital had 2,310 patients. After the war the US Army closed the hospital on December 31, 1945. There were requests to turn DeWitt General Hospital into a Veteran's Administration hospital, but this was rejected. On March 31, 1946, War Assets Administration sold the hospital to the state of California on conditions. The conditions: the hospital was to be used as a mental institution, not sold for 25 years without Army approval, hospital reporting conditions and conditions if the state failed.

== Camp Flint ==
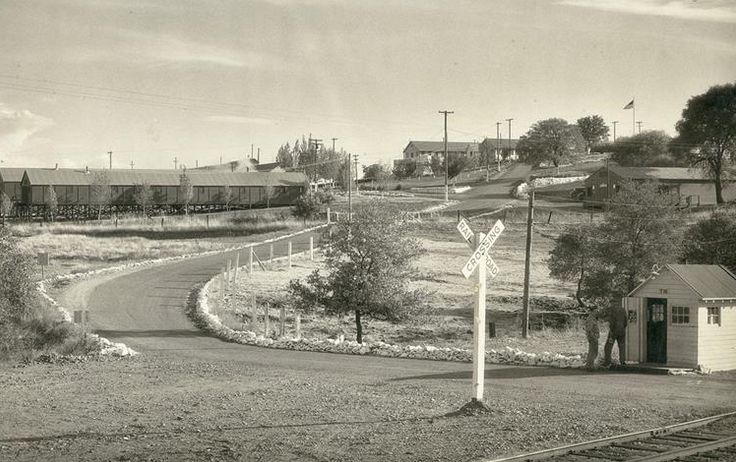
Camp Flint in 1943

Near DeWitt General Hospital, a prisoner of war camp was built, called Camp Flint. Camp Flint held German POWs, at it peak the camp held up to 500 prisoners. Camp Camp Flint was built in 1938 as a Great Depression labor camp for unemployed men. Camp Flint was a depression Federal and State of California public works project. The unemployed men lived in wood and canvas huts. In January 1942 the US Army took over Camp Flint and stationed the 32nd Infantry Division and then the 754th Military Police Battalion to guard the Southern Pacific Railroad tunnels and bridges against potential saboteurs. To support DeWitt General Hospital, 200 German Prisoners of War were transferred to Camp Flint from Florence, Arizona, in June 1945. The camp closed in 1946. On the fairgrounds is the Gold Country Museum, a Works Progress Administration–Camp Flint building.

- Marker at the site reads: At the onset of World War II the U.S. Army's Western Defense Command and Fourth Army sought to secure the strategically important railroad through the Sierra Nevada Mountains. On December 9th 1941, soldiers of the 32nd Infantry Division arrived here in Auburn at "Camp Flint", a base of operations for providing static defense of the railroad's vulnerable infrastructure. In February 1942, the 754th Military Police Battalion arrived at Camp Flint and assumed the railroad security duties of the 32nd Infantry Division who departed in March of 1942. 200 German Prisoners of War were transferred to Camp Flint from Florence, Arizona to provide support at DeWitt General Hospital in June 1945. There were more than 500 POWs when the camp was at its peak. Additional security fencing and guard towers were added to the site to secure the POW camp. Although the hospital was closed in December of 1945, German Prisoners remained at Camp Flint through February of 1946. Erected 2012 by Lord Sholto Douglas Chapter #3 E Clampus Vitus.

== DeWitt State Hospital ==
The first patients transferred to the DeWitt State Hospital in 1947 from other State Hospitals. DeWitt State Hospital began checking in patients from local counties in July 1950. DeWitt State Hospital served the counties of Placer, Modoc, Lassen, Sierra, Yuba, Sutter, and El Dorado. In 1960 DeWitt State Hospital had 2,800 patients at its peak. In 1972 DeWitt State Hospital closed, having serviced its 25-year agreement. On 1 April 1972 the hospital was transferred to the County of Placer.

== County of Placer government ==
The hospital was converted to the Placer county government service center. Today it houses the Placer County Jail, Placer County Juvenile Detention Facility, Adult System of Care services, Human services, Vital Statistics and Community Health. Part of the hospital is used for professional services, residential, commercial, farm's market and Skyline Church. About 30% of the 80 original buildings have been removed.

== See also ==
- California during World War II
- American Theater (1939–1945)
- Desert Training Center
- United States home front during World War II
- Veterans Health Administration
