= Rancho Bosquejo =

Mexican land grant in present-day Tehama County, California

Coordinates: 39.890°N 122.030°W

Rancho Bosquejo (also called Lassen's Rancho) was a 22,206-acre (89.86 km^{2}) Mexican land grant in present-day Tehama County, California given in 1844 by Governor Manuel Micheltorena to Peter Lassen. The name means "Wooded Ranch" in Spanish. The grant extended along the east bank of the Sacramento River south of Rancho Rio de los Molinos and Toomes Creek, and encompassed present day Vina on Deer Creek.

== History ==
Peter Lassen (1800–1859) was born in Denmark, and immigrated to the United States in 1829. Ten years later he traveled to Oregon, and by 1840 he had made his way to California, where he worked for John Sutter. After becoming a Mexican citizen in 1844, Lassen's five square league land grant, Rancho Bosquejo, was approved. Lassen built a home on his land, and had livestock and planted crops by late 1845. In 1845, Lassen invited William B. Ide to come to his ranch and build a sawmill. Shortly later, after a misunderstanding, Ide moved north to Rancho Barranca Colorado.

On the north side of Deer Creek, in 1845, Lassen laid out a townsite, calling it "Benton City", in honor of Senator Thomas Benton of Missouri, whose daughter, Jessie Benton, married General John C. Frémont. Frémont and some of his men visited Lassen's ranch in 1846.

In 1847 Lassen, as a part of Commodore Robert F. Stockton's party, returned to Missouri, in hope of encouraging emigrants to settle at Benton City. Prior to his 1847 departure, Lassen deeded over the land he owned north of Deer Creek (one-fifth of his ranch) to his ranch manager Daniel Sill. In 1848, Lassen brought back a small group of emigrants from Missouri over the Lassen Trail; also bringing with him the first Masonic charter into California. When Lassen arrived back at Benton City he found it nearly vacated, the settlers having left to join the Gold Rush.

Seeking to profit from the gold rush, in 1850, Lassen sold two-thirds of his land to partners General John Wilson and Joel Palmer. Palmer never performed, and Wilson transferred Palmer's share to Charles L. Wilson. Lassen, leaving the other third in the care of others, went to San Francisco to purchase a stern-wheel steamboat, the "Lady Washington". The trip from Sacramento to the mouth of Deer Creek, took the "Lady Washington" about five months to complete. The boat encountered numerous problems with sand bars and snag trees on the Sacramento River and was sunk.

While Lassen was on the river to Deer Creek, his cattle were stolen. Wilson and Palmer to whom he sold part of his ranch had not paid him. With the sinking of the "Lady Washington", the departure of settlers for the gold mines, and other financial problems, Lassen was forced to sell his remaining one-third interest in the rancho together with his claim against Wilson and Palmer to Henry Gerke in 1852. Lassen had become convinced of the existence of Gold Lake and he organized an expedition to find it. Lassen was killed in 1859 under strange circumstances near what is now Clapper Creek in the Black Rock Range in Nevada.

With the cession of California to the United States following the Mexican-American War, the 1848 Treaty of Guadalupe Hidalgo provided that the land grants would be honored. As required by the Land Act of 1851, a claim for Rancho Bosquejo was filed with the Public Land Commission in 1852, and the grant was patented to Peter Lassen in 1862.

A claim filed by Harriet Sill Besse (1828–1887) with the Land Commission in 1853 was rejected.

Henry Gerke (1810–1882), a German immigrant and a prominent San Francisco businessman, expanded the vineyard and operated a successful wine and brandy business. Gerke sold Rancho Bosquejo to Leland Stanford in 1881. Stanford created the Vina Ranch with the world’s largest vineyard and winery among other enterprises. The vineyards eventually covered 3,575 acres (14 km^{2}), but in the intemperate climate the vines provided poor wine, and brandy became the principal product. Stanford died in 1893 and the property was deeded to Stanford University, which sold it off piecemeal, with the final 200 acres (1 km^{2}) selling in 1919. The Abbey of New Clairvaux, a Trappist monastery, now occupies remnants of the homestead.
