= KAHC =

KAHC may refer to:

- KAHC-LD, a low-power television station (channel 30, virtual 43) licensed to serve Sacramento, California, United States
- KCFL-LP, a low-power radio station (105.1 FM) licensed to serve Aberdeen, Washington, United States, which held the call sign KAHC-LP in 2015
- Amedee Army Airfield (ICAO code KAHC)
