= Peter Lassen =

Danish-American rancher and prospector (1800–1859)

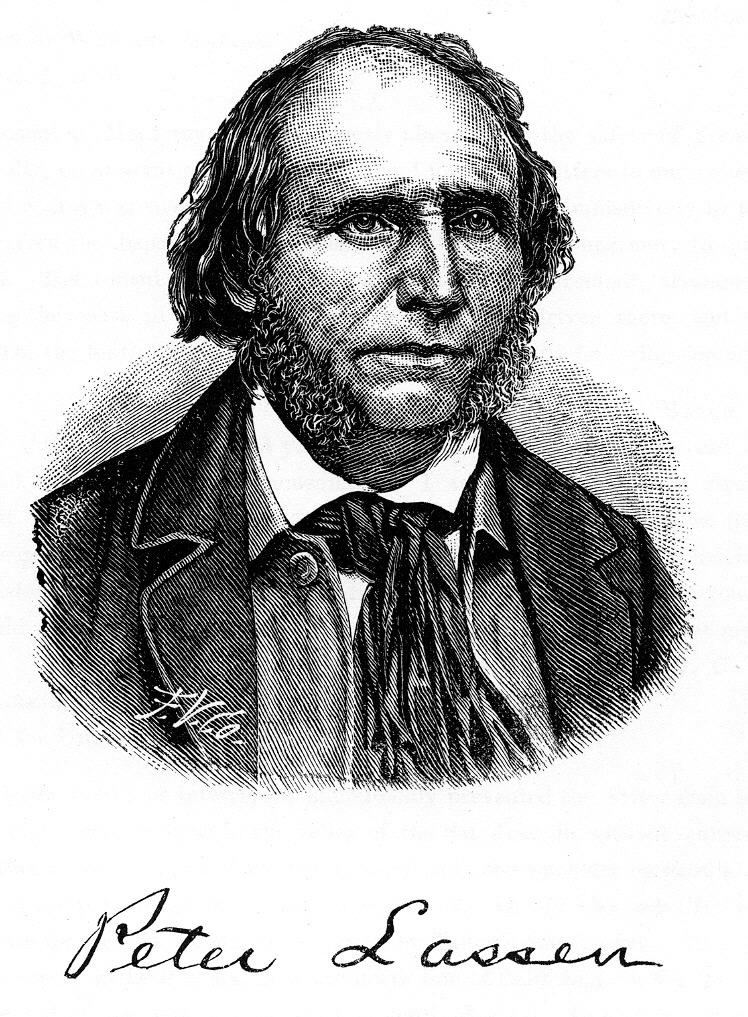
- Peter Lassen-portrait and signature, published 1882.
- Born: October 31, 1800; Farum, Denmark–Norway
- Died: April 26, 1859 (aged 58); Black Rock Desert, Utah Territory
- Other names: Don Pedro Lassen, Peter Larsen Farum

Peter Lassen (October 31, 1800 – April 26, 1859), later known in Spanish as Don Pedro Lassen, was a Danish-born Californian ranchero and gold prospector. Born in Denmark, Lassen immigrated at age 30 to Massachusetts, before eventually moving to Alta California (then a part of Mexico). In California, Lassen became a Mexican citizen and received the vast Rancho Bosquejo from Governor Manuel Micheltorena. He is the namesake of Lassen County, California, Lassen Peak, Lassen National Forest, and Lassen Volcanic National Park.

== Early life ==
Peter Lassen was born in Farum, Denmark, and immigrated in 1830 to Boston, Massachusetts. Born to Johanne Sophie Westergaard and Lars Nielsen, Peter was baptized on December 7, 1800. The patronymic surname Larsen, meaning "son of Lars", was applied in his naming and was common among Danish farmers at that time. Lassen used several different variants of his surname while living in Copenhagen, sometimes preferring to be called Peter Larsen Farum, after his birthplace.

When he was seventeen, Lassen moved to Kalundborg to learn blacksmithing. He apprenticed under his uncle, Christian Nielsen, until 1823, when he moved to Copenhagen to work under a master blacksmith named Sigersted.

== Pioneering California ==
In 1840, Lassen immigrated to California. He traveled from Keytesville, Missouri, to Westport, Missouri, a "common place of rendezvous for overland parties". The expedition Lassen joined was made up of missionaries and adventurers, some on their way to California; others were headed to the Columbia River basin in Oregon.

Lassen then met the ship Lausanne on the Willamette River in Oregon. He sailed on July 3, 1840, boarding for passage to Bodega Bay, in Sonoma County, California. The travelers landed in California at Fort Ross, and stayed on there until they could procure some horses to travel to Sutter's Fort.

Lassen arrived at Sutter's Fort in August 1840, alongside William Wiggins, who had traveled with him from Westport (now Kansas City, Missouri), over land and by sea for nearly fifteen months starting in May 1839. John Sutter welcomed the men and traveled with them from his colony, known at the time as New Helvetia (meaning New Switzerland), to Yerba Buena and Alviso, California, in a small sailboat.

While it is likely he was working as a blacksmith during his early years in California, Lassen traveled to Santa Cruz in 1841, where he oversaw the construction of a sawmill owned by Isaac Graham on Zayante Creek. Lassen was paid 100 mules for his efforts. In the winter of 1840–1841, Lassen returned to San Jose with another pioneer blacksmith, William "Guillermo" Gulnac; the two traveled to the upper San Joaquin Valley in the spring of 1841. In July 1842, the men arrived at Rancho Campo de los Franceses but just missed connecting with French-Canadian trappers who worked for the Hudson's Bay Company. Lassen pushed on with his livestock, and instead spent the next few years camped in a hut along the Cosumnes River, working as a traveling blacksmith.

== Lassen Emigrant Trail ==
In 1848, Lassen established the Lassen Cutoff, a variation on the California Trail which left the main trail near the present-day Rye Patch Reservoir and crossed a desolate section of what is now northwestern Nevada, including the Black Rock Desert. His cutoff continued to Goose Lake in northeastern California and then followed the Pit River into California's Central Valley. Portions of this trail were particularly arduous, and many of its early travelers greatly regretted choosing it. The route was extensively traveled during the years 1848 to 1853, but because of the hardships of the route, the trail was little used thereafter. The Applegate Trail also traveled from Rye Patch Reservoir to Goose Lake; intended as a safer alternative to the main route of the Oregon Trail, it continued into Oregon's Willamette Valley. The Lassen Cutoff is marked by two California Historical Landmarks, Nos. 763 and 678.

Historian John D. Unruh, Jr., writes that during Lassen's first attempt at using his cutoff, he was rescued from disaster by a group of well-supplied emigrants from Oregon who helped him reach his ranch:

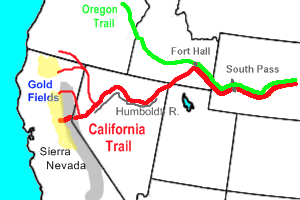
California Trail (thick red line), including the Lassen Cutoff (middle thin red line)

Here the wily Dane orchestrated a meeting wherein the emigrants supposedly endorsed him as a guide and warmly praised his cutoffs. This deceptive endorsement was rushed eastward to be printed in newspapers and influence credulous forty-niners hell-bent for the gold fields. Planning carefully, Lassen also dispatched agents to divert forty-niners onto the cutoff and to set up trail advertisements (including a signboard at Lassen Meadows, where the Applegate Trail branched off from the Humboldt River) with the reassuring message that the diggings were a mere 110 miles ahead ... [A later] emigration trustingly followed their lead, many foolishly discarding surplus provisions on the assumption that only 110 miles remained. The suffering of those choosing the Lassen Cutoff was severe, for it proved to be some 200 miles longer than either the Carson or Truckee routes.

== Rancher ==
In 1844, Lassen was granted the 22,206-acre (8,986 ha) Rancho Bosquejo Mexican land grant in Tehama County by Governor Manuel Micheltorena. On his fourth expedition to the west, John C. Frémont recorded in his journal that in the spring of 1846 he visited and stayed at the Lassen ranch. Frémont noted that Lassen had cultivated wheat, grapes and cotton. In 1855 Lassen moved to the Honey Lake region, where he prospected and served in the office of surveyor of the unofficial Nataqua Territory.

== Death ==
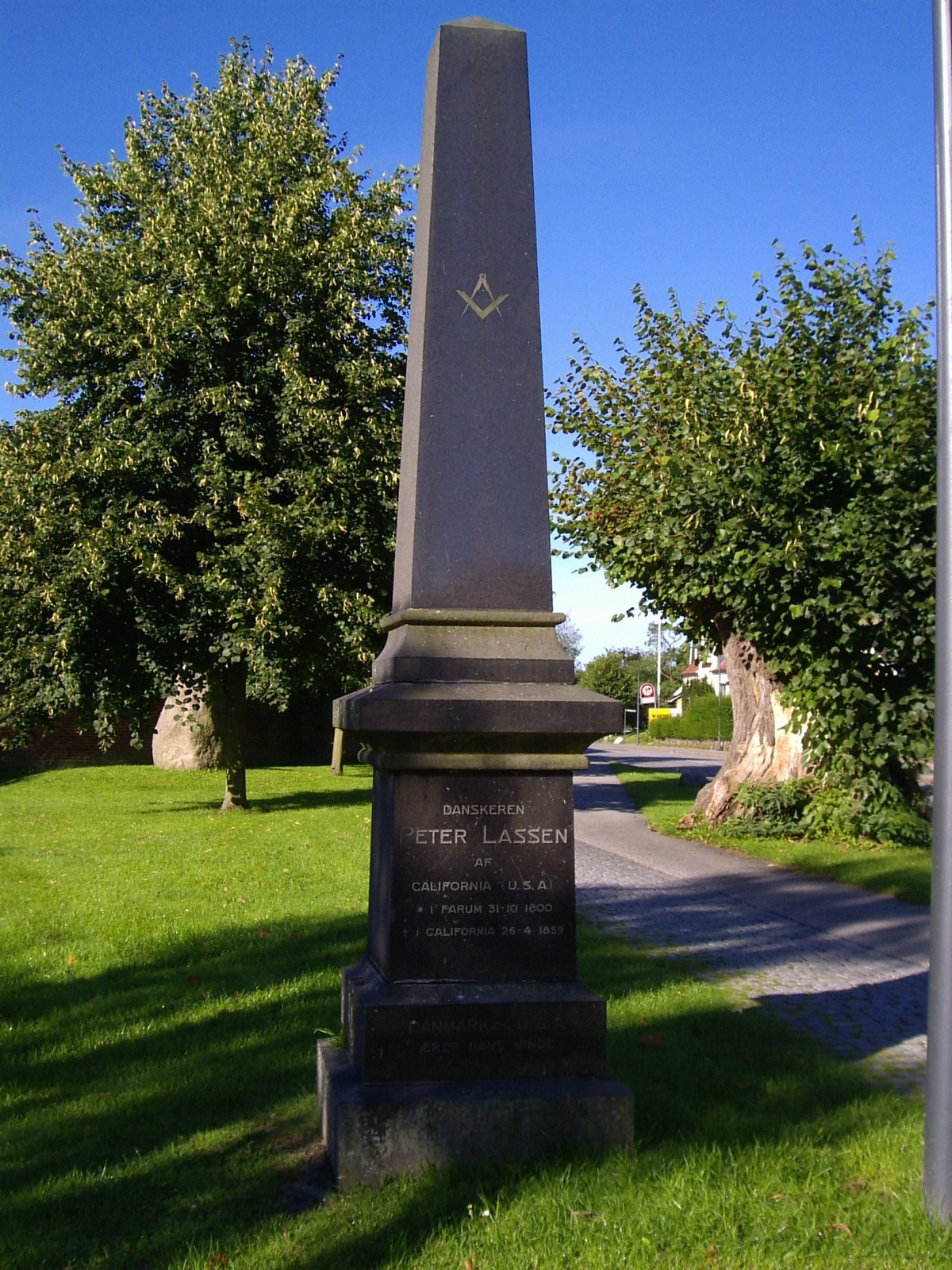
Peter Lassen memorial near his birthplace in Farum, Denmark

Lassen was murdered on April 26, 1859, just south of present-day Clapper Creek (near what was then known as Black Rock Canyon) in the Black Rock Range as he was traveling in the area (later known as Hardin City, Nevada) to prospect for silver. He was traveling with Edward Clapper and Americus Wyatt; Clapper was killed in the same incident, but Wyatt escaped. The circumstances surrounding his death remain mysterious. According to Wyatt, Lassen and Clapper were shot by an unseen sniper while breaking camp.

At the time the culprits were widely considered to be Northern Paiute, who were then in a state of unrest which would soon lead to the Paiute War. However, Wyatt himself, Pit River Indians, and disgruntled emigrants who had followed the Lassen Trail have also been suspected. In particular, an investigation at the time disclosed that none of Lassen, Clapper or Wyatt's supplies had been taken. In the perception of the investigator, leaving the supplies was not normal conduct for a Native American raiding party at that time, and, as a result, Wyatt himself has been suspected as the murderer of Lassen and Clapper. William Weatherlow, a Susanville resident, leader of the Honey Lake Rangers, and close friend of Isaac Roop, was in the area and was leading the prospecting party with which Lassen, Clapper, and Wyatt had planned to rendezvous. Weatherlow's group was thought by Indian Agent Major Frederick Dodge to have been the murderers, although Dodge later privately retracted his statement.

Peter Lassen's grave is located south of Susanville in Lassen County, California, along the eastern foothills of the Sierra Nevada. Peter Lassen's Grave at 2550 Wingfield Road, Susanville, California is California Historical Landmark No. 565.

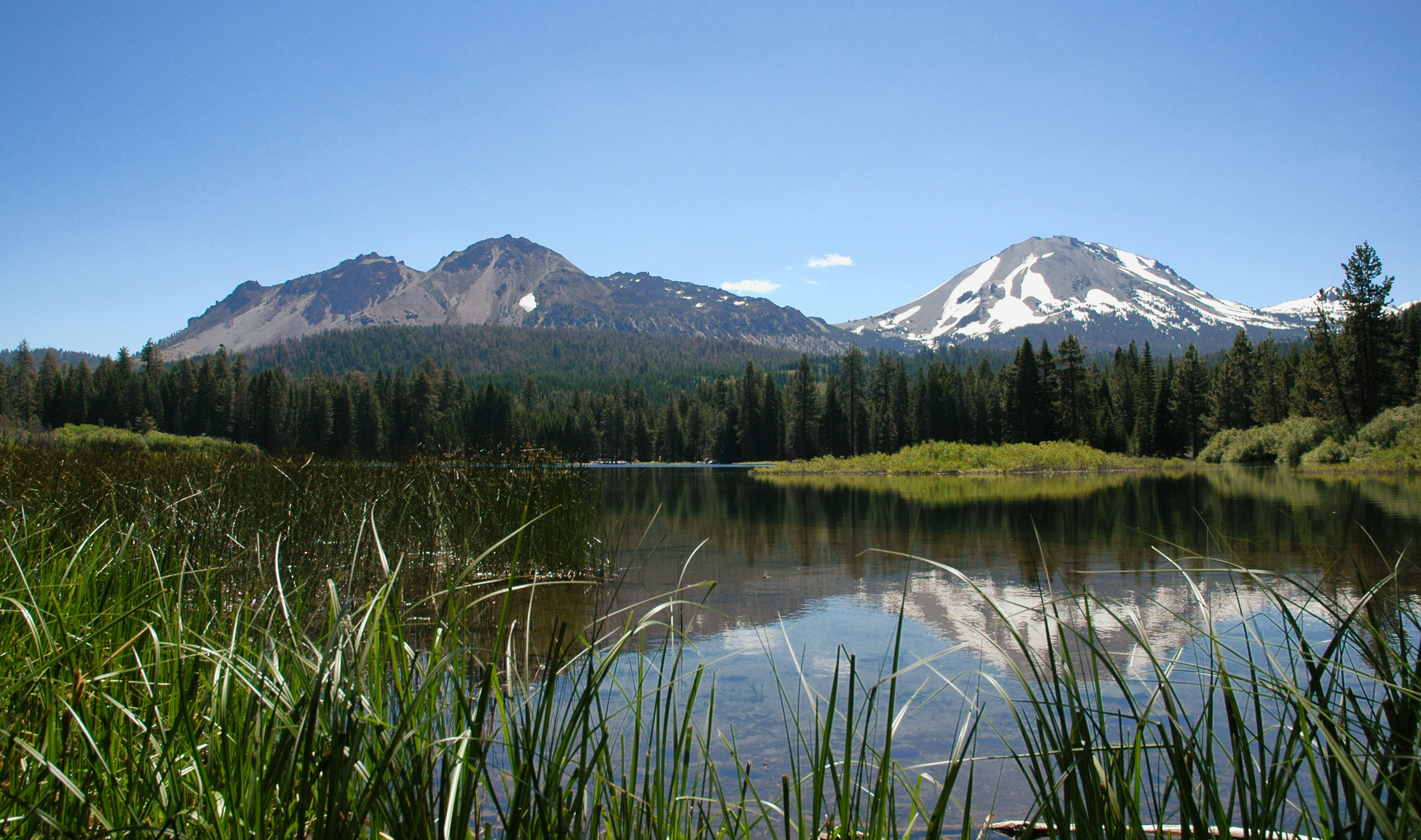
Chaos Crags and snowy Lassen Peak, Lassen Volcanic National Park, California

== Legacy ==
Lassen County, Lassen Peak,, Lassen National Forest, Lassen Volcanic National Park, and Banner Lassen Medical Center and Lassen College in Susanville are all named in Lassen's honor. In addition there is a Scout troop in his hometown of Farum called Peter Lassen Troop.

== In popular culture ==
Michael Witney portrayed Lassen in the 1968 episode "The Other Side of the Mountain" of the television anthology series Death Valley Days, hosted by Robert Taylor.

== See also ==
- California Historical Landmarks in Lassen County
