= Camp Kohler =

Coordinates: 38.674042°N 121.366481°W

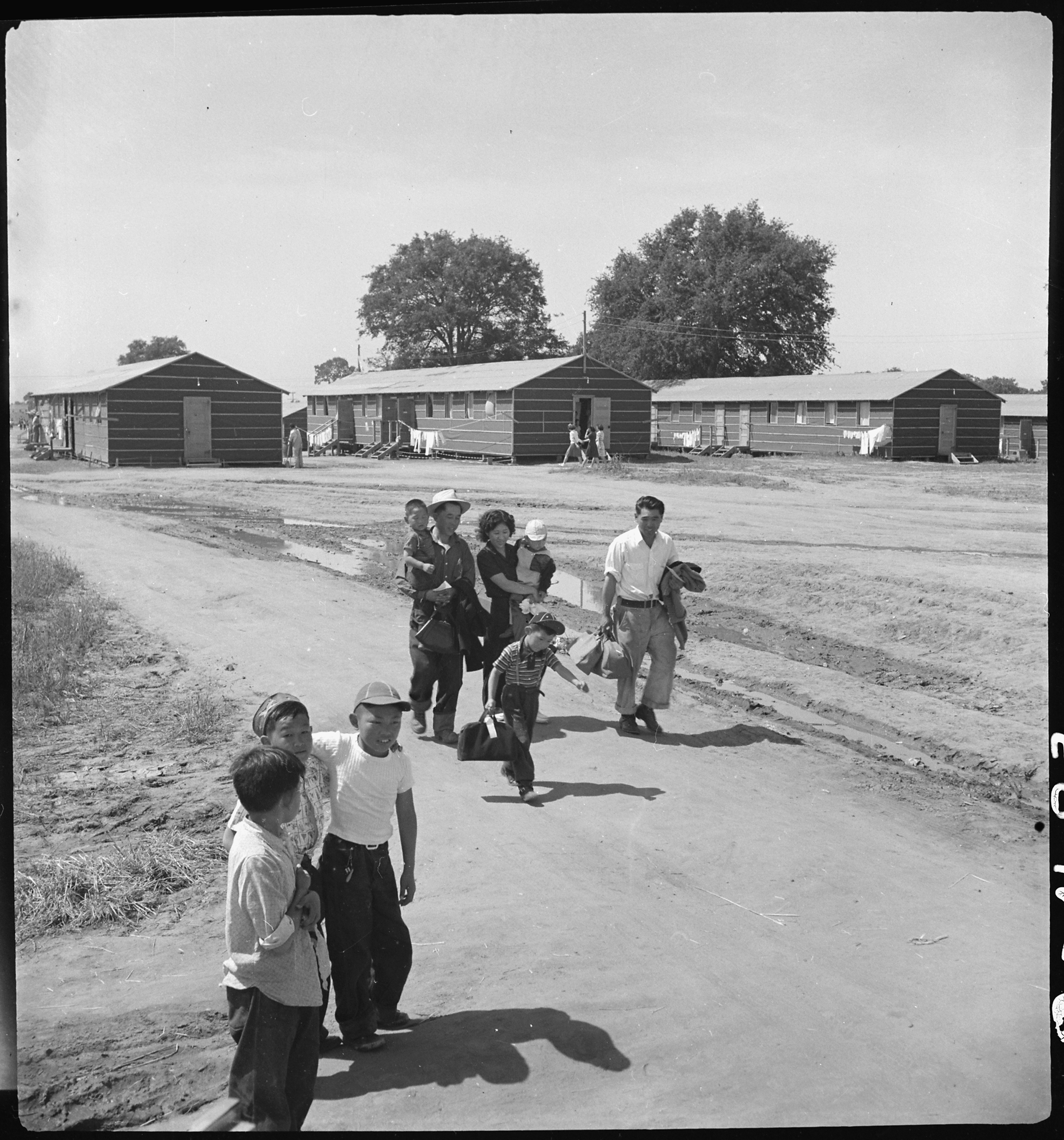
Interned Japanese-American family arriving at the Sacramento Assembly Center (May 20, 1942)

Camp Kohler was located in the northeast corner of unincorporated Sacramento County, California, United States, until it was destroyed by a fire in 1947. Initially a camp for migrant farm workers, it became the Sacramento Assembly Center a temporary detention center for interned Japanese Americans in 1942. The site is one of 12 California assembly centers that share designation as California Historical Landmark No. 934. From 1943 to 1945 the camp was a training center for US World War II forces.

== History ==
Camp Kohler had many uses throughout its existence. It began as a migrant farm worker camp and was later used to house over 4,700 Japanese Americans who had been removed from the West Coast during World War II. One of 15 temporary detention sites known as "assembly centers" and run by the Wartime Civilian Control Administration, the Sacramento site, called the Sacramento Assembly Center, confined Japanese Americans from Sacramento and San Joaquin Counties while they waited to be transferred to a more permanent and isolated War Relocation Authority camp. Also known as the Walerga Assembly Center, it was one of the smaller WCCA camps and operated for 52 days, from May 6 to June 26, 1942.

Upon closure of the assembly center, the site was turned over to the Army Signal Corps and dedicated as Camp Kohler Training Camp. Camp Kohler also served as the Walerga Engineer Depot during the war. At the camp there was: housing for 5,000, training maneuvers, field training, swimming pool, five obstacle courses, hospital, and a small arms practice range on the 3,014 acres. A Southern Pacific Railroad line supported the camp. The camp closed in December 1946. On June 20, 1947, a fire burned many of the wood buildings remaining.

After the war, returning Japanese Americans, prevented from owning their pre-war homes by discriminatory legislation and faced with a severe housing shortage, were often unable to find housing, and 234 families temporarily lived at Camp Kohler in late 1945.

Today, the former Signal Corps camp site is part of a residential subdivision just outside the city of Sacramento, in a community called Foothill Farms. There is a sign on Roseville Road that reads Camp Kohler, 5922 Roseville Rd, Gate 201. It is next to a fenced area that has a building and a tower with a rotating antenna. There also appear to be remnants of the camp in Walerga Park at the northwest corner of Palm Avenue and College Oak Drive, where there is a plaque commemorating California Historical Landmark #934, Temporary Detention Camps for Japanese Americans-Sacramento Assembly Center.

== See also ==
- American Theater (1939–1945)
- Desert Training Center
- Military history of the United States during World War II
- United States home front during World War II
- DeWitt General Hospital
