= Sherman, Nevada =

Unincorporated community in Nevada, US

- Ghost Town
- Location within the state of Nevada Sherman (the United States)
- Coordinates: 40°07′53″N 115°39′49″W
- Country: United States
- State: Nevada
- County: Elko
- Elevation: 6,454 ft (1,967 m)
- Time zone: UTC-8 (Pacific (PST))
  - Summer (DST): UTC-7 (PDT)
- GNIS feature ID: 862785

Sherman is an unincorporated community semi ghost town in Elko County, Nevada in the United States.

== History ==
The history of Sherman is linked with Valentine Walter family's history. Valentine and his wife came from Eureka and had homesteaded in Sherman Creek by 1876. The couple had twelve children. Because he had so many children, Walter had the permission to open and to create his own school district on May 9, 1886. Sherma was a stagecoach stop. The Walthers provided food and lodging. Walther had the finest grove in Nevada at that time. In this orchard he raised cherries, plums, apricots, apples (250 apple trees). Unhappily, Mrs Walther died in June 1895 and Valentine was left alone to raise 11 children (one child had died at two months of age). In 1902, he and a friend began to build a huge nine-room log home which took 2 years to finish. In 1922, Walther sold his ranch and retired to Elko, where he died in 1933. Nowadays, Sherman is a private property behind a gate and should not be entered without permission, but many of the buildings of early times remain, such as a blacksmith shop and the school.
