= California Historical Landmarks in Lassen County =

This list includes properties and districts listed on the California Historical Landmark listing in Lassen County, California. Click the "Map of all coordinates" link to the right to view a Google map of all properties and districts with latitude and longitude coordinates in the table below.

Image		Landmark name	Location	City or town	Summary
Upload Photo	758	Fort Janesville	North of Janesville Elementary School; 40°18′N 120°32′W	Janesville	
Lassen Emigrant Trail	678	Lassen Emigrant Trail	Hwy 36; 40°18′52″N 121°03′21″W	Westwood	
Lassen Emigrant Trail, Bieber	763	Lassen Emigrant Trail, Bieber	County of Lassen Library-Historical Museum; 41°07′17″N 121°08′17″W	Bieber	
Noble Emigrant Trail	677	Noble Emigrant Trail	State Hwy 395; 40°25′07″N 120°17′05″W	Litchfield	Also on the NRHP list as NPS-75000222
Noble Emigrant Trail, Susanville	675	Noble Emigrant Trail, Susanville	Lassen Memorial Park; 40°25′08″N 120°39′18″W	Susanville	Also on the NRHP list as NPS-75000222
Peter Lassen's Grave	565	Peter Lassen's Grave	2550 Wingfield Rd. 40°21′04″N 120°38′23″W	Susanville	
Roop's Fort	76	Roop's Fort	Memorial Park, N. Weatherlow & Nevada St. 40°25′08″N 120°39′20″W	Susanville	Also on the NRHP list as NPS-74000516

== See also ==
- National Register of Historic Places listings in Lassen County, California
- List of California Historical Landmarks
