= Amedee Army Airfield =

Amedee Army Airfield Reno Army Air Base Auxiliary Flight Strip
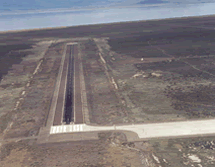
- Aerial photo of runway

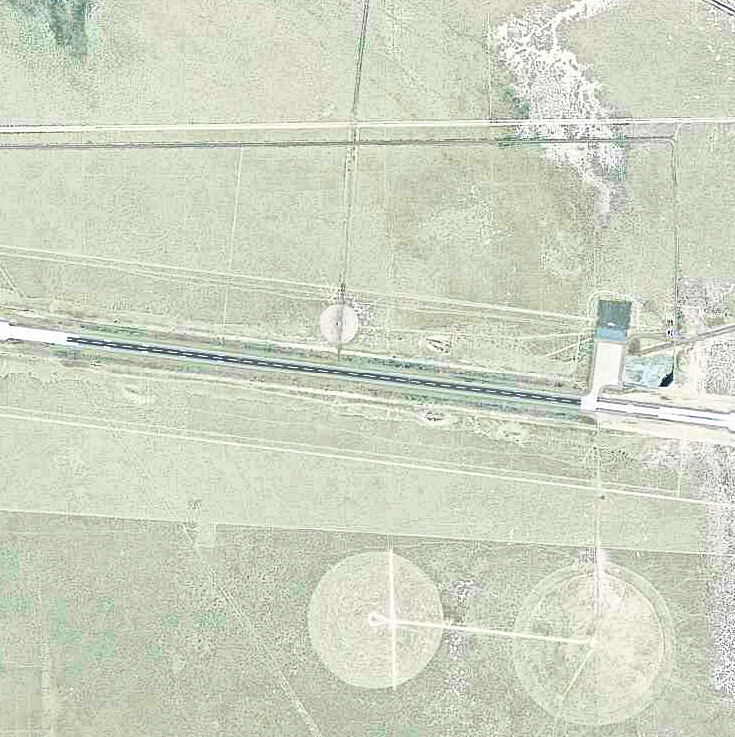
- 2006 USGS airphoto
- IATA: AHC; ICAO: KAHC; FAA LID: AHC

Summary
- Airport type: Military
- Owner: U.S. Army, ATCA-ASO
- Location: Sierra Army Depot, near Herlong, California
- Built: 1942
- Elevation AMSL: 4,012 ft (1,223 m)
- Coordinates: 40°15′57″N 120°09′02″W

Map
- Location of Amedee Army Airfield KAHC (the United States)

Runways
Direction	Length		Surface
Direction	ft	m	Surface
8/26	10,000	3,048	Asphalt
- Source: Federal Aviation Administration

Amedee Army Airfield (IATA: AHC, ICAO: KAHC, FAA LID: AHC) is a military use airport located nine nautical miles (17 km) north of the central business district of Herlong, in Lassen County, California, United States. It is owned by the United States Army and located at the Sierra Army Depot in the Honey Lake Valley, east of the Sierra Nevada mountain range.

== History ==
The airfield was built by the United States Army Air Forces about 1942, and was known as Reno Army Air Base Auxiliary Flight Strip. It was an emergency landing airfield for military aircraft on training flights. After World War II, the airfield was retained by the Army, and is used as part of the Sierra Army Depot. It was also known as Honey Lake Flight Strip.

== Facilities ==
Amedee AAF has one runway designated 8/26 with an asphalt surface measuring 10,000 by 150 feet (3,048 x 46 m).

== See also ==
- California during World War II
- California World War II Army Airfields
