= Vertic =

Marketing agency

- Industry: Digital Marketing & Communications, Digital Transformation, and Design
- Founded: 2002
- Headquarters: New York City
- Number of locations: New York Copenhagen
- Area served: Worldwide
- Key people: CEO, Sebastian Jespersen Company president, Mads Krogh Petersen
- Services: Digital strategy User experience & design systems Insights & analytics ABM & demand generation Digital event & experiences Corporate website & eCommerce Marketing-as-a-service
- Number of employees: 95
- Parent: Globant
- Website: https://www.vertic.com/

Vertic (Vertic A/S) is a global digital agency with offices in New York and Copenhagen. The agency creates digital marketing experiences based on technology, design, and data.

Vertic is the creator of the marketing philosophy Share of Life, which combines strategy, insights, design, and technology. Furthermore, the agency releases an annual Global Corporate Website Index, which ranks 300 corporate websites across 21 industries based on an assessment of usability, relevance and technology use.

== History ==
In 2002, Sebastian Jespersen, CEO, and Mads Krogh Peterson, President, founded Vertic on the principle that digital transformation could help business form a deeper and broader connection with customers, both founders have a background in management.

In January 2023, Globant (NYSE: GLOB), a digitally native company that operates a global network with over 40 offices and more than 9000 employees, acquired Vertic. Vertic has approximately 100 employees in 2 offices located in New York and Copenhagen.

== Initiatives ==
=== Share of Life ===
Share of Life is a marketing platform developed by Sebastian Jespersen, CEO, and Stan Rapp, pioneer of one-to-one marketing and co-founder of Rapp Collins Worldwide agency (RAPP). The methodology proposes that in an age dominated by digital interactions, companies must create deeper relationships with consumers by weaving the brand into their daily life.

=== UN Global Compact ===
Vertic is a member of the UN Global Compact and is the advocate for an 18th UN Sustainable Development Goal (SDG): A Meaningful and Safe Digital Life. The SDG promotes fair practices in an increasingly digital world by encouraging companies to use data for mutual benefit rather than for intrusion or manipulation.

=== The Corporate Website Index ===
Vertic created the Global Corporate Website Index to evaluate and rank the performance of corporate websites. It assesses websites according to 3 sets of criteria: User Experience & Design, Relevancy, and Use of Technology.

== Partnerships ==
=== Forrester ===
Forrester has adopted Vertic’s Share of Life methodology to describe and explore the deep, entangled relationships that brands have with their customers.

== Awards and recognition ==
In 2022, Vertic was recognized by Gartner as one of the key Global Digital Marketing Agencies in their annual market guide.

In 2017, Vertic won four awards for the GE Corporate Website Project, including the ACE AWARDS for best brand website, the DRUMB2B Brave Awards for the best use of data & technology in a website, the Internationalist Award for innovative digital marketing, as well as the Webby Awards for the best navigation structure.
