= Herlong, California =

Herlong
- census-designated place
- Location of Herlong in Lassen County, California.

- Location in California
- Coordinates: 40°08′37″N 120°08′05″W
- Country: United States
- State: California
- County: Lassen

Area
  - Total: 1.668 sq mi (4.320 km^{2})
  - Land: 1.668 sq mi (4.320 km^{2})
  - Water: 0 sq mi (0 km^{2}) 0%
- Elevation: 4,114 ft (1,254 m)

Population (2020)
  - Total: 237
  - Density: 142/sq mi (54.9/km^{2})
- Time zone: UTC-8 (Pacific (PST))
  - Summer (DST): UTC-7 (PDT)
- ZIP Code: 96113
- Area codes: 530, 837
- GNIS feature IDs: 1658740; 2583035

Herlong is a census-designated place in Lassen County, California, United States. Herlong is located at the extreme eastern edge of the Sierra Nevada Mountain Range in the southeastern region of Honey Lake Valley, 8 miles (13 km) north of Doyle, at an elevation of 4,114 feet (1,254 m). Its population is 237 as of the 2020 census, down from 298 from the 2010 census. Herlong is located in southern Lassen County near the southeastern edge of Honey Lake, approximately 70 miles (110 km) north of Reno, Nevada, and about 45 miles (72 km) south of Susanville, the county seat. The community is accessible to U.S. Route 395 via Lassen County Route A25 or Lassen County Route A26.

== History ==
Herlong was developed in 1942 after the attack on Pearl Harbor during World War II, to house civilian workers to support the Sierra Army Depot, one of several ammunition storage facilities located inland in order to be safe from Japanese attack. The site also met the requirement of being a dry and isolated area. The community was named after Captain Henry W. Herlong, the first United States Army ordnance officer to die in World War II. The postal stamps, money orders and equipment bore the spelling "Hurlong", which lasted for about five days; the error was discovered and corrected.

In the 21st century, Sierra Army Depot serves as the Army's End of First Life Center and the CONUS-based Army Prepositioned Stock Site. It continues to provide expeditionary logistics support and long-term sustainment solutions.

Since its beginning, the town has varied in size. Its population peaked at about 5,000 in the 1950s, consisting mostly of civilian employees on the base and their families. As of the 2020 census, the community had 237 people.

Herlong has several churches, including the Bible Baptist Church, Assembly of God, and Southern Baptist. The State Office of Historic Preservation lists 62 historic properties in Herlong on its Historic Properties Data File for Lassen County. This is one of the last counties in California that is still considered to be "open range" land.

== Geography ==
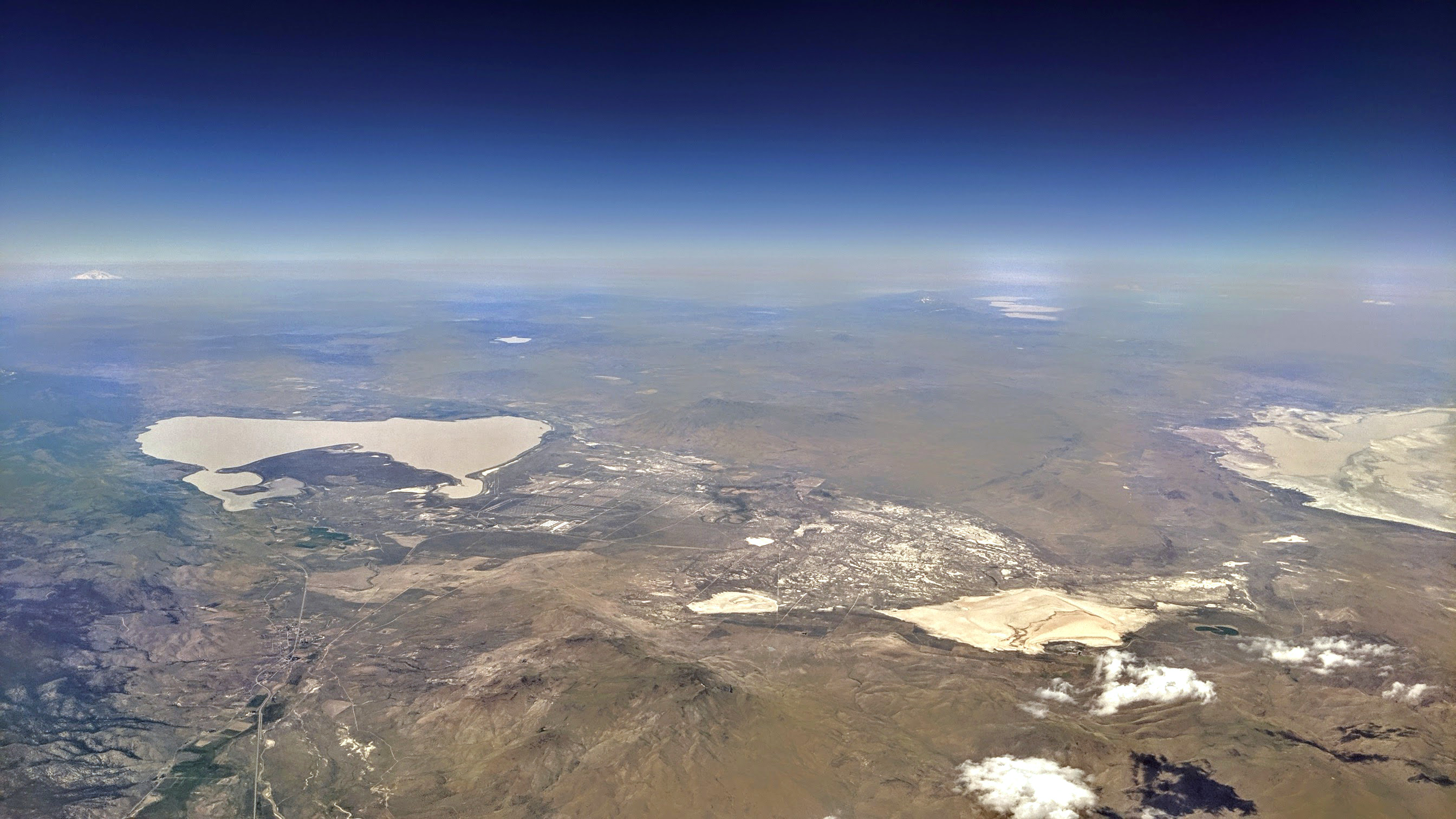
Aerial view of Honey Lake and Herlong and vicinity

According to the United States Census Bureau, the CDP has a total area of 1.7 square miles (4.4 km^{2}), all land.

=== Climate ===
This region experiences warm (but not hot) and dry summers, with no average monthly temperatures above 71.6 °F. According to the Köppen Climate Classification system, Herlong has a warm-summer Mediterranean climate, abbreviated "Csb" on climate maps.

Climate data for Herlong
Month	Jan	Feb	Mar	Apr	May	Jun	Jul	Aug	Sep	Oct	Nov	Dec	Year
Record high °F (°C)	66 (19)	68 (20)	80 (27)	87 (31)	98 (37)	107 (42)	111 (44)	107 (42)	105 (41)	90 (32)	76 (24)	69 (21)	111 (44)
Mean daily maximum °F (°C)	41.7 (5.4)	47.6 (8.7)	56.3 (13.5)	65.1 (18.4)	74 (23)	82.7 (28.2)	93.4 (34.1)	91.6 (33.1)	82.4 (28.0)	69.7 (20.9)	53.9 (12.2)	43.5 (6.4)	66.8 (19.3)
Mean daily minimum °F (°C)	20.1 (−6.6)	24.3 (−4.3)	28 (−2)	32.6 (0.3)	38.3 (3.5)	43.4 (6.3)	48.8 (9.3)	46.4 (8.0)	41.1 (5.1)	33.8 (1.0)	26.1 (−3.3)	21.4 (−5.9)	33.7 (0.9)
Record low °F (°C)	−31 (−35)	−24 (−31)	2 (−17)	7 (−14)	18 (−8)	12 (−11)	28 (−2)	29 (−2)	19 (−7)	8 (−13)	−10 (−23)	−25 (−32)	−31 (−35)
Average precipitation inches (mm)	1.8 (46)	1.4 (36)	1.1 (28)	0.6 (15)	0.6 (15)	0.5 (13)	0.3 (7.6)	0.2 (5.1)	0.4 (10)	0.8 (20)	1.3 (33)	1.8 (46)	10.7 (270)
Average snowfall inches (cm)	5.6 (14)	3.7 (9.4)	3.5 (8.9)	1.8 (4.6)	0.6 (1.5)	0 (0)	0 (0)	0 (0)	0.1 (0.25)	0.2 (0.51)	2 (5.1)	5.1 (13)	22.6 (57)
Average precipitation days	6	6	6	4	4	3	1	1	2	3	5	6	47

== Demographics ==
Historical population
Census	Pop.	Note	%±
2010	298		—
2020	237		−20.5%
U.S. Decennial Census; 2010

Herlong first appeared as a census designated place in the 2010 U.S. census.

=== 2020 ===
The 2020 United States census reported that Herlong had a population of 237. The population density was 142.1 inhabitants per square mile (54.9/km^{2}). The racial makeup of Herlong was 186 (78.5%) White, 18 (7.6%) African American, 15 (6.3%) Native American, 2 (0.8%) Asian, 0 (0.0%) Pacific Islander, 0 (0.0%) from other races, and 16 (6.8%) from two or more races. Hispanic or Latino of any race were 8 persons (3.4%).

The whole population lived in households. There were 112 households, out of which 45 (40.2%) had children under the age of 18 living in them, 30 (26.8%) were married-couple households, 10 (8.9%) were cohabiting couple households, 17 (15.2%) had a female householder with no partner present, and 55 (49.1%) had a male householder with no partner present. 39 households (34.8%) were one person, and 19 (17.0%) were one person aged 65 or older. The average household size was 2.12. There were 65 families (58.0% of all households).

The age distribution was 57 people (24.1%) under the age of 18, 17 people (7.2%) aged 18 to 24, 59 people (24.9%) aged 25 to 44, 60 people (25.3%) aged 45 to 64, and 44 people (18.6%) who were 65 years of age or older. The median age was 40.8 years. For every 100 females, there were 123.6 males.

There were 118 housing units at an average density of 70.7 units per square mile (27.3 units/km^{2}), of which 112 (94.9%) were occupied. Of these, 24 (21.4%) were owner-occupied, and 88 (78.6%) were occupied by renters.

=== 2010 ===
The 2010 United States census reported that Herlong had a population of 298. The population density was 183.0 inhabitants per square mile (70.7/km^{2}). The racial makeup of Herlong was 187 (62.8%) White, 38 (12.8%) African American, 16 (5.4%) Native American, 1 (0.3%) Asian, 3 (1.0%) Pacific Islander, 9 (3.0%) from other races, and 44 (14.8%) from two or more races. Hispanic or Latino of any race were 46 persons (15.4%).

The Census reported that 293 people (98.3% of the population) lived in households, 5 (1.7%) lived in non-institutionalized group quarters, and 0 (0%) were institutionalized.

There were 116 households, out of which 46 (39.7%) had children under the age of 18 living in them, 32 (27.6%) were opposite-sex married couples living together, 25 (21.6%) had a female householder with no husband present, 9 (7.8%) had a male householder with no wife present. There were 16 (13.8%) unmarried opposite-sex partnerships, and 1 (0.9%) same-sex married couples or partnerships. 35 households (30.2%) were made up of individuals, and 5 (4.3%) had someone living alone who was 65 years of age or older. The average household size was 2.53. There were 66 families (56.9% of all households); the average family size was 3.21.

The population was spread out, with 91 people (30.5%) under the age of 18, 22 people (7.4%) aged 18 to 24, 96 people (32.2%) aged 25 to 44, 80 people (26.8%) aged 45 to 64, and 9 people (3.0%) who were 65 years of age or older. The median age was 31.5 years. For every 100 females, there were 101.4 males. For every 100 females age 18 and over, there were 97.1 males.

There were 139 housing units at an average density of 85.4 per square mile (33.0/km^{2}), of which 0 (0%) were owner-occupied, and 116 (100%) were occupied by renters. The homeowner vacancy rate was 0%; the rental vacancy rate was 14.1%. 0 people (0% of the population) lived in owner-occupied housing units and 293 people (98.3%) lived in rental housing units.

== Government ==
In the state legislature, Herlong is in the 1st senatorial district, represented by Republican Megan Dahle, and the 1st Assembly district, represented by Republican Heather Hadwick.

Federally, Herlong is in California's 1st congressional district, represented by Republican James Gallagher.

== Notable people ==
- Mariannette Miller-Meeks (born 1955), U.S. representative for Iowa

== See also ==
- Federal Correctional Institution, Herlong
