= James W. Nye =

American politician (1815–1876)

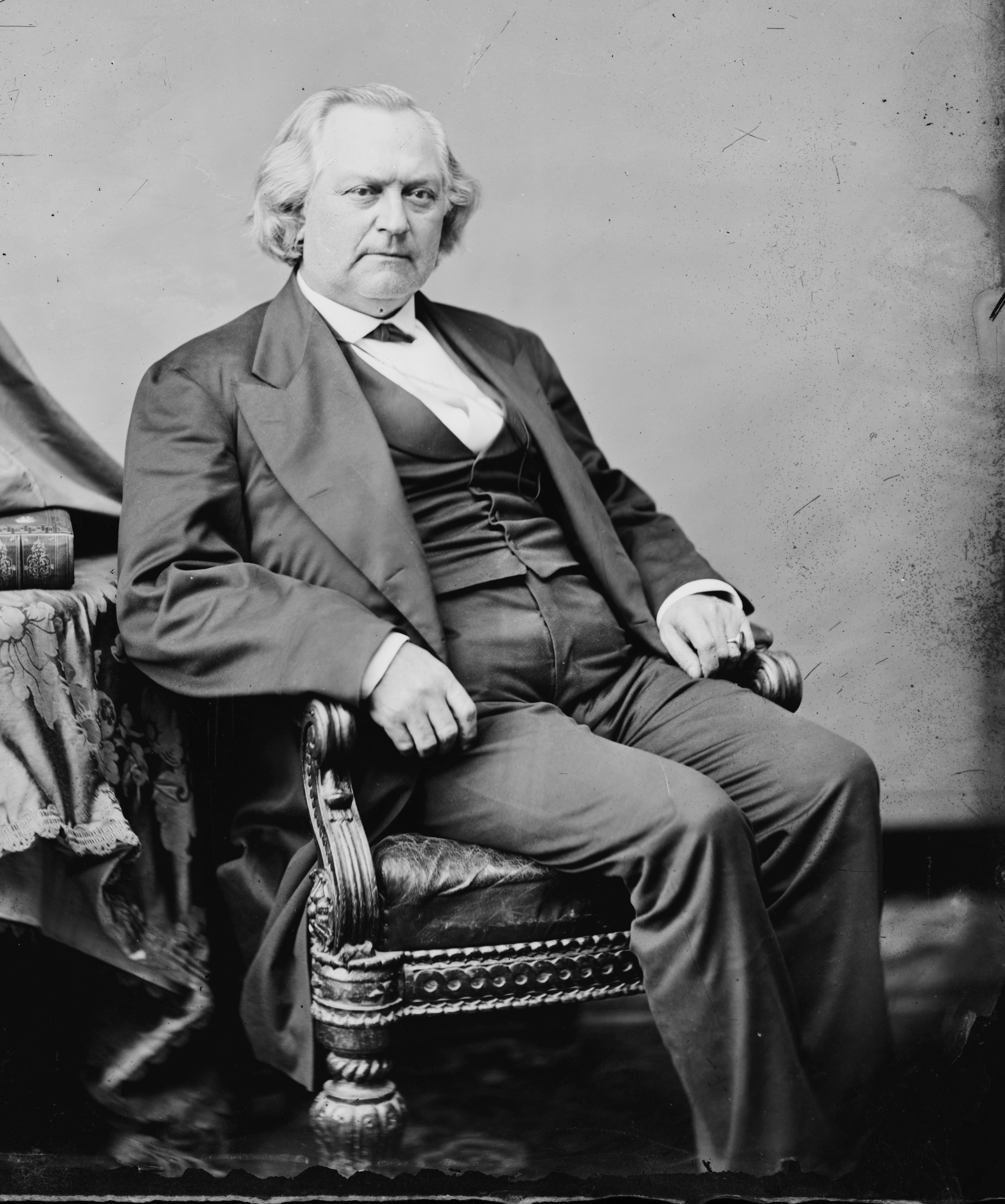

United States Senator from Nevada
- In office February 1, 1865 – March 3, 1873
- Preceded by: None
- Succeeded by: John P. Jones

Governor of Nevada Territory
- In office March 2, 1861 – December 5, 1864
- Preceded by: Isaac Roop as provisional governor
- Succeeded by: Henry G. Blasdel as state governor

Personal details
- Born: June 10, 1815 DeRuyter (town), New York, U.S.
- Died: December 25, 1876 (aged 61) White Plains, New York, U.S.
- Resting place: Woodlawn Cemetery; The Bronx, New York City, New York, U.S.
- Party: Republican; Free Soil (1840s)
- Profession: Attorney

James Warren Nye (June 10, 1815 – December 25, 1876) was an American attorney and politician. He was most notable for his service as Governor of Nevada Territory and a United States senator from Nevada.

== Biography ==
He was born in DeRuyter, New York, and attended the common schools and Homer Academy in Homer, New York. He then studied law with Lorenzo Sherwood and Martin P. Sweet of Hamilton, New York, and was admitted to the bar. Nye practiced with Sherwood in Hamilton as the firm of Sherwood & Nye.

In 1843, Nye was appointed a master in chancery. Nye served as surrogate of Madison County from 1844 to 1847 and county judge from 1847 to 1851. Nye was active in the New York Militia; in the early 1840s he was commander of the 17th Division's 35th Brigade as a brigadier general. In 1846 he was appointed commander of the 17th Division with the rank of major general.

During the New York Democratic Party's fight between the Barnburners and Hunkers in the late 1840s, Nye was identified with the anti-slavery Barnburners. He supported Martin Van Buren's candidacy as the Free Soil Party's nominee for president in 1848, and was an unsuccessful Free-Soil candidate for election to the 31st United States Congress.

He lived in Syracuse, New York from 1852 to 1857, where he continued the practice of law. In 1857, he moved to New York City, where he served as president of the Metropolitan Board of Police from 1857 to 1860.

In 1861, Nye was appointed by President Abraham Lincoln to be Governor of the newly created Nevada Territory.

Upon the admission of Nevada as a state into the Union in 1864, he was elected a Republican to the U.S. Senate. He was reelected in 1867 and served from February 1, 1865, to March 3, 1873. He was an unsuccessful candidate for reelection. While in the Senate, Nye was chairman of the Committee on Enrolled Bills (Thirty-ninth Congress), a member of the Committees on Revolutionary Claims (Fortieth Congress), and a member of the Committee on Territories (Forty-first Congress).

Washington journalist Benjamin Perley Poore described the personality Nye brought to Congress:

Senator Nye... sat for years at the right hand of Charles Sumner..., and used to delight in making comments on what transpired in language that was not agreeable to the fastidious Senator from Massachusetts, who would listen in a stately embarrassment which was delightful to Nye to witness, not wishing to show any offense, and yet thoroughly disgusted. Nye wasn't particularly witty in debate, and the speeches of Proctor Knott, McCreery, or Sam Cox were funnier than his; neither had he any Senatorial dignity whatever. He had, in its place, a vast store of humor and genial humanity—better articles, that brought him in love all that he lost in respect.

Mark Twain was briefly Nye's Senate secretary. In Sketches New and Old, he gave an account of their parting, which occurred after Twain supposedly wrote ridiculous letters to constituents following Nye's instructions not to address controversial issues.

Nye was considered insane during his later years, and resided in an asylum. He suffered from delusions, including the belief that he was dead and waiting for his coffin to arrive. Nye died in White Plains, New York on December 25, 1876, and was interred at Woodlawn Cemetery in The Bronx.

Nye County, Nevada was named for him.

U.S. Senate
Preceded by None	U.S. senator (Class 3) from Nevada; 1865–1873; Served alongside: William M. Stewart	Succeeded by John P. Jones
Political offices
Preceded by Isaac Roop provisional governor	Governor of Nevada Territory; 1861–1864	Succeeded by Henry G. Blasdel state governor
