= Stanley Rapp =

American marketing executive

Stanley "Stan" Rapp is an American marketing and advertising professional. Together with his then-partner, Tom Collins, he co-founded and was chief executive officer of Rapp & Collins (today rebranded as Rapp), for 23 years.

Rapp was also chief executive officer of McCann Relationship Marketing, MRM Worldwide, Inc. since 1997, and an Advisor of Advertising & Marketing Communications at TMX Communications Inc. He has been recognized by Ad Age magazine as one of the “101 individuals who shaped advertising in the 20th Century” and was elected to the Direct Marketing Association Hall of Fame. Direct Marketing magazine also named him one of its “industry legends” and he is one of only two recipients of the Direct Marketing Educational Foundation's Vision Award.

== Works ==
Rapp is the co-author of MaxiMarketing, which first predicted the turnaround from mass marketing to an individualized marketing paradigm. He is also the co-author of the book, Max-e-Marketing in the Net Future, that focuses on how web-based technologies are reshaping the direct and relationship marketing fields. His book, edited for McGraw-Hill, Reinventing Interactive and Direct Marketing, introduces an iDirect Marketing paradigm for the digital era. Six other books followed including Max-e-Marketing in the Net Future and Reinventing Interactive and Direct Marketing. In mid-2014, he began writing the book, Entangled Marketing, with Sebastian Jespersen, CEO of the global digital agency Vertic, on how to move beyond traditional engagement marketing.
