= Farum Rectory =

Coordinates: 55.8069°N 12.3570°E

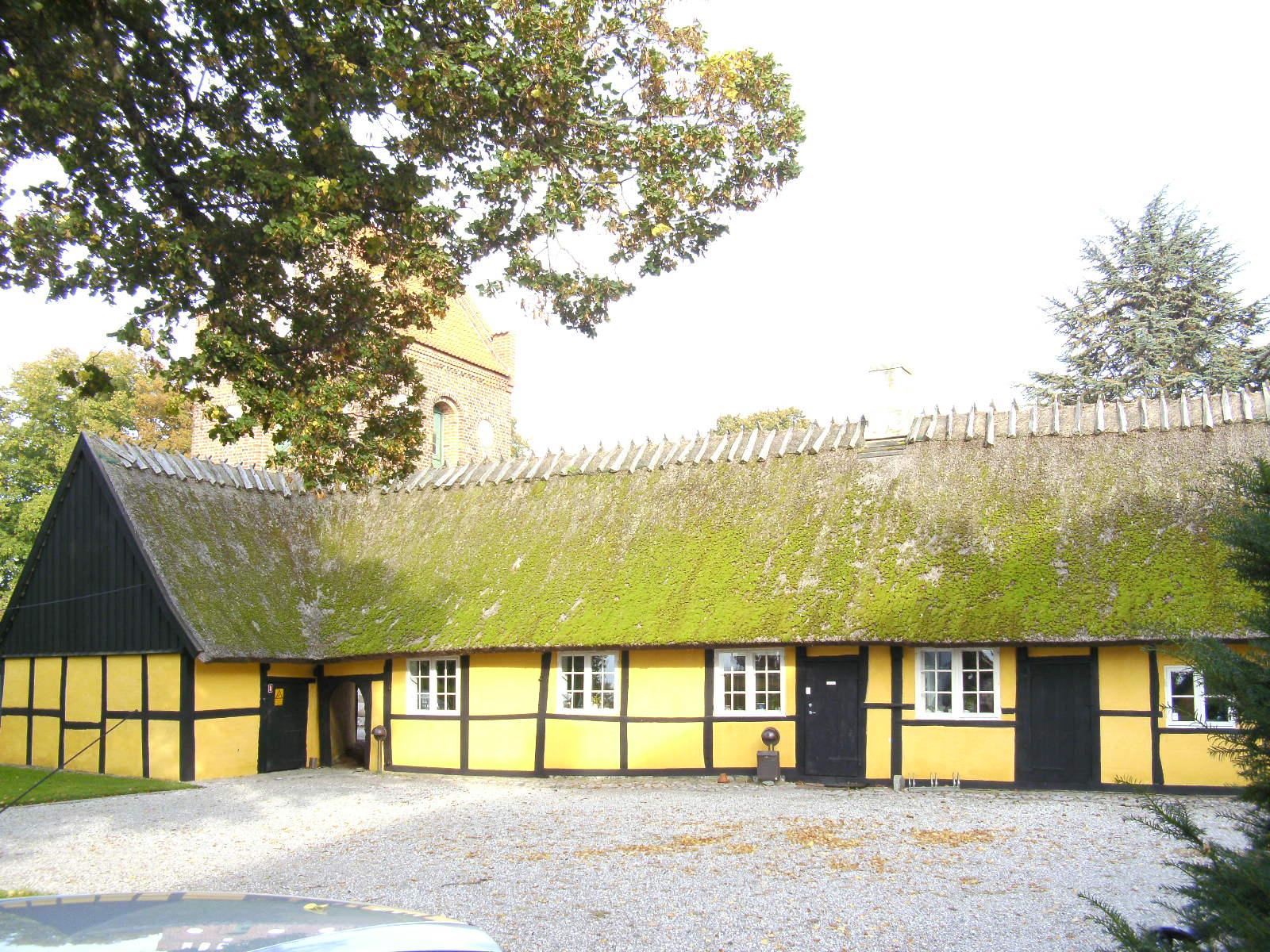
Farum Rectory

Farum Rectory is a listed rectory located adjacent to the graveyard surrounding Farum Church in the old, western part of Farum, Denmark. Built in 1724, the house has Timber framing and a thatched roof. It was listed in 1959.

== See also ==
- Farumgaard
