= Roop County, Nevada =

Former county in Nevada, United States

Coordinates: 39.1643°N 119.7673°W

Roop County
- County of Nevada Territory
- 1861–1864
- History
  - Established: 1861
  - Disestablished: 1864
- Contained within
  - Country: United States
  - Territory: Nevada Territory
Preceded by	Succeeded by
Nevada Territory	Lassen County; Washoe County
- Today part of: United States

Roop County, known until 1862 as Lake County, was a county of the Nevada Territory in the United States from 1861 until 1864. It was created in 1861 as one of the original nine counties of Nevada. In 1864 the land within its boundaries was divided between the newly created Lassen County, California and Washoe County, Nevada.

== History ==
In March 1861, Congress officially created the Nevada Territory, with the Honey Lake Valley and the area to its north included within its provisional bounds. At the time, the border between Nevada and California had not been formally surveyed and was thus poorly defined in Nevada's Organic Act. Later in 1861, Lake County was established in northwestern Nevada, creating a boundary dispute with California. Its name was chosen due to the many lakes in the area, including Honey Lake, Pyramid Lake, and Winnemucca Lake. In 1862 it was renamed Roop County after Isaac Roop, governor of the unofficial "Provisional Territorial Government of Nevada Territory", which had previously existed in the same area. Much of Roop County, including Susanville (named after Roop's daughter), was claimed by California as part of Plumas County. This led to an armed conflict known as the Sagebrush War, the War of Injunctions or the Roop County War.

This resulted in the appointment of a joint California–Nevada boundary survey, with Surveyor-General J. F. Houghton acting for the State of California and Butler Ives for the Territory of Nevada. The final surveyors' report, accepted by California on April 4, 1864, and by Nevada on February 7, 1865, proved that the Honey Lake area and virtually all of the population of Roop County was in California. The California portion of Roop County became part of the newly created Lassen County, California, in 1864. The remainder was ceded to Washoe County, Nevada.

== See also ==
- List of former United States counties
- List of Nevada counties
- Nataqua Territory
