= Lassen Emigrant Trail =

Historical Landmark in Bieber, California, United States

Lassen Emigrant Trail Markers
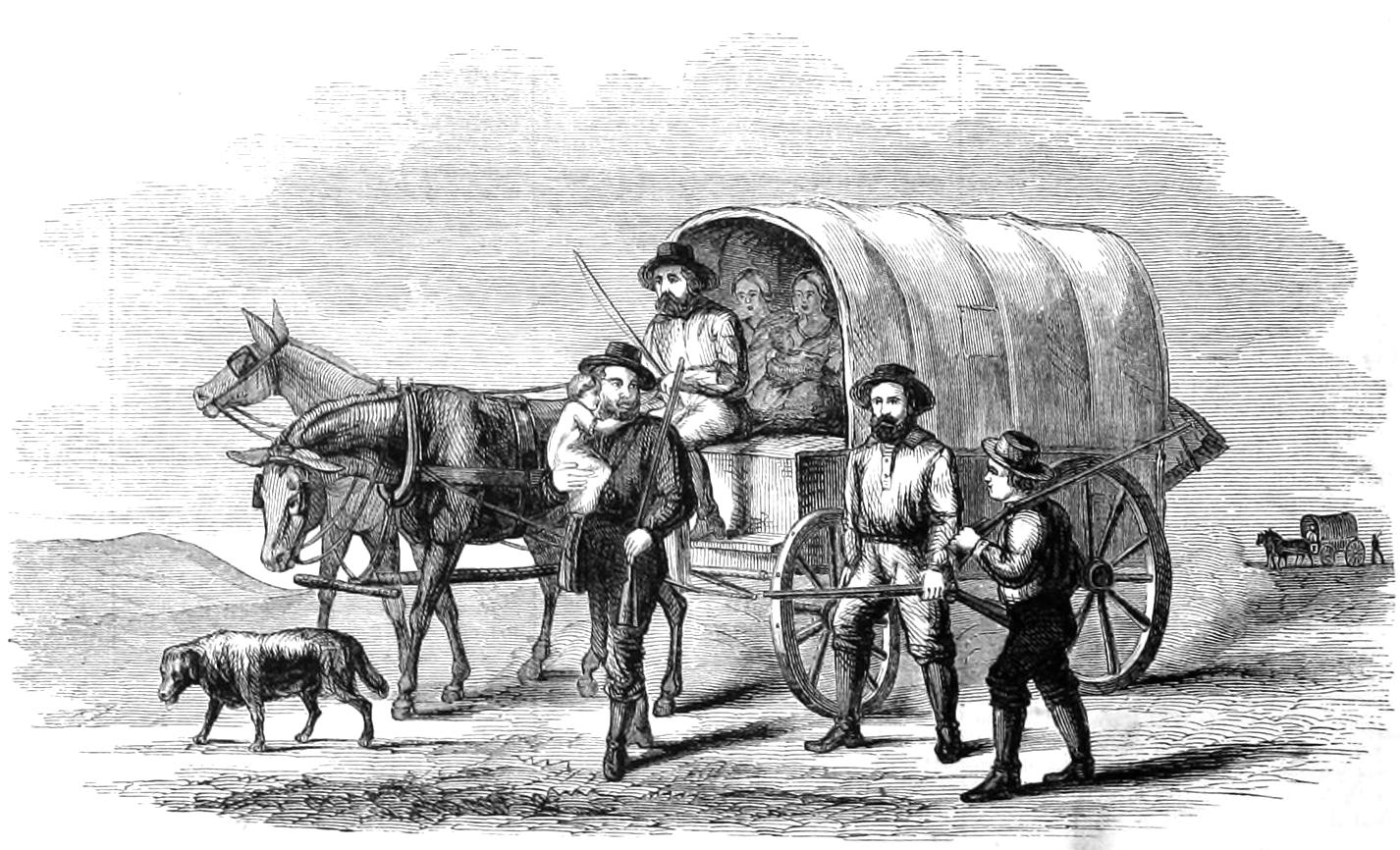
- Emigrants Wagon train

- Location within California Location within the United States
- 1. 763 41.121°N 121.138°W; 2. 678 40.314°N 121.056°W
- Location: 1. 763 Clara Bieber Memorial Park, Bieber, California; 2. 678 State Route 36 west of Westwood, California

History
- Built: 1848

California Historical Landmark
- Reference no.: 763 and 678

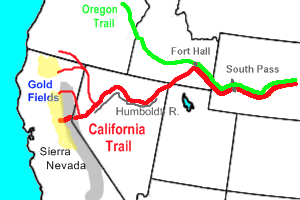
California Trail, the thick red line, the Lassen Cutoff is the middle thin red line

Lassen Emigrant Trail, also called the Lassen Cutoff, is a historical wagon road in Bieber, California and Westwood, California in Lassen County.

== Establishment ==
Peter Lassen built the Lassen Emigrant Trail in 1848 as a cutoff from the California Trail. Lassen was the leader of a Wagon train from Missouri to California. The Wagon train included 12 covered wagons full of emigrants heading west, some part of the California Gold Rush. The Lassen Emigrant Trail was used from 1848 to 1853 by large groups of prospectors. Indian wars started along the trail so emigrants started to use other trails.

== Historical markers ==
A California Historical Landmark marker No. 763, was placed near the trail on September 10, 1961. The marker was built by the California State Park Commission working with the Bieber and Lassen County Chambers of Commerce and Lassen County Historical Society at the Clara Bieber Memorial Park.

A Second Lassen Emigrant Trail California Historical Landmark, No.678 is on California State Route 36 west of Westwood, California.

== See also ==
- Westward Expansion Trails
- California Historical Landmarks in Lassen County
