= Sierra Army Depot =

Military facility in California, United States

- Herlong, California
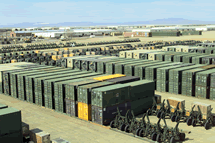
- Reserve Component Hospital Decrement for USAMMA

Site information
- Type: Military depot
- Controlled by: Tank-Automotive and Armaments Command

Site history
- Built: 1942

Garrison information
- Current commander: LTC Shivnesh S. Kumar

Amedee Army Airfield
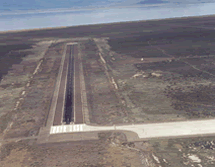
- IATA: AHC; ICAO: KAHC

Summary
- Airport type: Military
- Operator: US Army
- Location: Sierra Army Depot, California
- Elevation AMSL: 4,007 ft (1,221 m)
- Coordinates: 40°15′58.19″N 120°09′09.43″W
- Website: Sierra Army Depot
- Interactive map of Amedee Army Airfield

Runways
Direction	Length		Surface
Direction	m	ft	Surface
08	3,048	10,000	Asphalt
26	3,048	10,000	Asphalt
- Source: Federal Aviation Administration data for Amedee Army Airfield/AHC

Sierra Army Depot (SIAD) is a United States Army post and military equipment storage facility located near the unincorporated community of Herlong, California. It was built in 1942 as one of several ammunition storage facilities located far enough inland to be safe from Japanese attack, yet close enough to western military posts and ports to facilitate shipment of supplies. The site also met the requirement that the depot be in a dry and isolated area.

The depot is a subordinate of US Army Tank-Automotive and Armaments Command (TACOM).

== Introduction ==
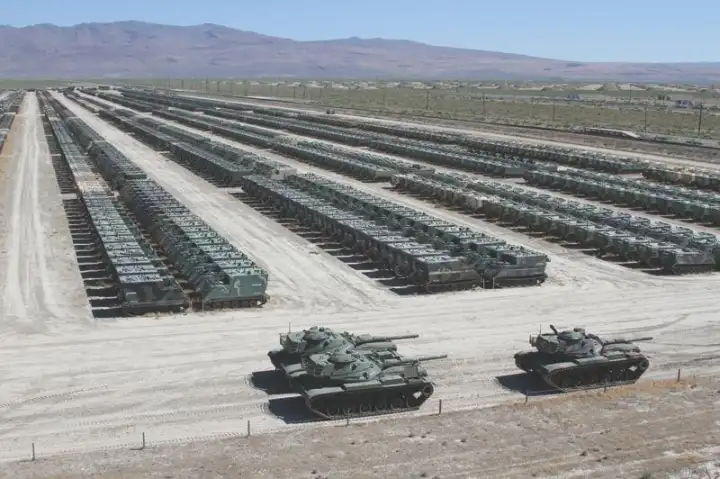
The Long-Term Storage section of Sierra Army Depot. Hundreds of M113 variants seem to stretch to the horizon. In the foreground are M60 main battle tanks.

Designated as a Center for Industrial and Technical Excellence (CITE) for all Petroleum and Water Systems, and Operational Project Stocks, Sierra Army Depot (SIAD) provides a unique readiness platform to the Total Army and Joint Force. SIAD performs a wide variety of long-term logistics and sustainment missions, ranging from equipment receipt and asset visibility to long-term care, storage and sustainment, to repair/reset of all Army fuel and water systems.

The depot fills a critical void in material and equipment management nearing the end of its first life. These unique operations provide readiness and operational value to the Department of Defense through the management and controlled redistribution of this equipment.

SIAD is highly experienced with equipment reset, new assembly/kitting operations, training operations, maintaining operational project stocks, and a redistribution mission for Class VII and Class IX items. It has established an End-of-First Life Center for combat and non-combat vehicles.

SIAD supports similar functions for Organizational Clothing and Individual Equipment (OCIE) and Central Management Office (CMO) to receive, identify, classify, receipt/record clothing for multiple agencies such as the Program Execution Office, the CMO, the Defense Logistics Agency, and the US Air Force.

The depot can process "excess" OCIE from these agencies and various Central Issue Facilities (CIFs) as well as returned items from Southwest Asia, including posts, camps and stations. These capabilities have enabled the depot to become a consolidation and distribution center for the CMO, supporting brigade-level OCIE reset operations and the US Army Reserve CIF. The depot also repairs defective ESAPI plates at considerable cost savings to the Army.

The depot is the primary storage site of equipment used to build Lockheed Martin F-22 Raptors. It houses over 30,000 fittings, jigs, and other tooling related to the production and maintenance of the F-22 for the planes still in service and for any possible future needs.

The depot and Anniston Army Depot will be the storage sites of the US Marine Corps' inventory of M1 Abrams tanks as well as other armored equipment as part of USMC Commandant Gen. David H. Berger's planning guidance "Force Design 2030". The last tanks left for the depot from the U.S. Marine Corps' base at 29 Palms in California in July 2020.

Amedee Army Airfield is located nine nautical miles (17 km) north of the central business district of Herlong at the Sierra Army Depot.

== Capabilities and mission execution ==
Sierra Army Depot was established in 1942 as ordnance and general supply storage depot. Over the years, SIAD has adapted to changing conditions by becoming the home to operational project systems. Today, SIAD offers a range of unique logistics, sustainment, and maintenance capabilities.

Capabilities include:

- Certified in both ISO 9001:2015 Quality Management and ISO 14001:2015 Environmental Standard; on track to become a Voluntary Protection Program (VPP) Star-certified installation.
- More than 36,000 buildable acres.
- 10,000-foot runway capable of supporting military and commercial aircraft.
- Experts in assembly and kit configuration management, packaging, and containerization of military unique systems.
- Continuously invests in process improvement to refine and advance core competencies of logistics, rapid deployment, and industrial operation.
- Executes the receipt, accountability, storage, care of supplies in storage, reset, upgrades, system configuration, kitting and assembly, and worldwide shipping on a number of programs, to include Army Prepositioned Stocks, Force Provider, wholesale stocks and various fleet commodities.
- Serves as a central management location for item and program-managed wholesale stocks and assets; receives, records, classifies, stores, maintains, sustains, and ships material in owners' direction; total visibility of assets and materials to determine disposition and analyze future requirements.
- Modern organic transportation network, capable of supporting all military and commercial aircraft, rail, and trucks able to respond immediately to all requirements worldwide.
- Preservation and packaging prototyping.
- The Army's largest dedicated retrograde facility for equipment and material returning from units and theater; performs logistics management on a majority of the agency's non-Army managed items, Army-managed items, and returned Class IX equipment for reutilization and redistribution with guidance from item and program managers.
- Manages a majority of the Army's retrograded Nonstandard Equipment (NSE); receives, identifies, classifies, inventories, stores, secures, inspects, packages, and ships worldwide.
- Receives, identifies, classifies, inventories, stores, secures, inspects, packages, and ships worldwide, a large volume of the Army's OCIE items.
- Manages excess Class VII major end items in its combat vehicle and equipment End-of-First Life Center; more than 20,000 combat vehicles and equipment items stored for item managers; receives, identifies, classifies, inventories, stores, secures, and ships assets; performs controlled parts' harvesting for production lines, active Army units, and foreign military sales.

== Industrial skills and facilities ==
With more than 1,000 structures, SIAD'S buildings include igloos, warehouses, and maintenance buildings.

Containerization and assembly: The depot's kitting and assembly capability includes prototyping configuring, inspection and assessment of returns, replacements, preservation and packaging, equipment testing, containerization, and shipment.

Container rotator: The rotator is used as an efficient way to rotate ISO, TRICON, and MILVAN shipping containers, reducing the total handling time from several hours to 20 minutes, and reducing manpower needs for container logistics support.

End-of-First Life Center: SIAD's combat vehicle End-of-First Life Center includes equipment consolidation surveillance and inspection, prepositioned stock, care of supplies in storage, asset and inventory management, regeneration programs for end items, and subcomponents, upgrades and redistribution, configuration management, kitting and system assembly/disassembly.

Maintenance: SIAD's maintenance personnel are able to facilitate mechanical repairs, corrosion control, metal fabrication, and repairs.

Retrograde, reutilization, and redistribution: The largest organization at SIAD, the reclamation and redistribution facilities receive retrograde materials from southwest Asia, Europe, and posts, camps and stations across the US.

Transportation: SIAD is recognized for its transportation capabilities because of its airfield, its joint air operations training, and the improved logistical support to the Warfighter.

== See also ==
- American Theater (1939–1945)
- Desert Training Center
- Military history of the United States during World War II
- United States home front during World War II
- DeWitt General Hospital
