= Toomes Creek =

Stream in California, U.S.

Coordinates: 39.9703°N 122.0807°W

Toomes Creek is a stream in the U.S. state of California. The 4.5-mile (7.2 km) long stream is a tributary to the Sacramento River.

Toomes Creek was named after Albert G. Toomes, a local landowner.
