= Janesville, California =

Janesville
- census-designated place
- Location of Janesville in Lassen County, California.

- Location in California
- Coordinates: 40°17′48″N 120°31′27″W
- Country: United States
- State: California
- County: Lassen

Area
  - Total: 33.834 sq mi (87.629 km^{2})
  - Land: 33.814 sq mi (87.579 km^{2})
  - Water: 0.019 sq mi (0.050 km^{2}) 0.06%
- Elevation: 4,239 ft (1,292 m)

Population (2020)
  - Total: 2,461
  - Density: 72.78/sq mi (28.10/km^{2})
- Time zone: UTC-8 (Pacific (PST))
  - Summer (DST): UTC-7 (PDT)
- ZIP Code: 96114
- Area codes: 530, 837
- GNIS feature IDs: 1658853; 2611437

Janesville (also known as Lassen) is a sparsely populated census-designated place in Lassen County, California, United States. It is located 11 miles (18 km) southeast of Susanville, at an elevation of 4239 feet (1292 m). Janesville is located on the eastern slopes of the Sierra Nevada Mountain range. Its population is 2,461 as of the 2020 census, up from 1,408 from the 2010 census.

The community consists of an elementary school, a park, four churches, two gas stations, a pizza parlor, a coffee shop, a veterinary hospital, a hardware store, a post office, a Dollar General and a few other businesses.

Janesville stretches over a distance of 8 miles (13 km). Its ZIP Code is 96114. The community is served by area code 530.

== History ==
Fort Janesville

In 1860, after the First Battle of Pyramid Lake, part of the Paiute War and the Ormsby Massacre, settlers built a loopholed stockade for protection from an Indian attack that never materialized. The fort, which had a bastion, or block house, in its southwest corner, was located less than a mile from the town of Janesville. The site of the fort is now a California Historic Landmark No.758.

In 1864, Janesville lost to Susanville by one vote from becoming the county seat. The Janesville post office opened in 1861, closed for a time in 1864, changed its name to Lassen in 1914, and was renamed Janesville in 1923. The name honors Jane Bankhead, wife of an early settler.

== Geography ==
According to the United States Census Bureau, the CDP has a total area of 33.8 square miles (87.6 km^{2}), of which over 99% is land.

== Demographics ==
Historical population
Census	Pop.	Note	%±
2010	1,408		—
2020	2,461		74.8%
U.S. Decennial Census; 2010

Janesville first appeared as a census designated place in the 2010 U.S. census.

=== 2020 census ===
As of the 2020 census, Janesville had a population of 2,461, with a population density of 72.8 inhabitants per square mile (28.1/km^{2}). The age distribution was 21.7% under the age of 18, 6.5% aged 18 to 24, 21.9% aged 25 to 44, 30.7% aged 45 to 64, and 19.2% who were 65 years of age or older. The median age was 44.9 years. For every 100 females, there were 111.1 males, and for every 100 females age 18 and over, there were 113.5 males age 18 and over.

0.0% of residents lived in urban areas, while 100.0% lived in rural areas.

Racial composition as of the 2020 census
Race	Number	Percent
White	2,070	84.1%
Black or African American	6	0.2%
American Indian and Alaska Native	55	2.2%
Asian	21	0.9%
Native Hawaiian and Other Pacific Islander	3	0.1%
Some other race	55	2.2%
Two or more races	251	10.2%
Hispanic or Latino (of any race)	243	9.9%

The whole population lived in households. There were 958 households, of which 27.8% had children under the age of 18 living in them. Of all households, 57.6% were married-couple households, 7.1% were cohabiting couple households, 20.1% were households with a male householder and no spouse or partner present, and 15.1% were households with a female householder and no spouse or partner present. About 24.1% of all households were made up of individuals and 10.8% had someone living alone who was 65 years of age or older. The average household size was 2.57. There were 669 families (69.8% of all households).

There were 1,099 housing units at an average density of 32.5 units per square mile (12.5 units/km^{2}), of which 958 (87.2%) were occupied. Of the occupied units, 82.3% were owner-occupied and 17.7% were occupied by renters. The vacancy rate was 12.8%; the homeowner vacancy rate was 2.3% and the rental vacancy rate was 6.6%.

=== Income and poverty ===
In 2023, the US Census Bureau estimated that the median household income was $70,938, and the per capita income was $37,453. About 2.5% of families and 6.7% of the population were below the poverty line.

== Politics ==
In the state legislature, Janesville is in the 1st senatorial district, represented by Republican Megan Dahle, and the 1st Assembly district, represented by Republican Heather Hadwick.

Federally, Janesville is in California's 1st congressional district, represented by Republican James Gallagher.

== See also ==
- California Historical Landmarks in Lassen County
