= Nataqua Territory =

- Unofficial territory
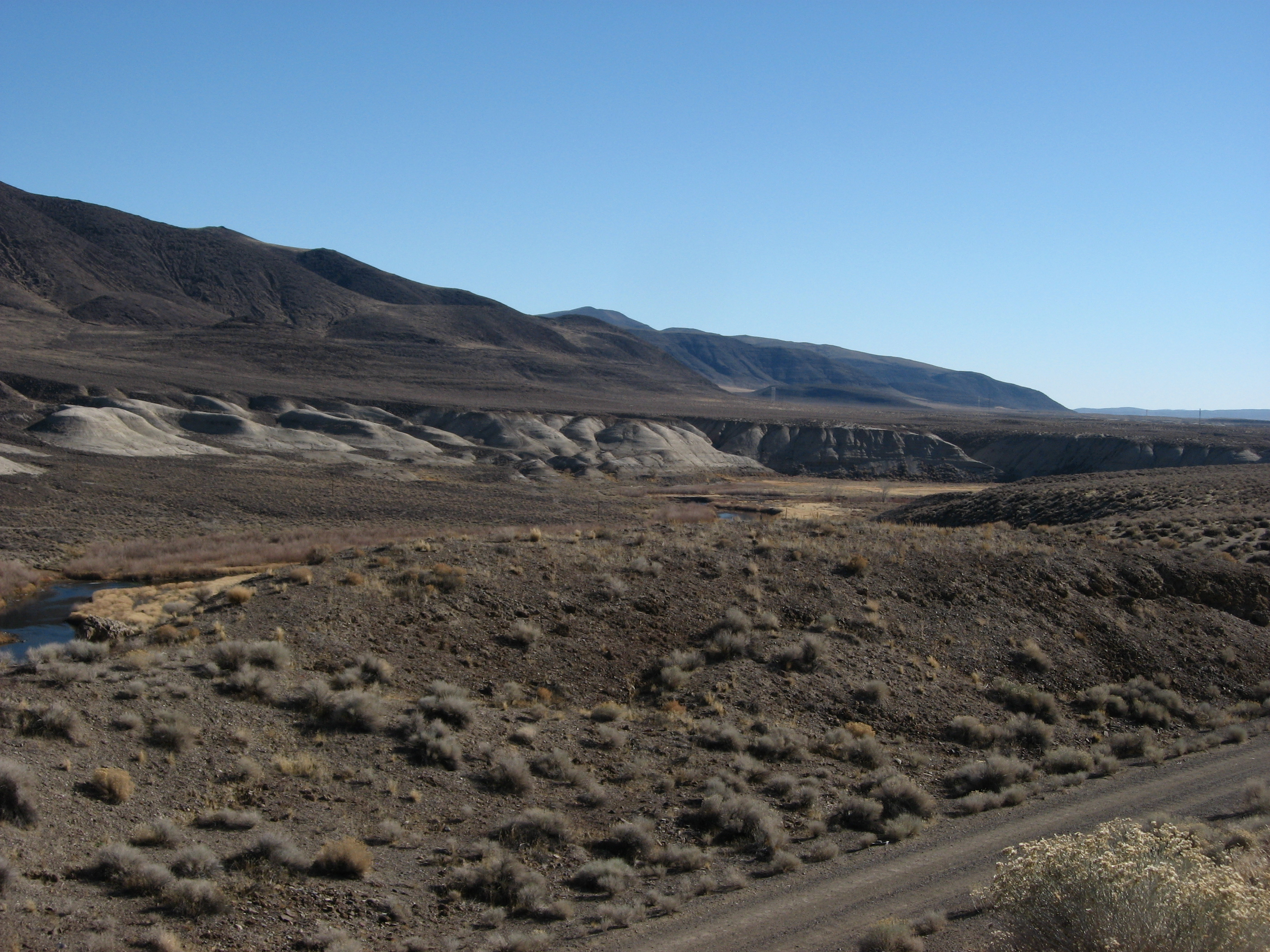
- The Nataqua territory covered the deserts of western Nevada.

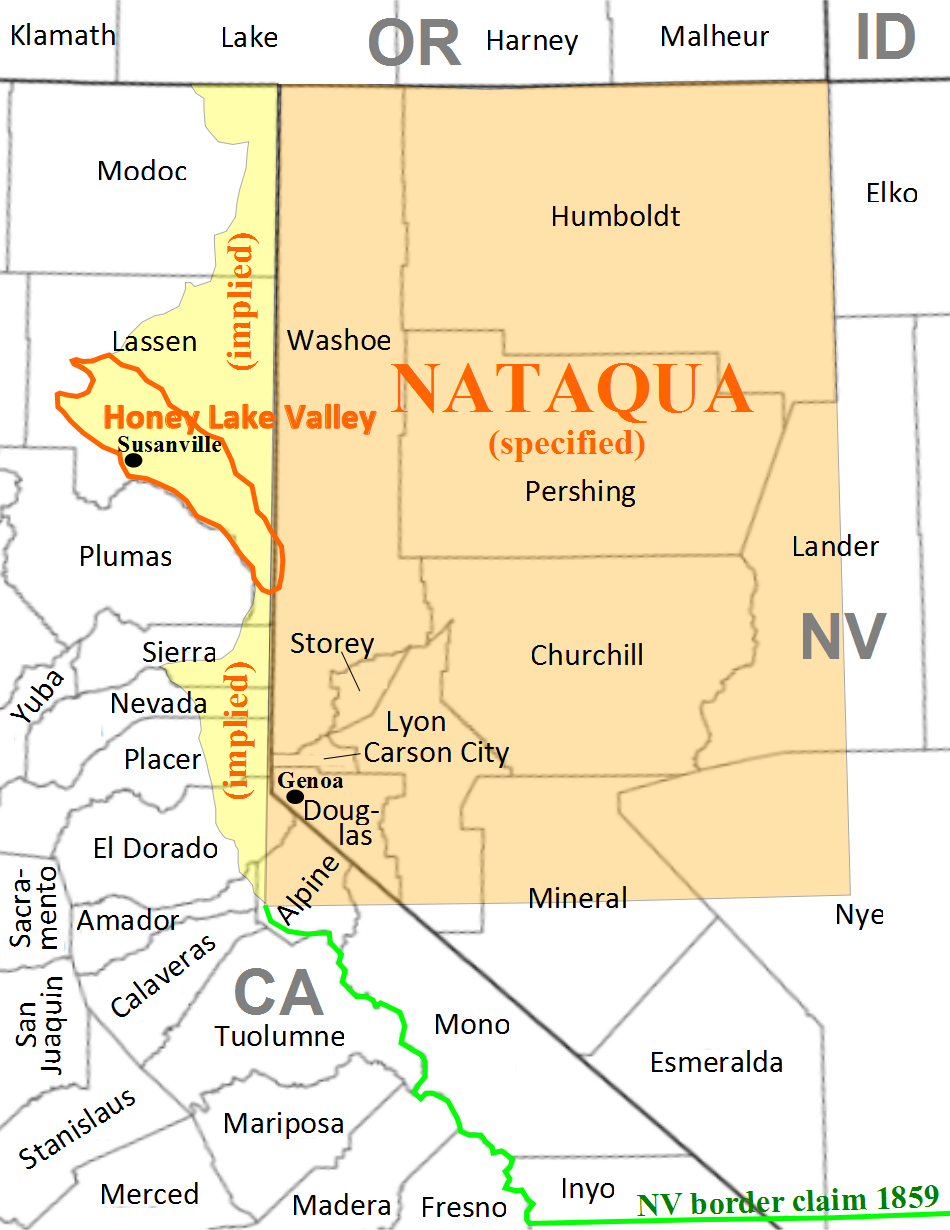
- By implication the east slope of the Sierra Nevada was intended to be part of Nataqua Territory
- Coordinates: 40.25°N 118.5°W
- Proclaimed: April 26, 1856
- Subsumed: March 1861

The Nataqua Territory was a short-lived, unofficial territory of the United States. It consisted of a portion of what is now northeastern California and northwestern Nevada. Nataqua Territory was the first incarnation of the proposed "State of Jefferson". In 1849, the border between California and the Utah Territory was defined by geographical coordinates that were not surveyed. On April 26, 1856, local residents took advantage of this ambiguity and justified their resistance to tax collectors from Plumas County, California, by proclaiming themselves part of a new "Territory of Nataqua." The twenty men of the Susanville convention who announced the Nataqua Territory had defined a rectangle-shaped territory by latitude and longitude, which inadvertently did not include their own Honey Lake Valley but did encompass most of what soon became western Nevada, along with 600 unsuspecting inhabitants. The Territory of Nataqua was a frontier land club or claim association, designed to protect the property rights of individual settlers until regular government reached the area. The movement was led by Peter Lassen and Isaac Roop. Association with the Utah Territory was unpalatable to the residents due to anti-Mormonism.

By 1857 the leaders of Honey Lake were working in close co-operation with other settlers on the eastern slope, in the movement centered in Carson Valley for the severance of the political ties of Utah and California and the creation of a new territory along the western rim of the interior plateau. During these years of self-government, Honey Lake Valley, though officially organized as a California township, was mostly left alone by the Plumas County officials. The uncertainty of the boundary and the possibility that the eastern slope would be detached from California and added to a new territory encouraged them to hold off their jurisdiction over the area. The "on-the-fence" status of Honey Lake Valley is one of the principal reasons that the settlers were able to maintain a spirit of independence. The separatist spirit of settlers in the adjoining areas of Honey Lake Valley, Carson Valley, Eagle Valley and several others led to a joint declaration of independence from Eastern Utah in July, 1859. Isaac Roop was chosen as governor of the "Provisional Territorial Government of Nevada Territory" in September and took the oath of office on December 13, 1859.

In March 1861, Congress created the official Territory of Nevada, with the Honey Lake Valley and the area to its north included within its provisional bounds. Later that year, Lake County was formed encompassing the area of the Nataqua Territory. It was renamed Roop County, Nevada in 1862. However, in 1863 a border survey found Susanville (which was named for Roop's daughter) and virtually all the population of Roop County was actually in California. The California portion of Roop County became part of the newly created Lassen County in 1864.
