= Isaac Roop =

American politician

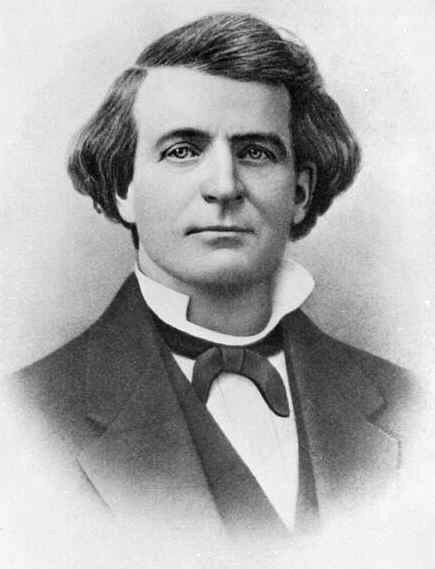

Provisional Governor of the Proposed Territory of Nevada
- In office December 15, 1859 – March 2, 1861
- Preceded by: None
- Succeeded by: James W. Nye (as Territorial Governor)

Personal details
- Born: March 13, 1822 Carroll County, Maryland, U.S.
- Died: February 14, 1869 (aged 46) Susanville, California, U.S.
- Resting place: Susanville Cemetery
- Party: Whig
- Spouse: Nancy (nee Gardner) Roop
- Children: 3
- Relatives: Susan Roop
- Occupation: Farmer, trader, politician
- Known for: Early settler of Susanville, California

Isaac Newton Roop (March 13, 1822 – February 14, 1869) was an American politician, pioneer, and member of the Whig Party. In 1859, he was the first elected (provisional) governor of the newly-proposed Nevada Territory.

== Early life ==
Roop was born in Carroll County, Maryland.

== Career ==
In 1851, the guide William Nobles started taking settlers, including the 29-year-old Isaac Roop and his family, over a route through the Sierra Nevada passing through the Honey Lake valley. Roop's first three years in California were spent in Shasta County in farming and trading. During that period, he also held the positions of postmaster and school commissioner. He had accumulated in that time upwards of $15,000 (~$444,965 in 2024) worth of property but in June 1853 lost it all by fire. It was then that Roop retreated to the Sierra Nevada and to Honey Lake, where he concentrated on his own backcountry holdings and nearly single-handedly erected the burg of Rooptown, which he would later name for his daughter Susan.

In September 1859, Roop was elected the first territorial governor of the proposed Nevada Territory. At the time, Susanville was thought to be in Nevada, instead of California. The new provisional government first convened on December 15, 1859, in the town of Genoa. Roop lived in the contested County of Roop. He was elected in 1861 to the new Nevada Territorial Senate.

After the county's dissolution in 1865, Roop returned to Susanville. Roop became Lassen County's district attorney for two terms.

== Personal life ==
On December 24, 1840, Roop married Nancy Gardner (attended college), his tutor. They had children: Susan Engle born November 13, 1841; John V. born November 27, 1843; and Isaiah J. born November 30, 1845. On June 20, 1850, Nancy died of typhoid fever.

Isaac Roop died in Susanville on February 14, 1869. His daughter Susan Engle Roop Arnold (1841-1921) resided in the town as well until her own death in 1921, and both were buried in the town's cemetery. There is a mural depicting father and daughter in Uptown Susanville on the outside wall of Johnson's Shoes.

Roop County, Nevada, was named after him.

Political offices
Preceded by None	Provisional Governor of the Proposed Nevada Territory; 1859 – 1861	Succeeded by James W. Nye; Territorial Governor
