= Sebastian Jespersen =

Danish businessman

Sebastian Vedsted Jespersen (born 6 May 1973) is the former CEO and co-founder of the digital agency Vertic. Sebastian Jespersen is an innovator, a business strategist, and a digital thought leader. The Internationalist awarded Jespersen "Agency Innovator 2012". Jespersen lives today in Copenhagen after spending more than 15 years in New York. He founded the digital agency Vertic over a decade ago; today, it operates globally and is part of Globant, a digitally native organization that operates a global network with more than 40 offices and over 30000 employees.

Before founding Vertic, Jespersen functioned as a management consultant in Europe and Asia at Ernst & Young Management Consulting and CSC Strategic Consulting.

His book on Entangled Marketing got published in the spring of 2016, and is co-authored with the Stan Rapp, co-founder and CEO of Rapp & Collins. In 2018, Jespersen and Rapp released a book sequel called "Share of Life" that has been recognized by several influential publications such as Forrester Research.
