= Honey Lake =

Lake in Lassen County, California, United States

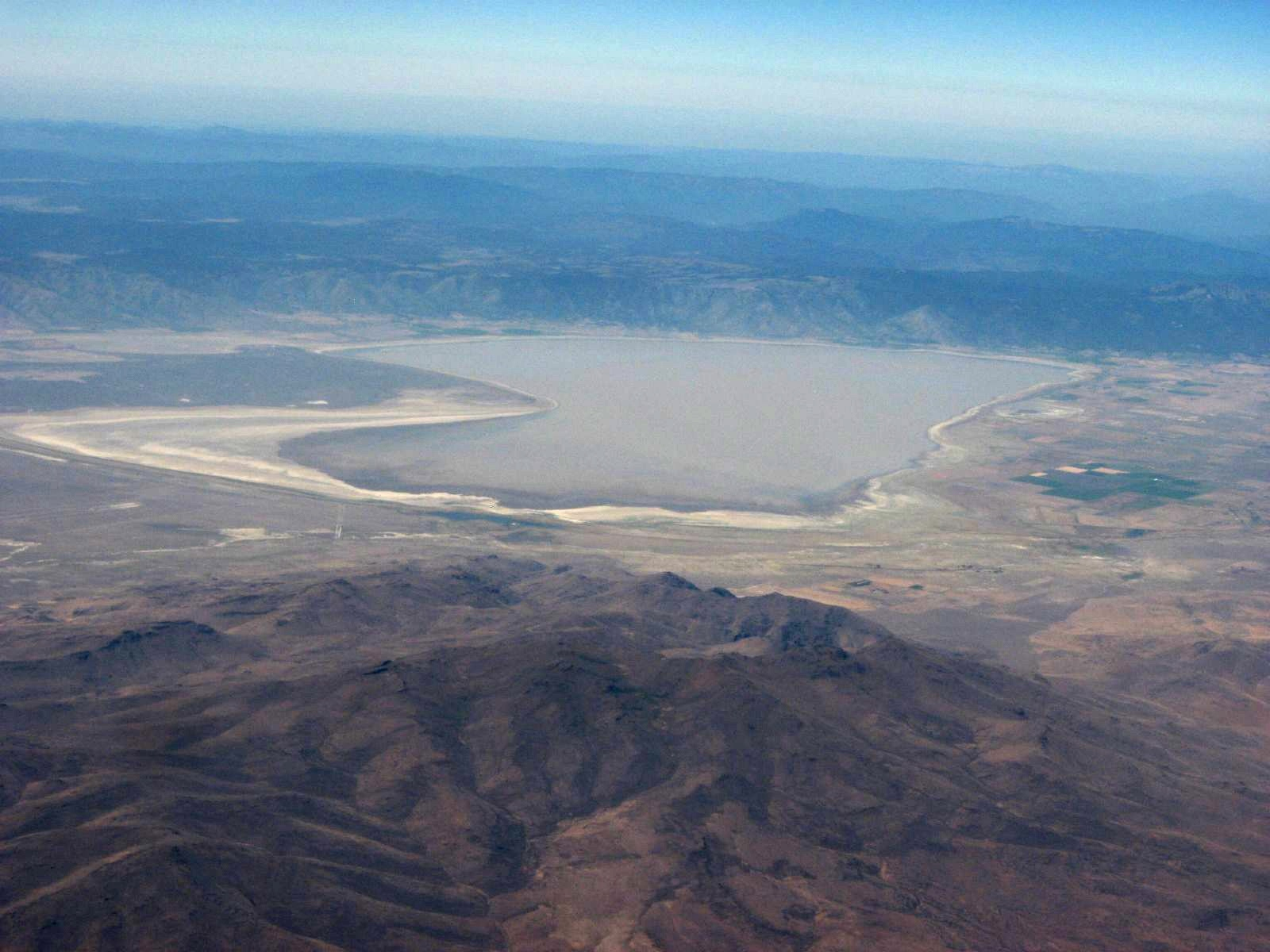
- Honey Lake, as seen from over the Skedaddle Mountains

- Location within California Location within the United States

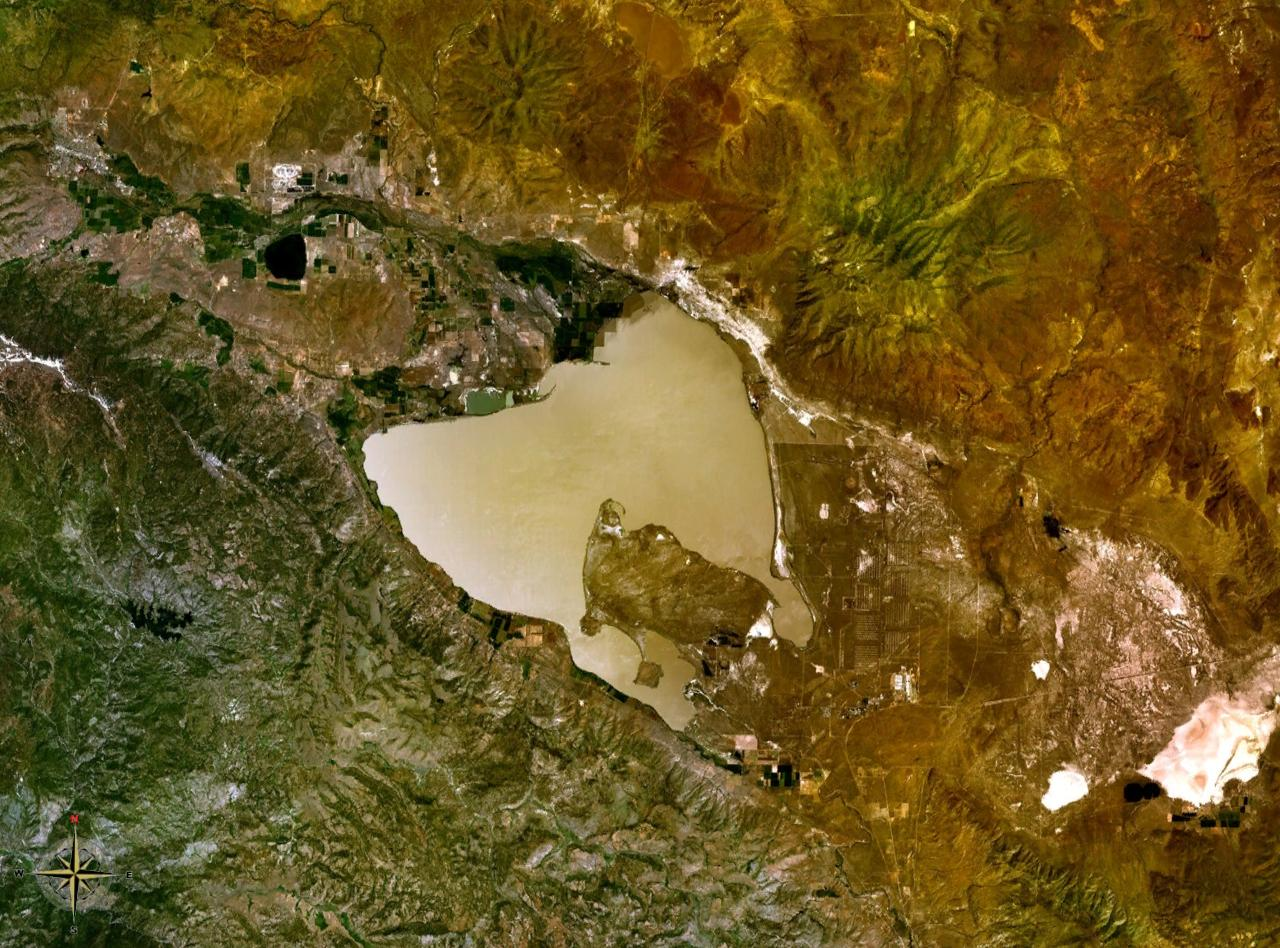
- Landsat 7 image of Honey Lake
- Location: Great Basin, Lassen County, California, United States
- Coordinates: 40°15′N 120°21′W
- Type: endorheic
- Primary inflows: Susan River, Long Valley Creek
- Basin countries: United States
- Surface area: 86 sq mi (220 km^{2})
- Max. depth: 0 to roughly 4 ft (1.2 m)
- Water volume: 0 to 1,200,000 acre-feet (1.5×10^{9} m^{3})
- Surface elevation: 1,214 m (3,983 ft)
- Settlements: Susanville (20 mi SE)

Honey Lake is an endorheic sink in the Honey Lake Valley in northeastern California, near the Nevada border. Summer evaporation reduces the lake to a lower level of 12 square kilometers (3,000 acres) and creates an alkali flat. Honey Lake dries almost completely in most years.

Honey Lake recreational activities include bird watching, picnicking, hiking, camping, warm-water fishing, and waterfowl hunting. The lake is part of the Honey–Eagle Lakes watershed of 2,770 sq mi (7,200 km^{2}) which includes the Honey Lake Basin of 2,201 sq mi (5,700 km^{2}).

== History ==
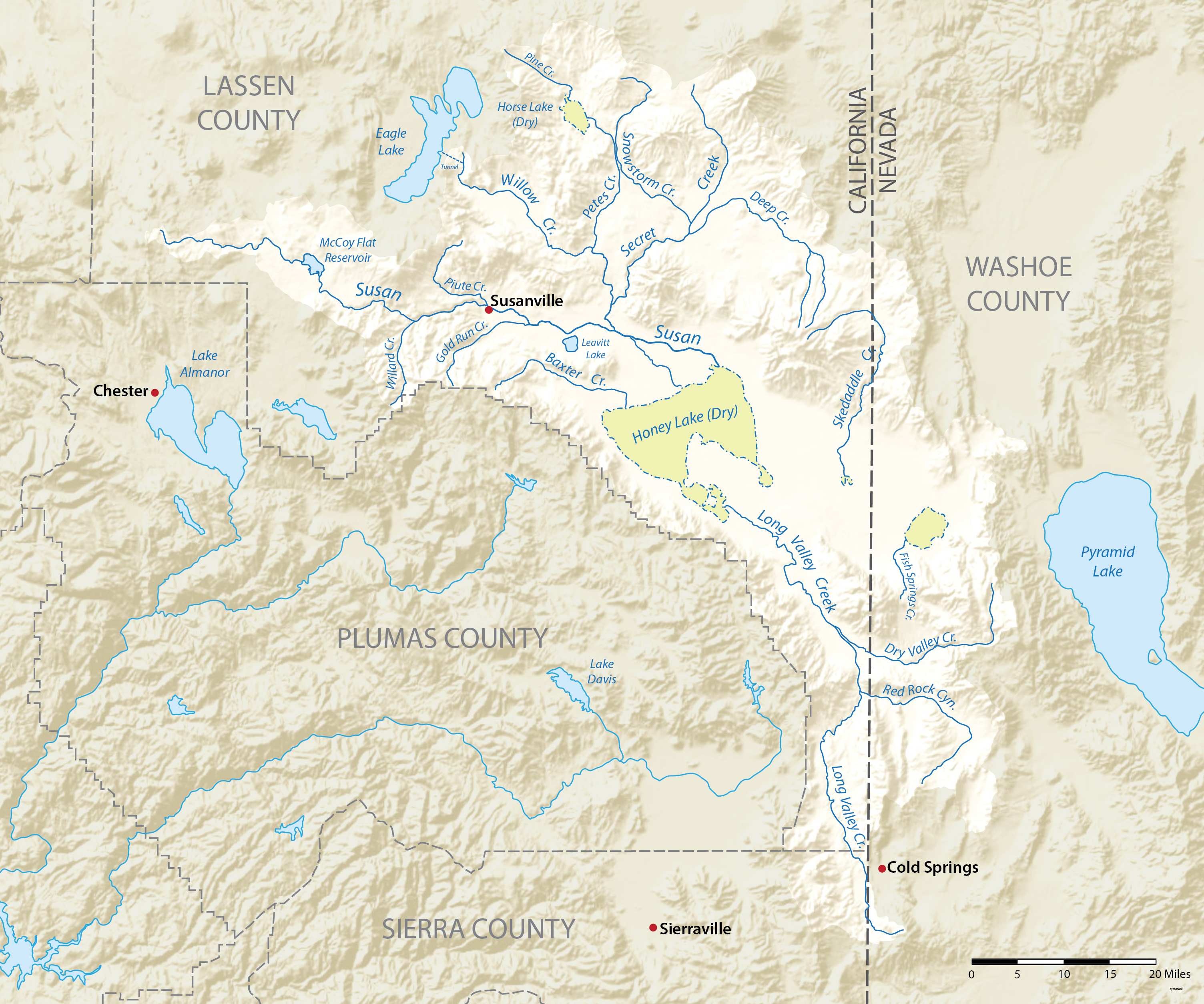
Map of Honey Lake watershed

The lake received its name from the honeydew produced by the abundant aphids inhabiting the area.

During the Pleistocene, Honey Lake and the entire Honey Lake Valley were part of Lake Lahontan in western Nevada, with a lake water level of 1,332 m (4,370 ft) a level of approximately 115 m (377 ft) higher than the 1984 level of Honey Lake. The connection to Lake Lahontan was through Astor Pass north of the Virginia Mountains into Pyramid Lake and through Sand Pass into the Smoke Creek Desert portion of Lake Lahontan to the northeast. Both passes are at approximately 1,224 m (4,016 ft) elevation.

Toward the end of the Civil War, the California Volunteer Cavalry used the route from Camp Bidwell (Chico, California) through the Honey Lake and Surprise Valley areas as a line of protection for silver mine output in the Owyhee district of Idaho.

Honey Lake was used as a bombing test range before World War II and for ordnance demolition and testing through the war and into the mid-1950s. In 1942 the Sierra Army Depot was installed directly east of the Lake.

== Honey Lake Wildlife Area ==
The Honey Lake Wildlife Area (HLWA) is a California Department of Fish and Game protected area wetland of 7667 acres at the mouth of the Susan River on the north shore of Honey Lake which has numerous bird species. Mammals such as deer and pronghorn and a modest amount of warm water fish are taken at Honey Lake. The state issued a special series of text-only season-long waterfowl hunting permit stamps for the area, starting with the 1956–57 season and ending with the 1985–86 season. Day permits were also sold, but these were in card form. The stamps are listed in several catalogs for U.S. fish & game stamps, including the Scott Specialized Catalog of United States Stamps & Covers. The wildlife area was designated in 1953. It includes approximately 7,600 acres of sagebrush habitat and wetlands that support migratory birds, including tundra swans. Wildlife viewing and birdwatching are among the area's recreational activities.

Honey Lake Wildlife Area (HLWA) was originally acquired to provide nesting and brood-rearing habitat for resident waterfowl, which is still a very important activity. Since its beginning, the wildlife area has expanded, and during peak migrations, as many as 30,000 snow and Canada geese and 20,000 ducks have been observed daily. During the winter, several bald eagles can be observed at the HLWA, and during the spring, the threatened sandhill cranes and other sensitive species such as the white-faced ibis and bank swallow can be found. Ring-necked pheasants and California quail can be observed year-round.

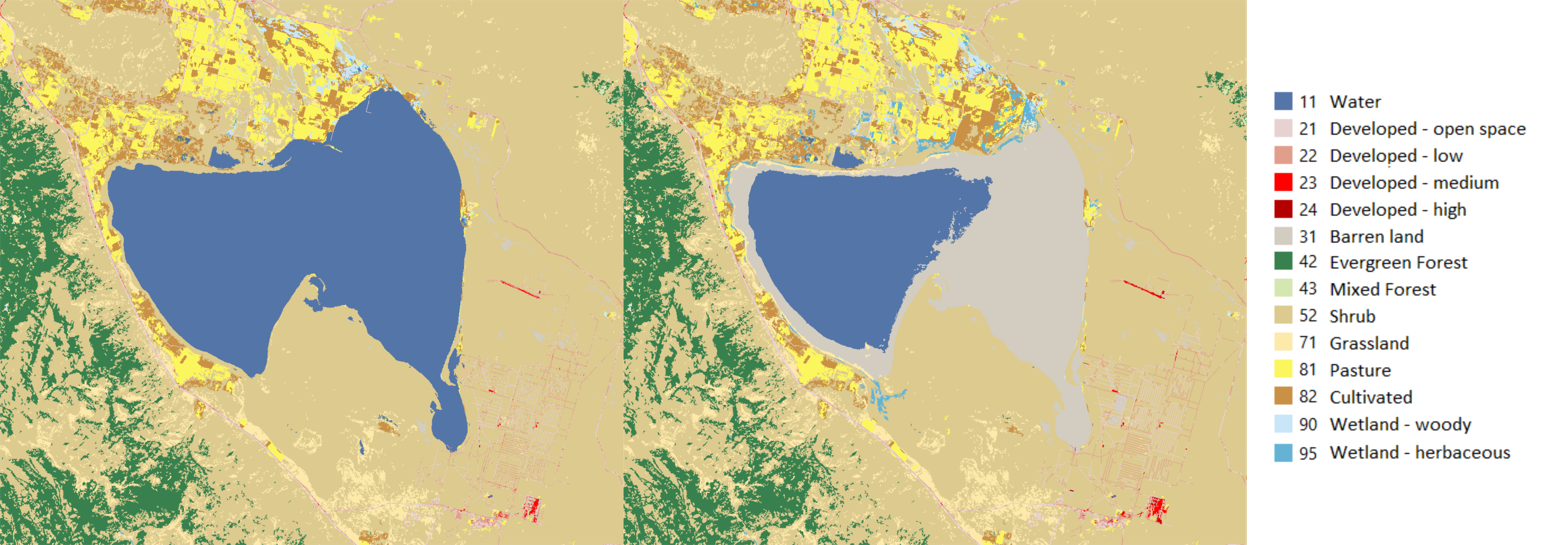
Honey Lake extent in 2001 and 2011. Data from USGS National Land Cover Dataset

== See also ==
- List of lakes in California
- Honey Lake Fault Zone
- Nataqua Territory
