= List of places in California (L) =

List of places in California - L

This list of current:

- cities
- towns, unincorporated communities
- counties, and other recognized places in the U.S. state of California.

Information on the number and names of counties in which the place lies, and its lower and upper ZIP Code bounds, if applicable are also included.

Name of place	Number of counties	Principal county	Lower zip code	Upper zip code
La Ballona	1	Los Angeles County	90232	
La Barr Meadows	1	Nevada County	95945	
Labranza	1	Merced County		
La Brea	1	Los Angeles County		
La Cañada	1	Los Angeles County	91011	
La Cañada Flintridge	1	Los Angeles County	91011	
Lacjac	1	Fresno County		
La Conchita	1	Ventura County		
La Costa	1	Los Angeles County	90265	
La Crescenta	1	Los Angeles County	91214	
La Crescenta-Montrose	1	Los Angeles County		
La Cresta	1	Kern County	93305	
La Cresta	1	San Diego County	92020	
La Delta	1	San Bernardino County		
Ladera	1	San Mateo County	94028	
Ladera Heights	1	Los Angeles County	90045	
Ladera Ranch	1	Orange County	92694	
Lafayette	1	Contra Costa County	94549	
La Fetra	1	Los Angeles County	91740	
La Fresa	1	Los Angeles County		
Lagol	1	Ventura County		
La Grange	1	Stanislaus County	95329	
Laguna	1	Los Angeles County		
Laguna Beach	1	Orange County	92651	52
Laguna Creek	1	Sacramento County		
Laguna Dam	1	Imperial County	85369	
Laguna Hills	1	Orange County	92653	
Laguna Junction	1	San Diego County		
Laguna Lake	1	San Luis Obispo County	93401	
Laguna Niguel	1	Orange County	92607	77
Laguna West	1	Sacramento County		
Laguna West-Lakeside	1	Sacramento County		
Laguna Woods	1	Orange County	92653	
Lagunita	1	Orange County		
Lagunitas	1	Marin County	94938	
Lagunitas-Forest Knolls	1	Marin County		
La Habra	1	Orange County	90631	
La Habra Heights	1	Los Angeles County	90631	
La Honda	1	San Mateo County	94020	
Lairport	1	Los Angeles County	90245	
La Jolla	1	Orange County	92670	
La Jolla	1	San Diego County	92037	38
La Jolla Amago	1	San Diego County		
La Jolla Indian Reservation	1	San Diego County	92263	
La Jolla Mesa	1	San Diego County		
La Joya	1	Los Angeles County		
Lake Almanor Country Club	1	Plumas County		
Lake Almanor Peninsula	1	Plumas County		
Lake Almanor West	1	Plumas County		
Lake Alpine	1	Alpine County	95223	
Lake Arrowhead	1	San Bernardino County	92352	
Lake City	1	Modoc County	96115	
Lake City	1	Nevada County		
Lake Davis	1	Plumas County		
Lake Elsinore	1	Riverside County	92530	32
Lake Forest	1	Orange County	92610	30
Lake Forest	1	Placer County	95730	
Lakehead	1	Shasta County	96051	
Lakehead-Lakeshore	1	Shasta County		
Lake Henshaw	1	San Diego County	92070	
Lake Hills Estates	1	El Dorado County	95630	
Lake Hughes	1	Los Angeles County	93532	
Lake Isabella	1	Kern County	93240	
Lake Kirkwood	1	El Dorado County	95646	
Lakeland Village	1	Riverside County	92530	
Lake Los Angeles	1	Los Angeles County	93550	
Lake Majella	1	Monterey County		
Lake Mary	1	Mono County	93546	
Lake Morena Village	1	San Diego County	92006	
Lake Nacimiento	1	San Luis Obispo County		
Lake of the Pines	1	Nevada County		
Lake of the Woods	1	Kern County	93225	
Lakeport	1	Lake County	95453	
Lake San Marcos	1	San Diego County	92078	
Lake Sherwood	1	Los Angeles County	91361	
Lakeshore	1	Fresno County	93634	
Lakeshore	1	Shasta County		
Lakeside	1	San Diego County	92040	
Lakeside Farms	1	San Diego County	92040	
Lakeside Park	1	Los Angeles County		
Lake Tahoe Airport	1	El Dorado County	95731	
Lake Tamarisk	1	Riverside County	92239	
Lake Valley	1	El Dorado County		
Lakeview	1	Kern County		
Lakeview	1	Kern County	93307	
Lakeview	1	Riverside County	92567	
Lakeview	1	San Diego County	92040	
Lakeview Hot Springs	1	Riverside County		
Lake View Terrace	1	Los Angeles County	91342	
Lakeville	1	Sonoma County	94952	
Lake Wildwood	1	Nevada County		
Lakewood	1	Los Angeles County	90712	16
Lakewood Park	1	Los Angeles County		
Lakin	1	Siskiyou County		
La Loma	1	Stanislaus County	95350	
Lamanda	1	Los Angeles County		
Lamanda Park	1	Los Angeles County		
Lambert	1	Sacramento County		
Lambert	1	Sonoma County	95448	
La Mesa	1	San Diego County	91941	44
La Metro	1	Los Angeles County		
La Mirada	1	Los Angeles County	90638	
La Mirada East	1	Los Angeles County	90638	
Lamoine	1	Shasta County		
Lamont	1	Kern County	93241	
Lanare	1	Fresno County	93656	
Lancaster	1	Los Angeles County	93534	86
Lancha Plana	1	Amador County		
Landers	1	San Bernardino County	92285	
Land Park	1	Sacramento County	95822	
Landscape	1	Alameda County	94707	
Lane	1	San Joaquin County		
Lanes	1	Amador County		
Lanfair	1	San Bernardino County		
Lang	1	Los Angeles County		
Lansdale	1	Marin County	94960	
La Palma	1	Orange County	90623	
La Panza	1	San Luis Obispo County	93453	
La Patera	1	Santa Barbara County	93117	
Lapis	1	Monterey County		
La Playa	1	San Diego County		
La Porte	1	Plumas County	95981	
La Posta Indian Reservation	1	San Diego County	92071	
La Presa	1	San Diego County	92077	
La Puente	1	Los Angeles County	91744	49
La Quinta	1	Riverside County	92253	
Larabee	1	Humboldt County		
Larabee Ranch	1	Humboldt County	95569	
La Rambla	1	Los Angeles County		
Larchmont Riviera	1	Sacramento County	95826	
Largo	1	Mendocino County		
Largo Vista	1	Los Angeles County		
La Riviera	1	Sacramento County		
Larkfield	1	Sonoma County	95403	
Larkfield-Wikiup	1	Sonoma County		
Larkmead	1	Napa County		
Larkspur	1	Marin County	94939	
Larwin Plaza	1	Solano County	94590	
La Salle	1	Santa Barbara County		
Lasco	1	Lassen County		
Las Cruces	1	Santa Barbara County	93117	
La Selva Beach	1	Santa Cruz County	95076	
Las Flores	1	Los Angeles County	90265	
Las Flores	1	Orange County	92688	
Las Flores	1	San Diego County		
Las Flores	1	Tehama County	96035	
Las Gallinas	1	Marin County		
La Sierra	1	Riverside County	92505	
La Sierra Heights	1	Riverside County		
Las Juntas	1	Contra Costa County		
Las Lomas	1	Monterey County	95076	
Las Lomas	1	Sonoma County	95441	
Las Palmas	1	Fresno County		
Las Posas Estates	1	Ventura County	93010	
Lassen	1	Lassen County		
Lassen View	1	Plumas County		
Lassen Volcanic National Park	4	Lassen County	96063	
Lassen Volcanic National Park	4	Plumas County	96063	
Lassen Volcanic National Park	4	Shasta County	96063	
Lassen Volcanic National Park	4	Tehama County	96063	
Last Chance	1	Placer County		
Las Vinas	1	San Joaquin County		
Lathrop	1	San Joaquin County	95330	
La Tijera	1	Los Angeles County	90043	
Latin	1	Los Angeles County		
Laton	1	Fresno County	93242	
Latrobe	1	El Dorado County	95682	
La Tuna Canyon	1	Los Angeles County	91352	
Laughlin	1	Mendocino County		
Laurel	1	Alameda County	94619	
Laurel	1	San Mateo County		
Laurel	1	Santa Cruz County	95030	
Laurel Canyon	1	Los Angeles County	91605	
Lava Beds National Monument	2	Modoc County	96134	
Lava Beds National Monument	2	Siskiyou County	96134	
La Verne	1	Los Angeles County	91750	
Lavic	1	San Bernardino County		
La Vina	1	Madera County	93637	
Lawndale	1	Los Angeles County	90260	
Lawndale	1	Sonoma County	95452	
Lawndale Army Missile Plant	1	Los Angeles County	90260	
Lawrence	1	Santa Clara County		
Laws	1	Inyo County	93514	
Laytonville	1	Mendocino County	95454	
Laytonville Rancheria	1	Mendocino County	95454	
Lazy Acre	1	Kern County	93317	
Leadfield	1	Inyo County		
Leaf	1	Siskiyou County		
Leavitt	1	Lassen County		
Lebec	1	Kern County	93243	
Leesdale	1	Ventura County		
Leesville	1	Colusa County	95987	
Lee Vining	1	Mono County	93541	
Leffingwell	1	Los Angeles County		
Leggett	1	Mendocino County	95585	
Le Grand	1	Merced County	95333	
Leimert Park	1	Los Angeles County	90062	
Leisure Town	1	Solano County		
Leisure World	1	Orange County	90740	
Lemon	1	Ventura County		
Lemona	1	Riverside County		
Lemoncove	1	Tulare County	93244	
Lemon Cove	1	Tulare County		
Lemon Grove	1	San Diego County	91945	46
Lemon Heights	1	Orange County	92705	
Lemoore	1	Kings County	93245	
Lemoore Naval Air Station	2	Fresno County	93245	
Lemoore Naval Air Station	2	Kings County	93245	
Lennox	1	Los Angeles County	90304	
Lento	1	Santa Barbara County		
Lenwood	1	San Bernardino County	92311	
Leon	1	San Bernardino County		
Leona Valley	1	Los Angeles County	93551	
Lerdo	1	Kern County		
Lerona	1	Fresno County		
Letterman	1	San Francisco County	94129	
Letterman Army Medical Center	1	San Francisco County	94129	
Leucadia	1	San Diego County	92024	
Levis	1	Fresno County		
Lewiston	1	Trinity County	96052	
Lexington Hills	1	Santa Clara County		
Liberty	1	Sonoma County		
Liberty Acres	1	Los Angeles County	90250	
Liberty Farms	1	Solano County	95620	
Liberty Park	1	Orange County		
Libfarm	1	Solano County	95620	
Lick	1	Santa Clara County		
Lick Observatory	1	Santa Clara County		
Lido Isle	1	Orange County	92663	
Likely	1	Modoc County	96116	
Likely Rancheria	1	Modoc County	96116	
Lilac	1	San Diego County		
Lily Cup	1	Riverside County		
Limco	1	Ventura County	93060	
Lime Spur	1	Tuolumne County		
Limon	1	Ventura County		
Limoneira	1	Ventura County		
Linbrook	1	Orange County		
Lincoln	1	Placer County	95648	
Lincoln Acres	1	San Diego County	91947	
Lincoln Crest	1	Los Angeles County		
Lincoln Heights	1	Los Angeles County	90031	
Lincoln Park	1	Los Angeles County		
Lincoln Village	1	Los Angeles County	90810	
Lincoln Village	1	Sacramento County	95827	
Lincoln Village	1	San Joaquin County	95207	
Lind Cove	1	Tulare County	93221	
Linda	1	Yuba County	95901	
Linda Mar	1	San Mateo County	94044	
Linda Mar Gardens	1	San Diego County	92075	
Linda Vista	1	Los Angeles County		
Linda Vista	1	San Diego County	92111	
Linda Vista	1	Santa Clara County	95127	
Linden	1	San Joaquin County	95236	
Linden Avenue	1	San Mateo County	94080	
Lindenwood	1	San Mateo County	94025	
Lindsay	1	Tulare County	93247	
Lingard	1	Merced County	95340	
Linne	1	San Luis Obispo County		
Linnell	1	Tulare County	93277	
Lira	1	Sutter County		
Lisko	1	Tulare County		
List	1	Tulare County		
Litchfield	1	Lassen County	96117	
Little Grass Valley	1	Plumas County		
Little Lake	1	Inyo County	93542	
Little Lake	1	Riverside County	92343	
Little Morongo Heights	1	San Bernardino County	92256	
Little Norway	1	El Dorado County	95721	
Little Reed Heights	1	Marin County	94920	
Littleriver	1	Mendocino County	95456	
Littlerock	1	Los Angeles County	93543	
Little Shasta	1	Siskiyou County	96064	
Little Valley	1	Lassen County	96053	
Live Oak	1	Sacramento County		
Live Oak	1	Santa Cruz County	95062	
Live Oak	1	Sutter County	95953	
Live Oak Acres	1	Ventura County	93022	
Live Oak Canyon	1	Los Angeles County	91750	
Live Oak Springs	1	San Diego County	92062	
Livermore	1	Alameda County	94550	
Livingston	1	Merced County	95334	
Llanada	1	San Benito County		
Llano	1	Los Angeles County	93544	
Lobitos	1	San Mateo County	94019	
Lobo	1	Orange County	90680	
Locans	1	Fresno County		
Loch Lomond	1	Lake County	95426	
Locke	1	Sacramento County	95690	
Lockeford	1	San Joaquin County	95237	
Lockhart	1	San Bernardino County	92347	
Lockwood	1	Monterey County	93932	
Locust	1	Marin County	94941	
Lodgepole	1	Lassen County		
Lodge Pole	1	Tulare County	93262	
Lodi	1	San Joaquin County	95240	42
Lodi Junction	1	San Joaquin County		
Lodoga	1	Colusa County	95979	
Loftus	1	Shasta County	96051	
Logan	1	San Benito County		
Logandale	1	Glenn County		
Logan Heights	1	San Diego County		
Loganville	1	Sierra County		
Lois	1	Tulare County		
Lokern	1	Kern County		
Lokoya	1	Napa County		
Loleta	1	Humboldt County	95551	
Loma	1	Los Angeles County	90814	
Loma	1	Tulare County		
Loma Linda	1	San Bernardino County	92354	
Loma Mar	1	San Mateo County	94021	
Loma Portal	1	San Diego County		
Loma Rica	1	Yuba County	95901	
Lomas Santa Fe	1	San Diego County	92075	
Loma Verde	1	Marin County	94947	
Lombard	1	Napa County		
Lomita	1	Los Angeles County	90717	
Lomita Park	1	San Mateo County	94066	
Lomo	1	Butte County		
Lomo	1	Sutter County	95953	
Lompico	1	Santa Cruz County	95018	
Lompoc	1	Santa Barbara County	93436	
Lompoc North	1	Santa Barbara County		
Lompoc Northwest	1	Santa Barbara County		
London	1	Tulare County	93618	
Lone Pine	1	Inyo County	93545	
Lone Pine Rancheria	1	Inyo County	95804	
Lone Star	1	Fresno County		
Lone Star	1	Glenn County		
Lone Wolf Colony	1	San Bernardino County		
Long Barn	1	Tuolumne County	95335	
Long Beach	1	Los Angeles County	90801	53
Long Beach Airport	1	Los Angeles County	90808	
Long Beach Naval Regional Medical Center	1	Los Angeles County	90822	
Long Beach Naval Shipyard	1	Los Angeles County	90822	
Long Beach Naval Station	1	Los Angeles County	90822	
Longvale	1	Mendocino County	95490	
Longview	1	Los Angeles County	93553	
Longville	1	Plumas County		
Lonoak	1	Monterey County	93930	
Lonoke	1	Santa Clara County	95020	
Lookout	1	Modoc County		
Lookout	1	Modoc County	96054	
Lookout Rancheria	1	Modoc County	96054	
Loomis	1	Placer County	95650	
Loomis Corners	1	Shasta County	96001	
Loop	1	Los Angeles County	90280	
Loope	1	Alpine County		
Loraine	1	Kern County	93518	
Loree Estates	1	Santa Clara County	95014	
Lorenzo	1	Alameda County	94580	
Lort	1	Tulare County		
Los Alamitos	1	Orange County	90720	
Los Alamitos Junction	1	Orange County		
Los Alamitos Naval Air Station	1	Orange County	90720	
Los Alamos	1	Santa Barbara County	93440	
Los Altos	1	Santa Clara County	94022	
Los Altos Hills	1	Santa Clara County	94022	
Los Altos Terrace	1	Los Angeles County		
Los Amigos	1	Los Angeles County	90242	
Los Angeles	1	Los Angeles County	90001	99
Los Angeles Air Force Station	1	Los Angeles County	90009	
Los Angeles International Airport	1	Los Angeles County	90009	
Los Angeles Naval Support Activity	1	Los Angeles County	90822	
Los Banos	1	Merced County	93635	
Los Berros	1	San Luis Obispo County	93420	
Los Carneros	1	Napa County	94559	
Los Cerritos	1	Los Angeles County		
Los Coyotes Indian Reservation	1	San Diego County	92263	
Los Deltos	1	Fresno County	93622	
Los Feliz	1	Los Angeles County	90027	
Los Gatos	1	Santa Clara County	95030	
Los Molinos	1	Tehama County	96055	
Los Nietos	1	Los Angeles County	90606	
Los Nietos Junction	1	Los Angeles County		
Los Olivos	1	Santa Barbara County	93441	
Los Osos	1	San Luis Obispo County	93402	
Los Padres	1	San Luis Obispo County	93401	
Los Posas Park	1	Ventura County	93010	
Los Ranchitos	1	Marin County	94903	
Los Robles	1	Tehama County		
Los Serranos	1	San Bernardino County	91709	
Lost City	1	Calaveras County		
Los Terrentos	1	San Diego County		
Lost Hills	1	Kern County	93249	
Lost Lake	1	Riverside County	92225	
Los Trancos Woods	1	San Mateo County	94026	
Los Tules	1	San Diego County		
Lotus	1	El Dorado County	95651	
Lovelock	1	Butte County		
Lowell	1	Napa County		
Lower Forni	1	El Dorado County		
Lower Lake	1	Lake County	95457	
Lower Town	1	Mono County		
Lowrey	1	Tehama County		
Loyalton	1	Sierra County	96118	
Loyola	1	Santa Clara County	94022	
Loyola Corners	1	Santa Clara County		
Lucas Valley	1	Marin County	94903	
Lucas Valley-Marinwood	1	Marin County		
Lucca	1	Tulare County		
Lucerne	1	Lake County	95458	
Lucerne Valley	1	San Bernardino County	92356	
Lucia	1	Monterey County	93920	
Ludlow	1	San Bernardino County	92338	
Lugo	1	Los Angeles County	90023	
Lugo	1	San Bernardino County		
Lumer	1	Tulare County		
Lumpkin	1	Butte County		
Lunada Bay	1	Los Angeles County	90275	
Lundy	1	Mono County	93541	
Lushmeadows Mountain Estates	1	Mariposa County	95338	
Luther	1	Santa Clara County		
Luther Burbank	1	Sonoma County	95402	
Luther Junction	1	Santa Clara County		
Lyla	1	Kern County		
Lynwood	1	Los Angeles County	90262	
Lynwood Gardens	1	Los Angeles County	90262	
Lynwood Hills	1	San Diego County	92010	
Lyonsville	1	Tehama County		
Lyoth	1	San Joaquin County		
Lytle Creek	1	San Bernardino County	92358	
Lytton	1	Sonoma County	95448	
