= Salt Fire (2021) =

2021 wildfire in Northern California

- Part of the 2021 California wildfires
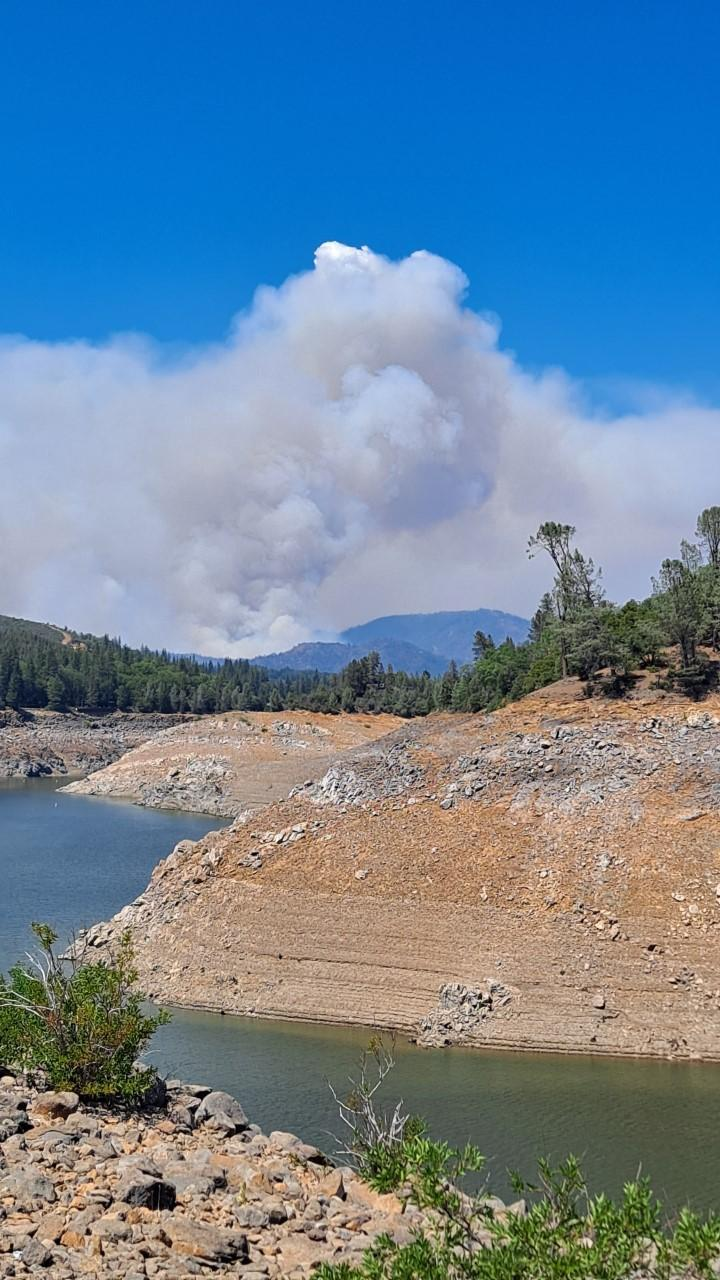
- Smoke column from the Salt Fire on Sunday, July 4, 2021
- Date: June 30, 2021 –; July 19, 2021
- Location: Shasta Lake, Shasta County, California
- Coordinates: 40.849°N 122.336°W

Statistics
- Burned area: 12,660 acres (5,123 ha)

Impacts
- Structures lost: 27 homes, 14 outbuildings destroyed; 4 outbuildings damaged

Map
- Location in Northern California

Location of Salt Fire

The Salt Fire was a wildfire that burned 12,660 acres (5,123 ha) in the Lakehead area north of Shasta Lake in Shasta County, California in the United States during the 2021 California wildfire season. The fire was first reported on Wednesday, June 30, 2021, and it was fully contained on July 19, 2021. The fire destroyed forty-one structures, including twenty-seven residences and fourteen outbuildings, and damaged four additional outbuildings. Although the cause remains under investigation, officials from the Shasta–Trinity National Forest believe that the fire was likely sparked by hot material that fell from a vehicle on Interstate 5 and landed in dry brush next to the freeway.

== Progression ==
The fire was first reported in the early afternoon of Wednesday, June 30, at around 1:40 pm PST burning east of Interstate 5 in the Gilman Road area near the Salt Creek exit and immediately caused a shutdown of the freeway as the fire rapidly expanded. Rural neighborhoods in the surrounding areas were placed under mandatory evacuation orders as the fire reportedly exploded to over 200 acres by 3:25 pm. Exacerbated by a protracted heatwave that remained over the Pacific Northwest, the abnormally dry native brush created by significant drought conditions allowed for critical fire spread on the Salt Fire as several other severe wildfires had ignited throughout the northern California area during the week—including the nearby Lava and Tennant Fires. In the early hours of the fire, residents on Gregory Creek Road were urged to shelter in place or go to Gregory Creek Beach to shelter in-place. By 6:30 pm, the fire had been estimated to be around 1,000 acres and remained zero percent contained as it burned north and east into unincorporated forestland.

On the following day of Thursday, July 1, investigators suggested that the cause of the fire had been attributed to a vehicle that had been traveling north on Interstate 5. Existing evacuation orders remained in place as the fire's size had expanded to encompass some estimated 4,500 acres by 6 pm. At that point, firefighting personnel remained in the initial attack phase of the response and had not begun to assess containment of the fire, nor the extent of the structure damage caused by the fire.

Throughout the following days, the fire would burn deeper into the forest north and east of Lakehead and eventually begin to move into the footprints of wildfires that had burned in the area several years prior. These fires included the two significant incidents dubbed the Hirz Fire and Delta Fire which had scarred the area during the fire season of 2018. Although Interstate 5 was reopened by the morning of July 1, the fire grew significantly in size over the next several days, reaching over 11,693 acres (4,732 ha) by July 5. Firefighters prioritized securing the west side of the fire by building containment lines near the Interstate in order to keep the freeway open. The fire reached full containment on July 19.

== Effects ==
=== Closures and evacuations ===
Residents living east of the I-5 freeway in the Lakehead area were forced to evacuate due to the fire, including people living along Gilman Road, Gregory Creek Road, and Antlers Road. An evacuation center was set up at Central Valley High School in Shasta Lake.

The fire forced the shutdown of Interstate 5 shortly after the fire was first reported on June 30, although by the next day both directions of the freeway were open. Numerous roads around Lakehead were closed, and as the fire expanded on the east side of the freeway, the area of the Shasta–Trinity National Forest surrounding the fire was closed to recreation to protect public safety.

=== Damage ===
The Salt Fire destroyed 41 structures, including 27 residences and 14 outbuildings. It also damaged an additional four outbuildings. A number of homes along Gregory Creek Road were destroyed by the morning after the fire started, giving residents only minimal time to escape the expanding fire.

== Gallery ==
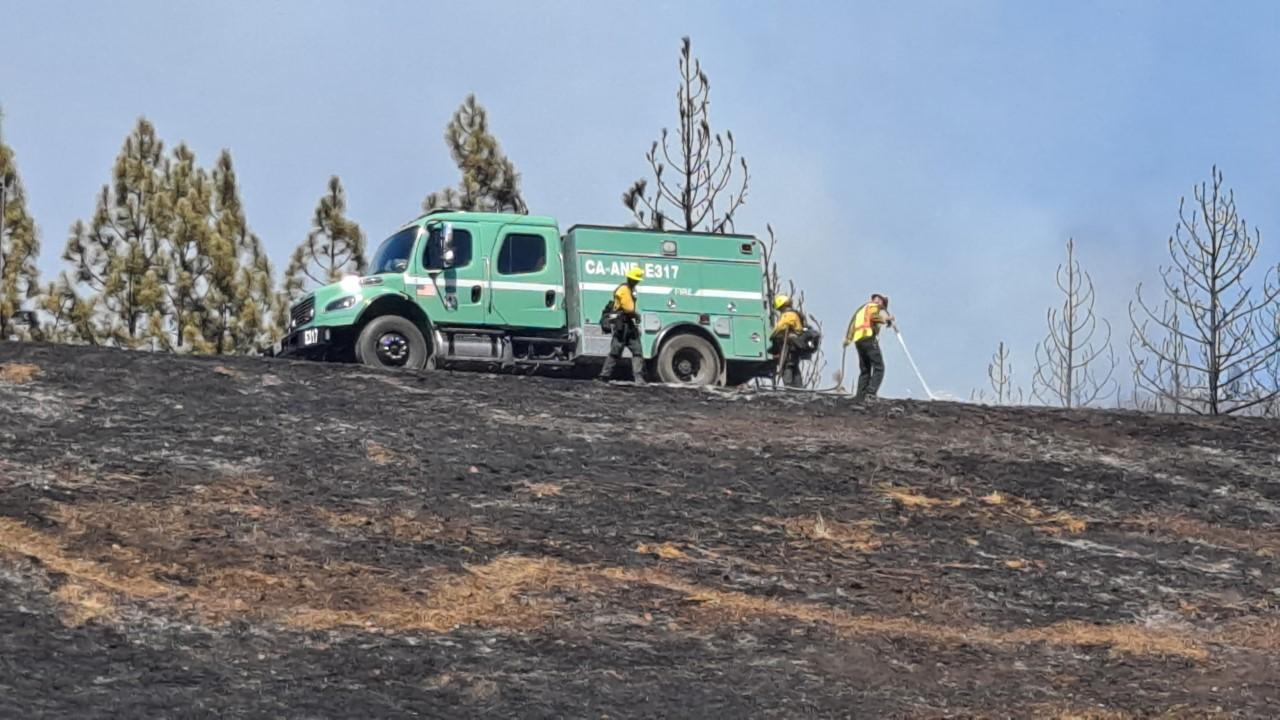
Fire crews implement mop up along I-5 on July 2, 2021

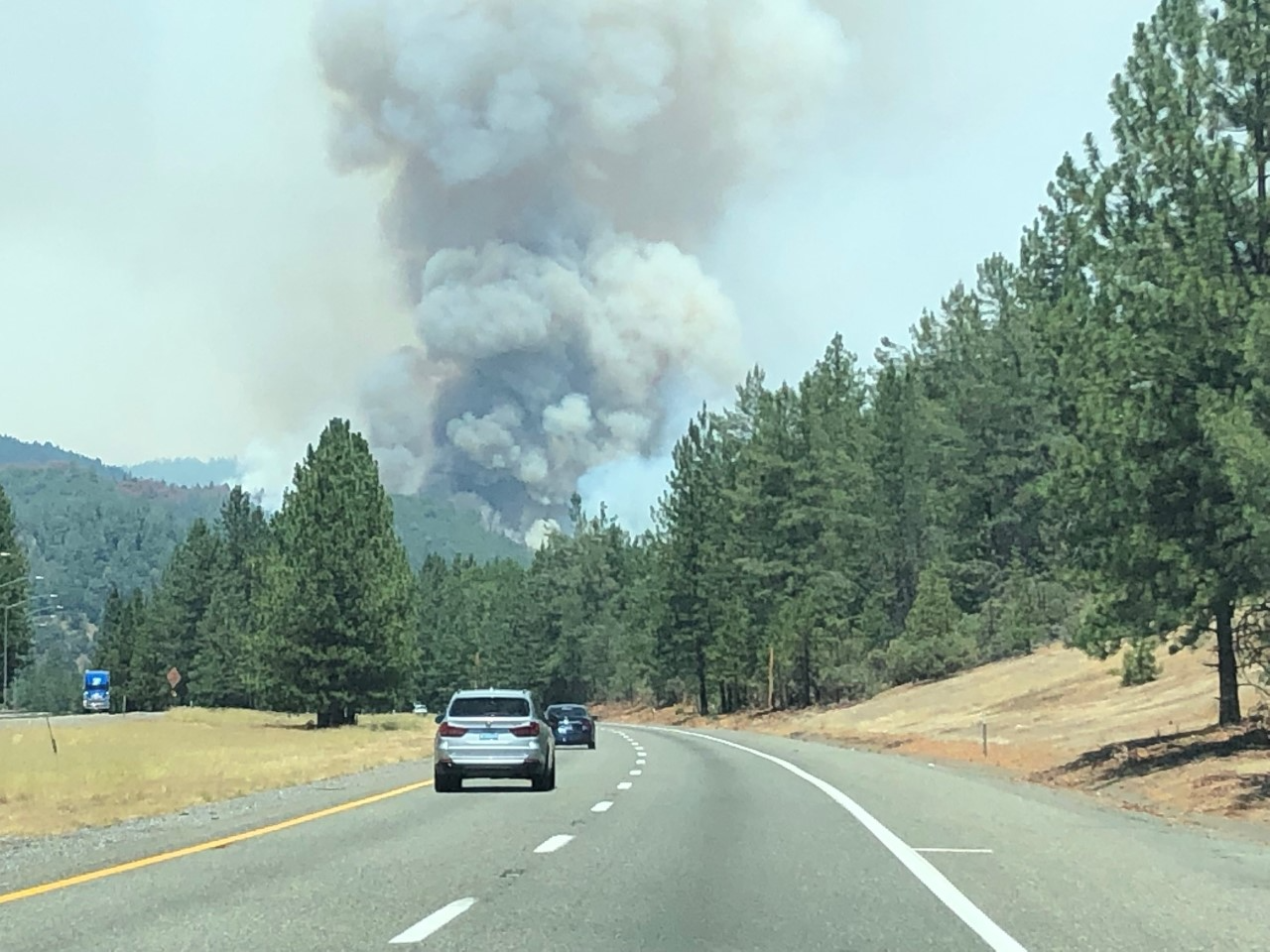
A smoke plume as seen on the west side of the fire as seen from I-5 on July 3, 2021

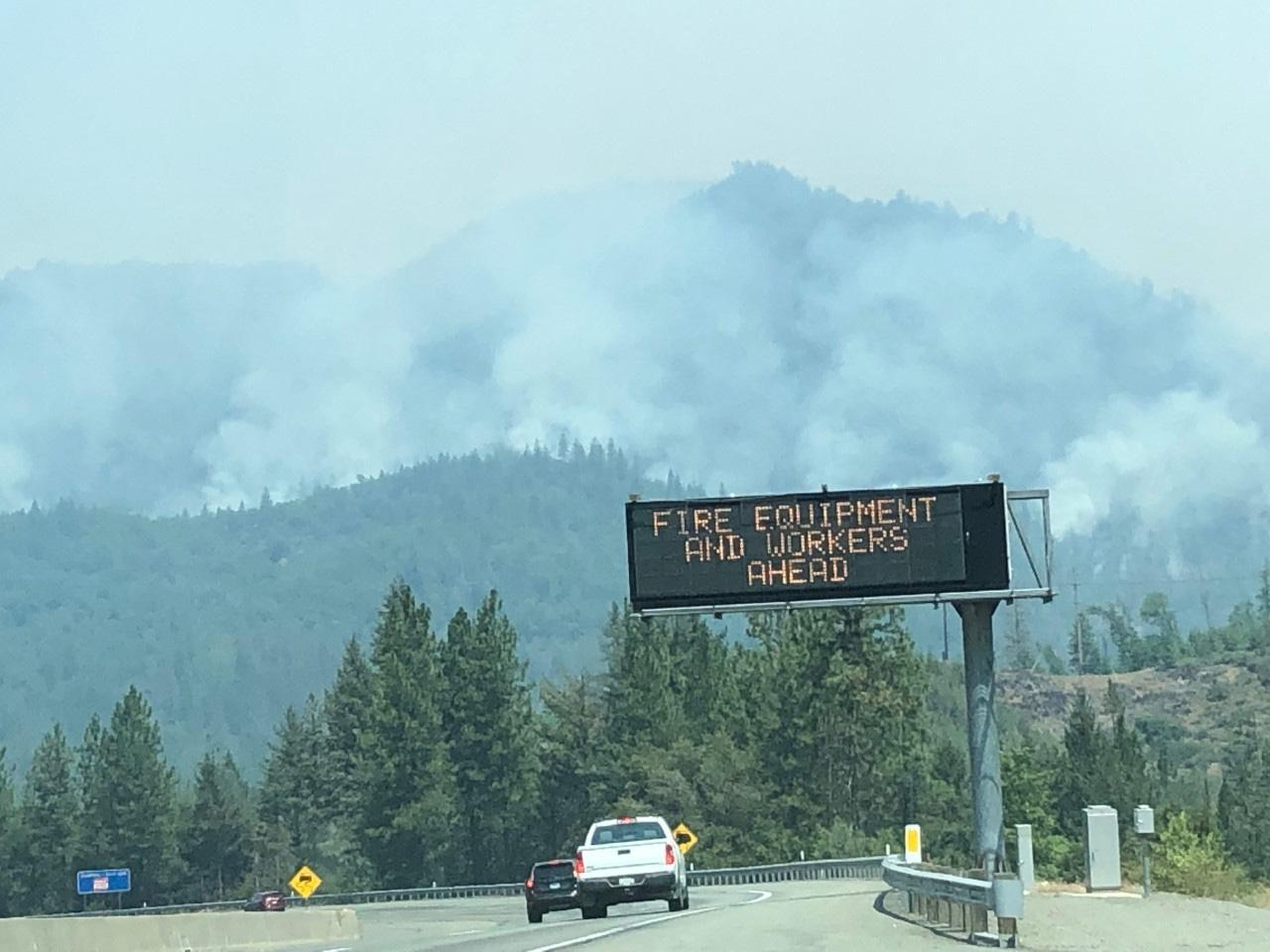
Salt Fire backing down the mountain near Gilman Rd. as seen from I-5 on July 4, 2021

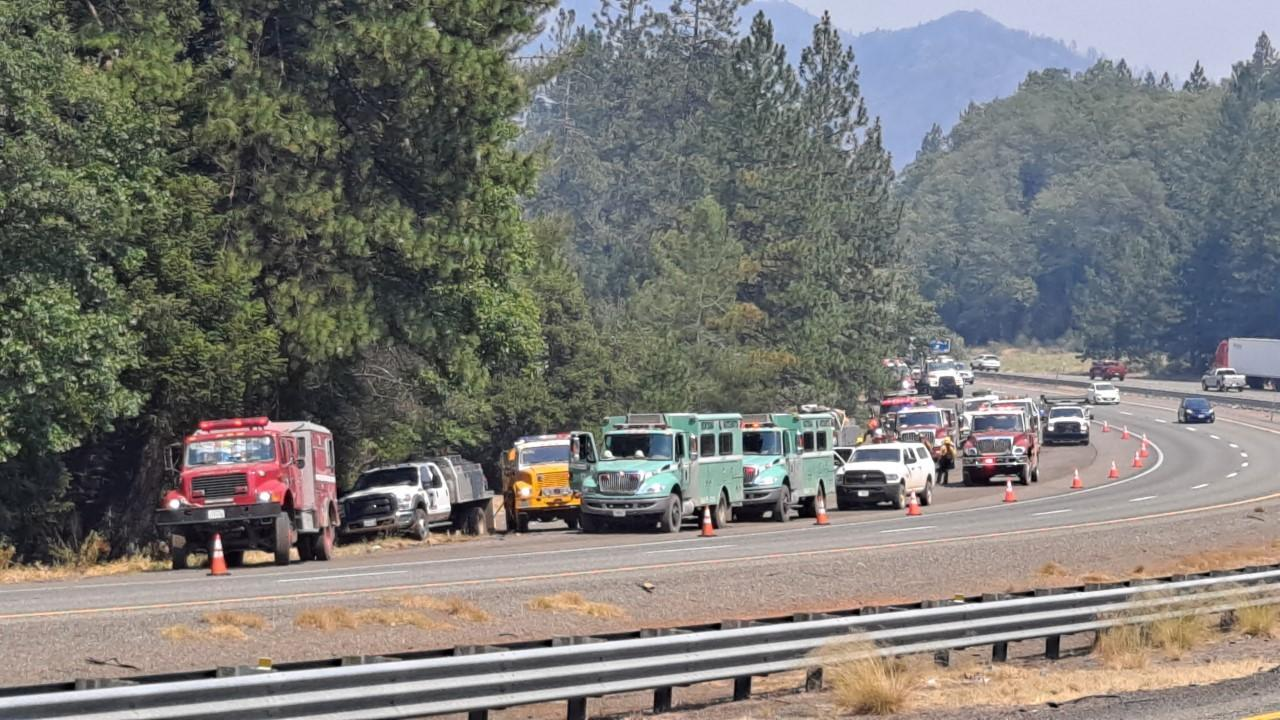
Various engines parked along I-5 fighting the Salt Fire on July 5, 2021

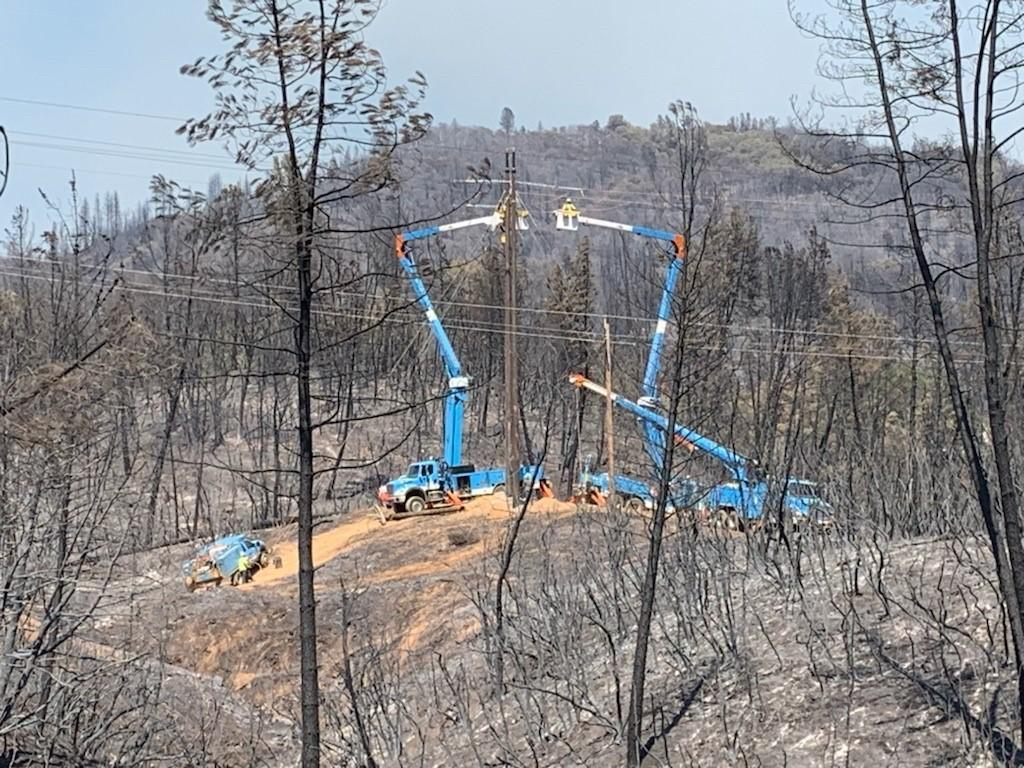
PG&E works to restore power on July 6, 2021

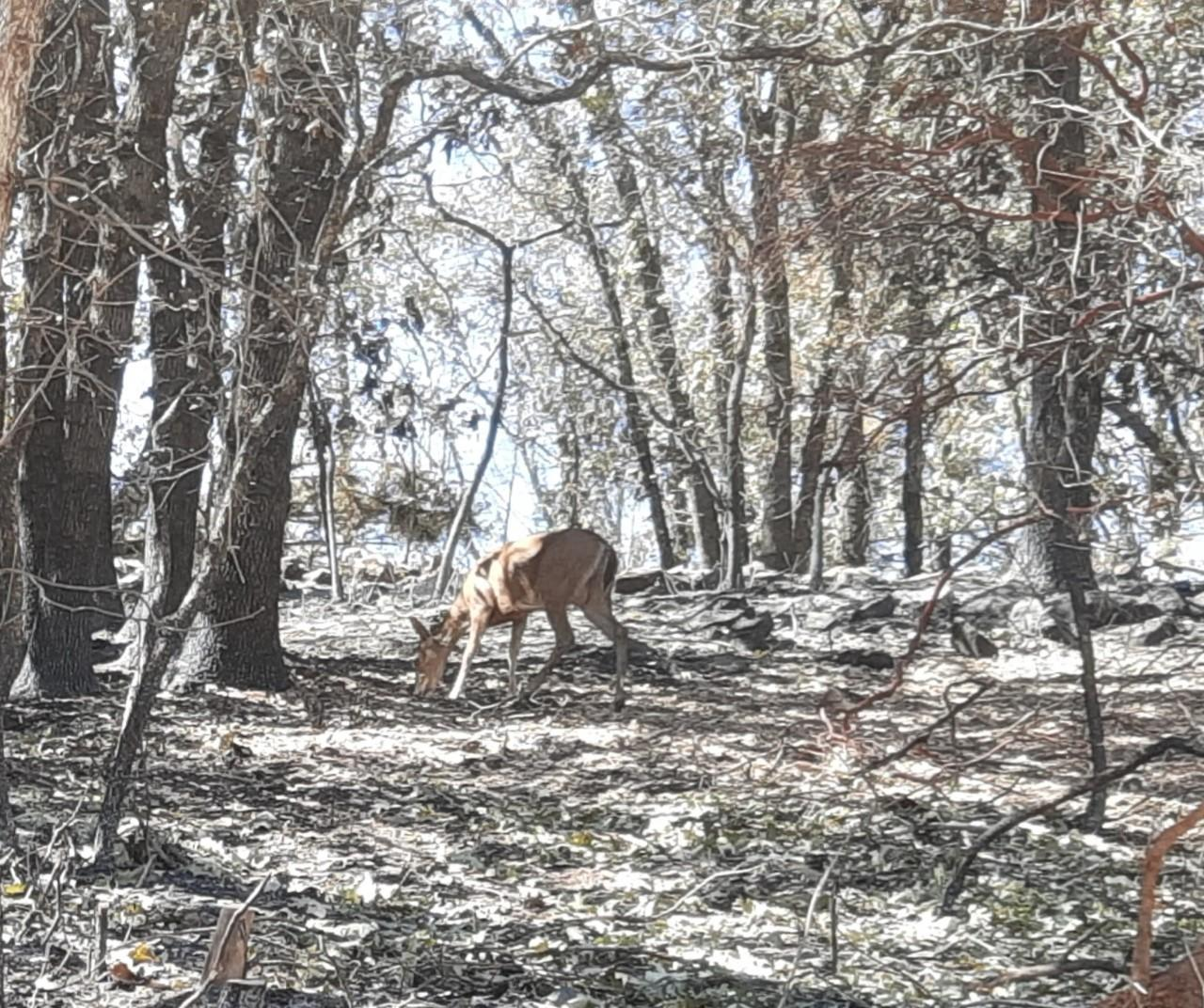
A deer returns to graze in the burn area on July 7, 2021

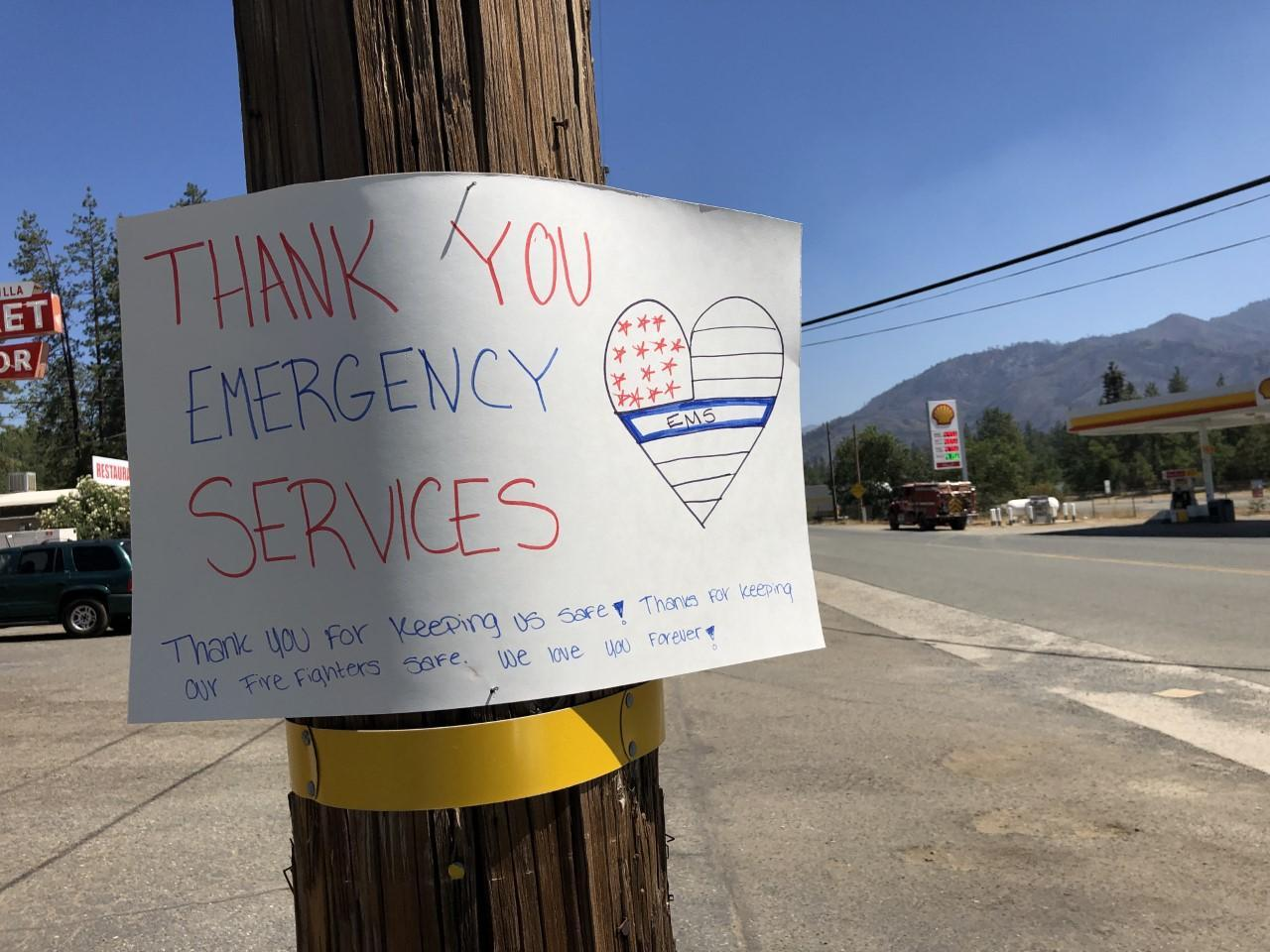
Thank you sign for first responders in Lakehead on July 9, 2021

== See also ==
- 2021 California wildfires
