= Kulaiapto, California =

Kulaiapto is a former Maidu settlement in Butte County, California, United States. It was located between Feather Falls and Tsuka; its precise location is unknown.
