= Susanville Railroad Depot =

- U.S. National Register of Historic Places
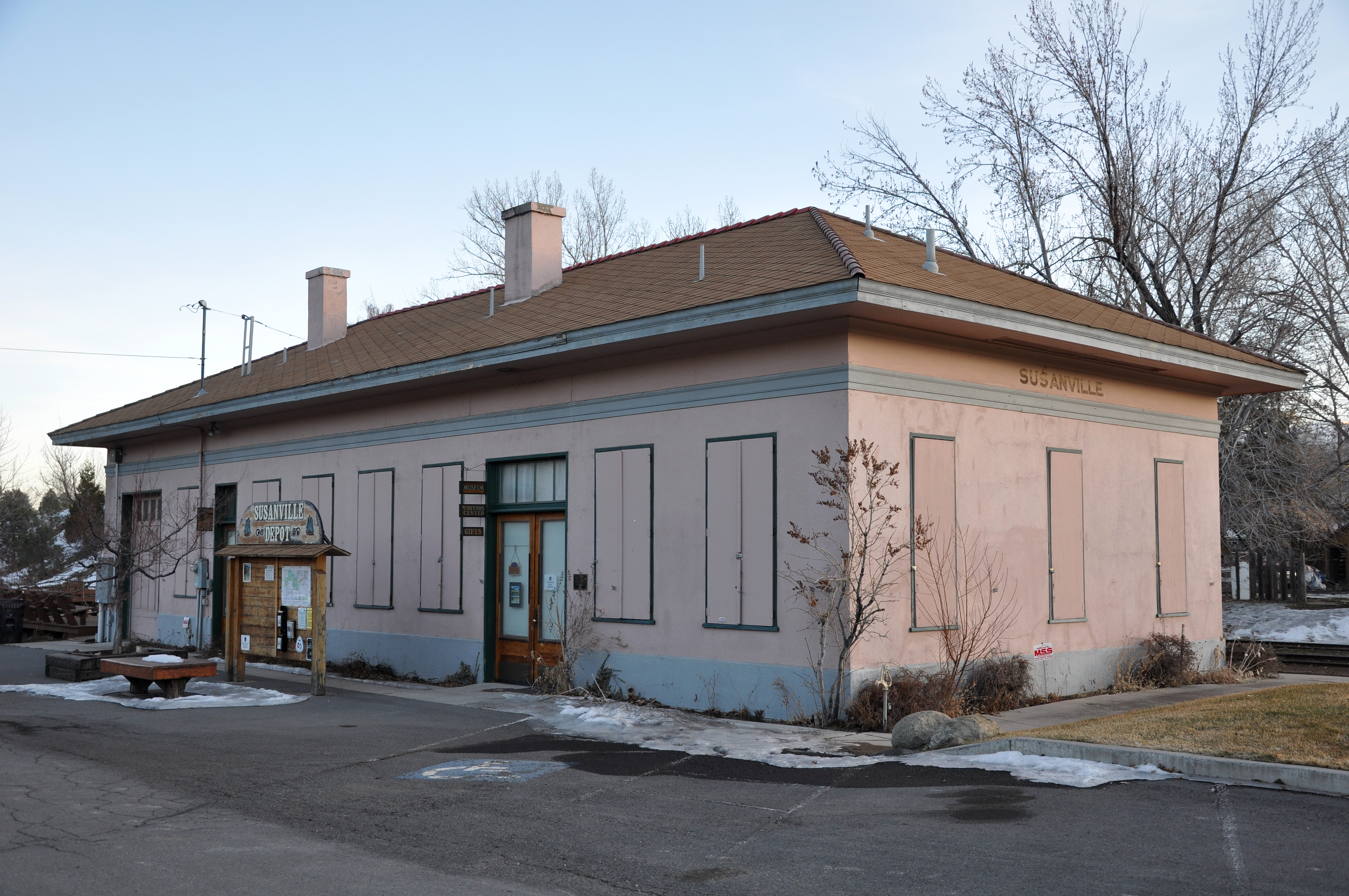
- the depot in February 2013

- Location within California
- Location: 461 Richmond Rd., Susanville, California
- Coordinates: 40°24′40.6794″N 120°39′35.9994″W
- Area: 1.4 acres (0.57 ha)
- Built: 1927
- NRHP reference No.: 01000332
- Added to NRHP: April 5, 2001

The Susanville Railroad Depot is a National Register of Historic Places property in Lassen County, California in the city of Susanville. Originally constructed for the Fernley and Lassen Railway (a Southern Pacific Railroad subsidiary) in 1927 to replace an existing station building, it was closed in 1979, and in 1987 it was saved from being burnt by the fire department (as a training exercise) after local protests, being purchased instead by the Lassen Land and Trails Trust, which uses it for their office as well as maintaining a small museum.

== Description ==
The station building sits on a 1.3 acre property bought from the Southern Pacific Transportation Company in November 1988. It is 72.5 feet (22.1 m) by 20 feet (6.1 m), with a bay window projecting from the center of the South side facing the abandoned railbed. It is a single story stuccoed structure on a concrete foundation under a hipped roof. The exterior is little changed, with double-hung sash windows and wooden doors; the primary change is the removal of the original gutters.

The interior was originally divided into three areas, with a waiting room (including lavatories and a phone booth) at the West end, a ticket office in the center (separated from the waiting area by a counter), and at the east end, the express office, which had its own sliding doors on both the track side and the street side of the building. Another counter and a partition separated the ticketing from the express area, so that there was a short hallway from the latter to the waiting room. The original floor was linoleum, the walls pine tongue-and-groove wainscotting with decorative moldings. Other furnishings were also pine, with brass hardware.

In the 1950s, the counter on the passenger side of the ticket office was removed, and part of the express room was partitioned off and had its ceiling lowered, with the effect of eliminating the hallway as well. Renovation undid much of this, as well as involving the replacement of damaged fixtures and the installation of a new furnace and a security system. The linoleum was replaced with a painted pattern on the floor. A redwood deck was added at the East end, the parking lot was paved, and the area landscaped with native plants. A section of the original track remains on the south side of the station.

== History ==
The Fernley and Lassen Railway was constructed by the Southern Pacific in 1912–1914 to serve lumbering companies in Lassen County around Westwood, originating at the SP main line in Fernley, Nevada. Passing through Susanville, a depot was opened in a boxcar in April 1913, replaced in September of that year with a combination station/freight shed. By 1927 that facility was proving inadequate, and the current station building was built adjacent to the original station, providing new passenger facilities while the older building served freight and baggage storage only. Passenger service ended in 1933, a victim of the Great Depression, but freight use continued until 1956, when the line was washed out west of town at a trestle. It being uneconomic to repair, rail service ceased on the line, but the station remained in use for office space and storage until October 1979, upon the abandonment of the entire line. The station sat vacant and was vandalized, to the point where in 1987 it was offered to the fire department to be burnt in a training exercise. This sparked opposition, and a nonprofit was formed to purchase and maintain the building, which was renovated starting in 1993 and reopened the following year. In the meantime, the original 1913 structure burned in 1989, leaving the existing 1927 building standing alone.

The U.S. Forest Service awarded two Challenge Cost Share Grants totaling $88,584 for renovation of the interior and exterior of the building.

The depot now houses the Trust's offices as well as a museum. The Bizz Johnson Trail begins at the station and heads west along the old right-of-way. The trust hosts various events at the station including an annual "Rails to Trails" festival in the fall.

Preceding station	Southern Pacific Railroad	Following station
Westworth Junction toward Westwood	Fernley and Lassen	Leavitt toward Fernley
