= Vade, California =

Vade may refer to:

- Little Norway, California
- Phillips, California
