= Hokomo, California =

Former Maidu settlement in California

Hokomo is a former Maidu settlement in Butte County, California, United States. It was located on the east side of Middle Fork of the Feather River, almost due north of Mooretown (now Feather Falls); its precise location is unknown.

== See also ==
- Mooretown Rancheria of Maidu Indians
