= Holhoto, California =

Former Maidu settlement in California

Holhoto (also, Helto) is a former Maidu settlement in Butte County, California, United States. It was located a few miles south of Mooretown (now Feather Falls); its precise location is unknown.

== See also ==
- Mooretown Rancheria of Maidu Indians
