= Feather River (disambiguation) =

Feather River may refer to:

Rivers

- Feather River in California in the United States, a principal tributary of the Sacramento River
- Feather River (Alaska) in Alaska in the United States
- Feather River (Idaho) in Idaho in the United States

Other places

- Feather River, former name of Feather Falls, California

Transportation

- Feather River Route a rail line, much of which travels through the Feather River Canyon in California.
