= Little Norway (disambiguation) =

Little Norway may refer to:

- Little Norway, military base in Canada
- Little Norway, California
- Little Norway, Wisconsin
- Little Norway Park in Toronto, Canada
- Kharian, a town in Punjab, Pakistan sometimes called "Little Norway"
