= Lokoya =

Lokoya may refer to:

- Lokoya, California
- Lokoya people
- Lokoya language
