= Lingard =

Lingard is a surname. Notable people with the surname include:

- Alfred Lingard (1849–1938), British bacteriologist
- Grant Lingard (1961–1995), New Zealand artist
- Ivor Lingard (born 1942), English rugby league footballer
- Jesse Lingard (born 1992), English footballer
- Joan Lingard (1932–2022), Scottish writer
- John Lingard (1771–1851), English historian and Roman Catholic priest
- Kevin Lingard (born 1942), Australian politician
- William Lingard (1839–1927), American comic singer

== See also ==
- Lingard, California, unincorporated community
- The Killer (Wilson novel), 1970 Colin Wilson novel published in the U.S. as Lingard
