= Lakehead =

Lakehead can refer to:

== Geographic ==
- The head of Lake Superior (and of the Great Lakes), typically referring to the Thunder Bay–Duluth region
- Lakehead, California, a census-designated place
- Lakehead-Lakeshore, California, a former census-designated place

== Education ==
- Lakehead University in Thunder Bay, Ontario

== Pipelines ==
- Lakehead Pipeline, in both Canada and the United States
