= Moresville =

Moresville may refer to:

- Moresville, California, now called Feather Falls
- Moresville, New York now called Grand Gorge
