= Coppervale, California =

Unincorporated community in California, United States

Coppervale Copper Vale
- Unincorporated community
- Location in California Coppervale (the United States)
- Coordinates: 40°20′48″N 120°54′18″W
- Country: United States
- State: California
- County: Lassen
- Elevation: 5,203 ft (1,586 m)

Coppervale (formerly, Copper Vale) is an unincorporated community in Lassen County, California, United States. It is located 6 miles (9.7 km) east-northeast of Westwood, at an elevation of 5203 feet (1586 m). Its name is derived from the early copper mining activity that once took place.

The Copper Vale post office first operated from May 24, 1864 to 1867 with Carolyn C. Goodrich as the town's first postmistress. After nearly a year in hiatus, the post office reopened in 1868 until 1886, and from 1890 to 1894 when it changed its name to Coppervale. The Coppervale post office moved in 1901 two miles to the northeast and was closed for good on June 30, 1914.
