= Goumaz, California =

Goumaz
- Former settlement
- Location in California
- Coordinates: 40°24′50″N 120°51′45″W
- Country: United States
- State: California
- County: Lassen
- Elevation: 5,203 ft (1,586 m)

Goumaz (also, Goumez) is a former rail station and settlement in Lassen County, California, United States, where a campground is now located. It was located on the Southern Pacific Railroad, 10.5 miles (17 km) northeast of Westwood, at an elevation of 5203 feet (1586 m).

It is likely named for Philip J. Goumaz, who came to California and Lassen County in the 1860s.

The Fernley and Lassen Railway line along which the Goumaz station was located was built in 1912–14. The Goumaz station was completed as a water stop in 1913. In July 1917, a train car body was used as a living quarters for railroad employees assigned to Goumaz. By the next summer, seven railroad owned structures were on site. Two more tie houses were added in 1923, when a fence was also added around the section house because of the young families with children now living there. The buildings were taken down in 1957 after the local section forces stopped being used by the railroad.

The Fernley and Lassen Railway was abandoned in 1978, and the section along which the Goumaz station was located is now part of the Bizz Johnson rail trail. The Goumaz campground is now located there within the Lassen National Forest.
