= Delta Fire =

2018 wildfire in Northern California

- Part of the 2018 California wildfires
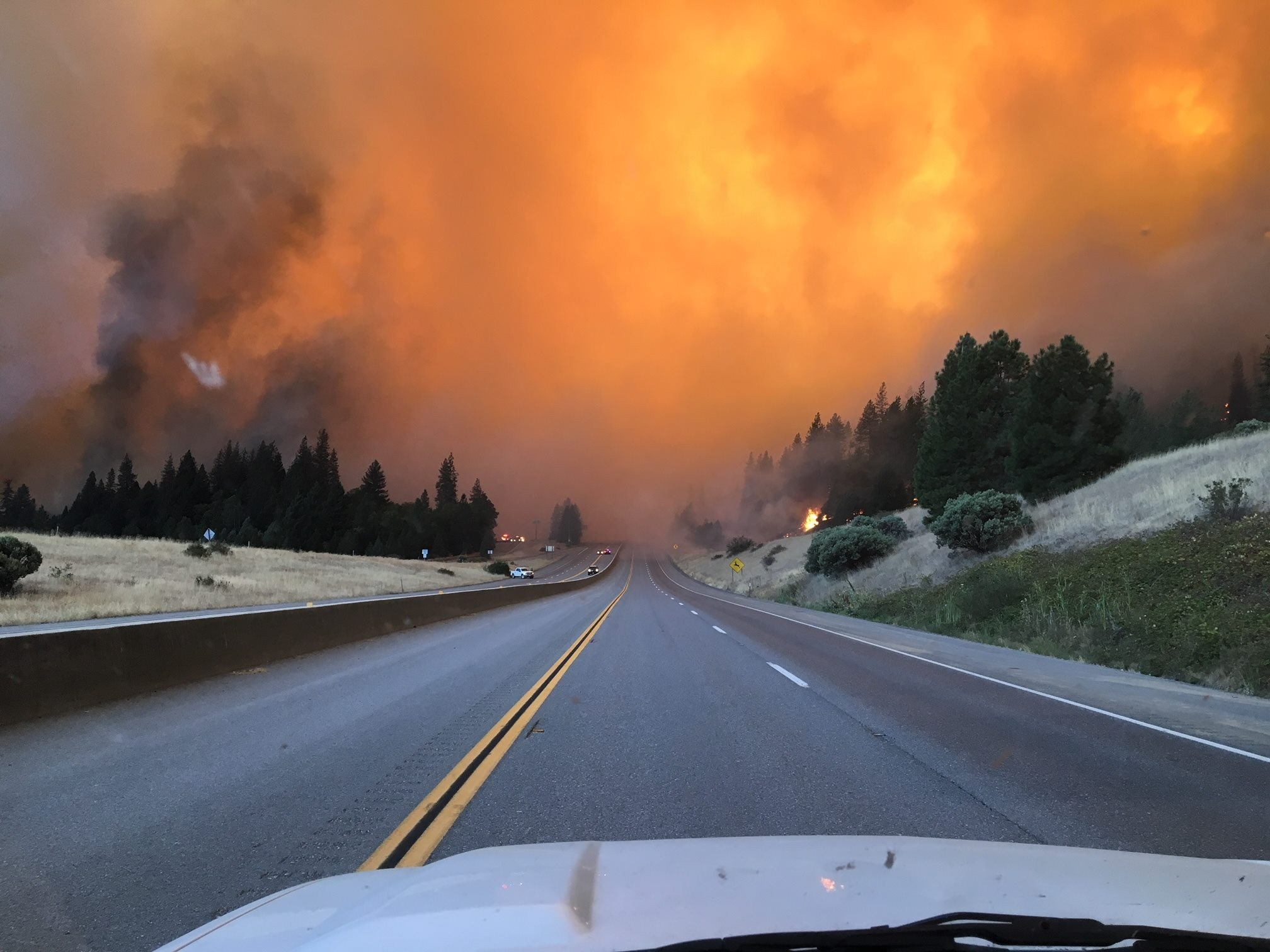
- The Delta Fire as it closed of Interstate 5
- Date: September 5, 2018 –; October 7, 2018
- Location: Shasta National Forest, California, United States
- Coordinates: 40.891°N 122.228°W

Statistics
- Burned area: 63,311 acres (256 km^{2})

Impacts
- Deaths: None reported
- Injuries: 2
- Structures destroyed: 42 structures
- Cost: Unknown

Ignition
- Cause: Human related

Map
- The fire's location in Northern California

The Delta Fire was a 2018 wildfire that burned near Lakehead, California, in the Shasta National Forest. The fire burned 63,311 acres (256 km^{2}) and destroyed 20 structures, before it was 100% contained on October 7, 2018. The fire burned into the western flank of the nearby Hirz Fire on September 10, and also burned only a couple of miles away from the enormous Carr Fire, the seventh-most destructive fire in Californian history.

== Progression ==
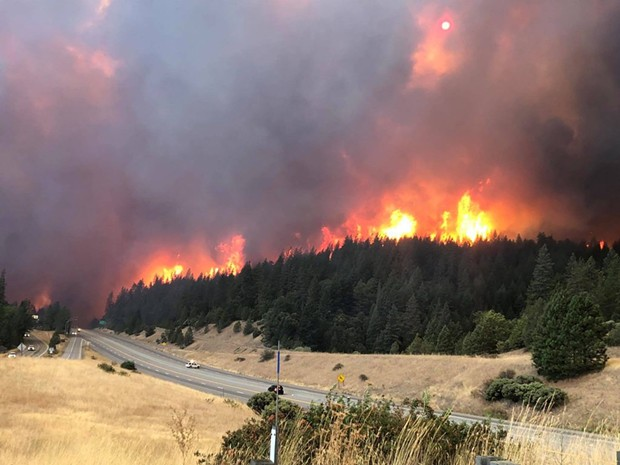
The Delta Fire in Shasta County, California resulted in the closure of Interstate 5.

The Delta Fire ignited on September 5, 2018, at approximately 12:51 pm PDT, 2 miles north of Lakehead, California. The fire rapidly grew in size, crossing over Interstate 5 between Lakehead, California, and Castella, California, which forced the interstate to be shut down from September 5 to September 10. On September 10, the fire merged with the nearby Hirz Fire to the east, and by September 11, the fire was only a few miles away from burning into the already-contained Carr Fire to the southwest.

On September 12, the Delta Fire reached 57,253 acres (232 km^{2}) and was only 17% contained. On September 13, the northern flank of the fire flared up again and shut down Interstate 5 again for six hours during the afternoon. During the next few days, the Delta Fire continued to grow in size, albeit at a slow rate, while firefighters continued making progress on containing the wildfire, with the fire reaching 60,277 acres (243.93 km^{2}) and 76% containment by September 17. On September 18, firefighters had contained most of the Delta Fire's northern flank, while flames on the fire's southwestern flank continued to spread, nearly reaching the Carr Fire's burn area. Late on September 19, the Delta Fire had grown to 60,592 acres (245.21 km^{2}), while containment increased to 88%, with the southwestern flank of the wildfire being the only active portion of the fire. On September 24, the Delta Fire had grown to 60,751 acres (245.85 km^{2}), while containment increased to 98%.

On September 25, a spot fire broke out in Bear Gulch, outside of the southwestern perimeter of the Delta Fire, which quickly reached 1,000 acres (4.0 km^{2}) by the next morning. On September 27, a second, smaller spot fire had broken out to the south of the larger spot fire, situated south of Damnation Creek, which was estimated at 14 acres (0.057 km^{2}). The first spot fire continued to spread uncontained, while the main body of the Delta Fire was contained; by September 29, the first spot fire had exceeded 2,376 acres (9.62 km^{2}) in size, increasing the total burn area of the Delta Fire to 63,093 acres (255.33 km^{2}), and dropping the overall containment of the Delta Fire to 97%. The spot fires were at 0% containment. On September 30, the Delta Fire expanded to 63,293 acres (256.14 km^{2}), with containment remaining at 97%. The fire did not experience any further growths for the next several days, while containment generally remained at 97% up until October 5. Afterward, the Delta Fire experienced another small growth, increasing to 63,311 acres (256.21 km^{2}). On October 7, the Delta Fire was fully contained, without any further increases in size.

The fire was determined to be man-made, although the exact cause remains unclear. On May 5, 2021, Shasta County District Attorney, Stephanie A. Bridgett announced that a Cynthia Ann LeRoux had been arrested and faces charges for starting the Delta Fire.

== Growth and containment ==
Video from the US Forest Service about the Delta / Herz fires

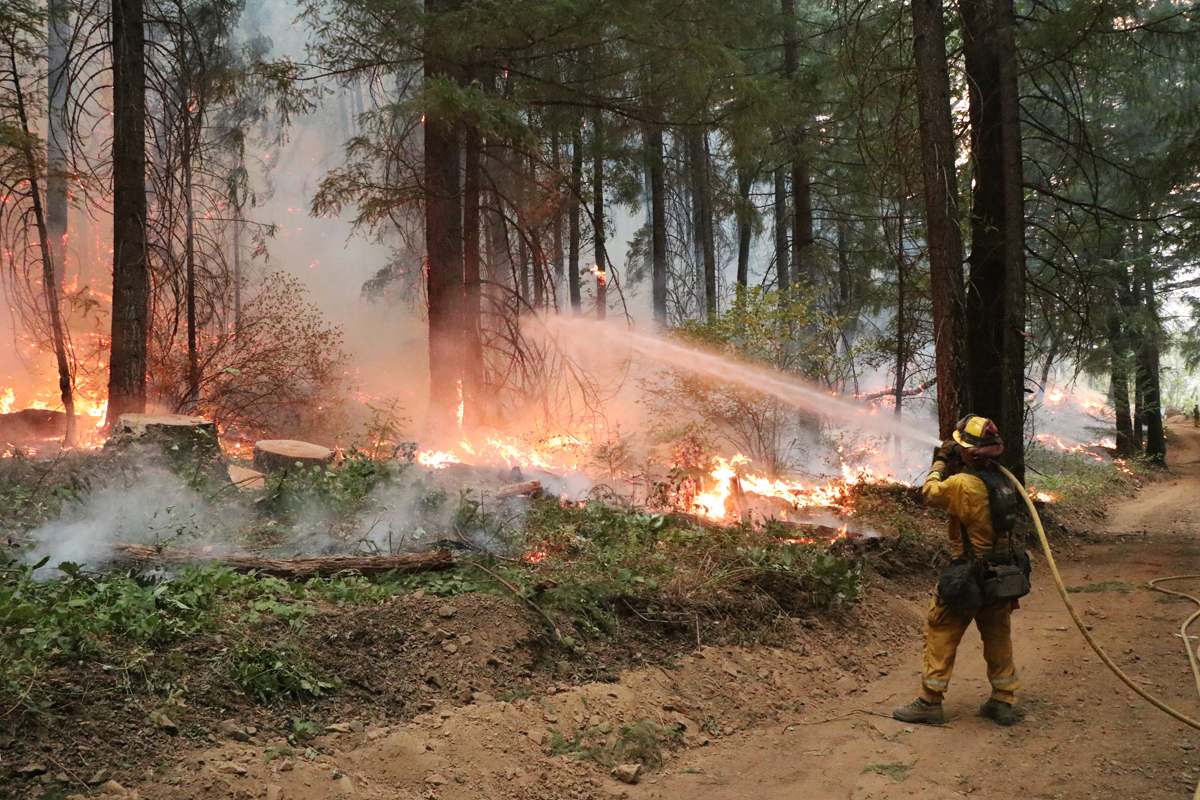
Fire suppression efforts on September 14

Fire containment status Gray: contained; Red: active; %: percent contained;
Date	Area burned acres (hectares)	Containment
Sept 5	5,000 (2,023)	
Sept 6	22,000 (8,903)	
Sept 7	31,325 (12,677)	
Sept 8	40,580 (16,422)	
Sept 9	47,110 (19,065)	
Sept 10	49,874 (20,183)	
Sept 11	53,837 (21,787)	
Sept 12	57,233 (23,161)	
Sept 13	60,018 (24,288)	
Sept 14	60,018 (24,288)	
Sept 15	60,018 (24,288)	
Sept 16	60,018 (24,288)	
Sept 17	60,277 (24,393)	
Sept 18	60,277 (24,393)	
Sept 19	60,592 (24,521)	
Sept 20	60,681 (24,557)	
Sept 21	60,705 (24,566)	
Sept 22	60,748 (24,584)	
Sept 23	60,748 (24,584)	
Sept 24	60,751 (24,585)	
Sept 25	60,779 (24,596)	
Sept 26	61,715 (24,975)	
Sept 28	62,159 (25,155)	
Sept 29	63,093 (25,533)	
Sept 30–Oct 5	63,293 (25,614)	
Oct 6	---	---
Oct 7	63,311 (25,621)	

== See also ==
- 2018 California wildfires
  - Carr Fire
  - Hirz Fire
