= EMD SW900 =

Model of 900 hp American diesel switcher

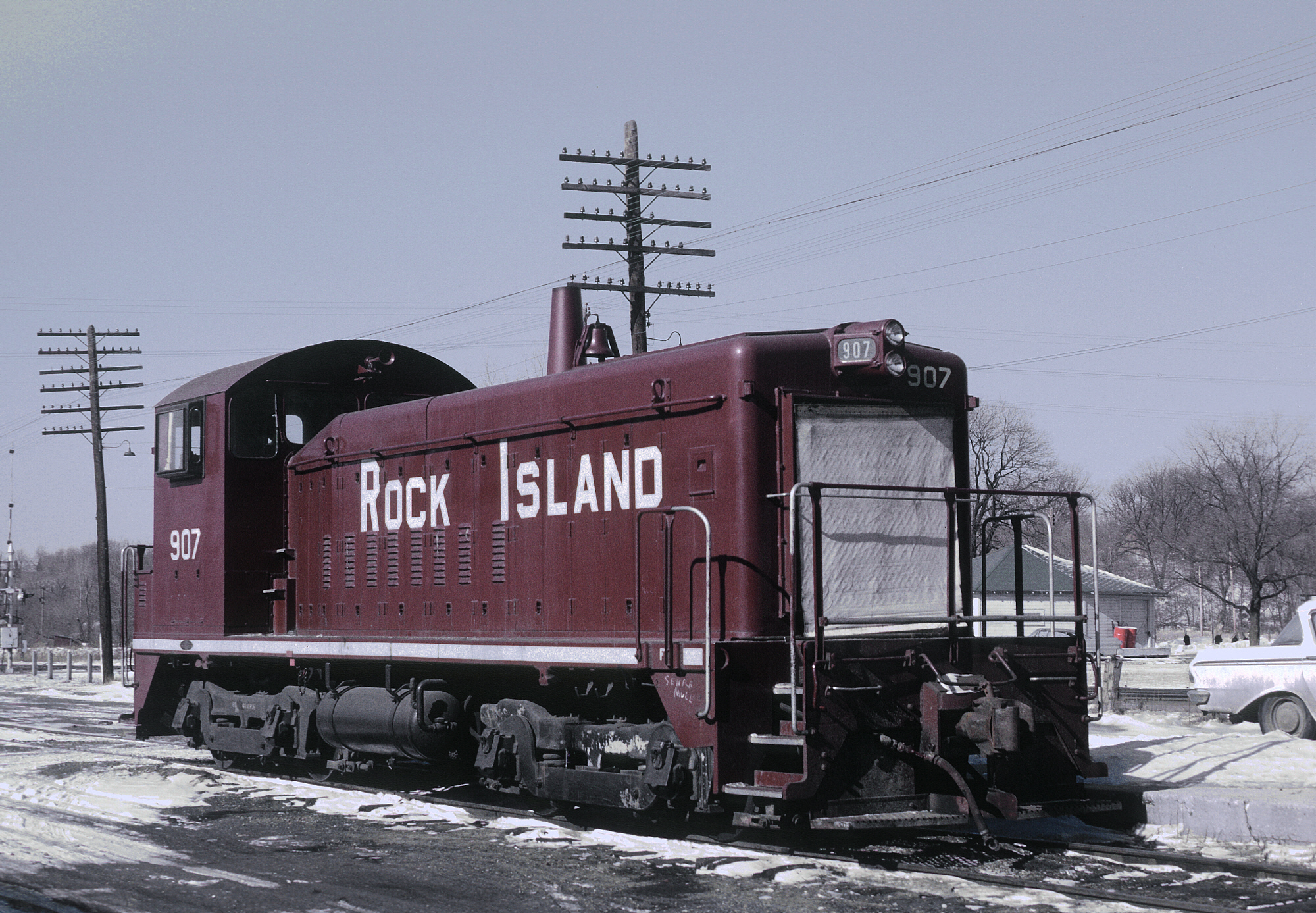
- Rock Island 907 at Seneca, Illinois on January 28, 1967
Type and origin
- Power type: Diesel–electric
- Builder: General Motors’ Electro-Motive Division (EMD); General Motors Diesel (GMD), Canada
- Model: SW900
- Build date: December 1953 – March 1969
- Total produced: EMD: 274; GMD: 97
Specifications
- Configuration
  - AAR: B-B
  - UIC: Bo'Bo'
- Prime mover: EMD 8-567C
- Engine type: V8 Two-stroke diesel
- Aspiration: Roots-type supercharger
- Cylinders: 8
Performance figures
- Power output: 900 hp (670 kW)
Career
- Locale: North America; South America; Africa

The EMD SW900 is a diesel switcher locomotive built by General Motors Electro-Motive Division and General Motors Diesel (GMD) between December 1953 and March 1969.

Built concurrently with the SW1200, the eight-cylinder SW900 model had a single exhaust stack, and replaced the EMD SW8 model in EMD's catalogue. Power was provided by an EMD 567C 8-cylinder engine that generated 900 horsepower (670 kW). The "900" model number reflected EMD's change to a more horsepower-based naming system at the time. The last two SW900s built by GMD for British Columbia Hydro were built with 8 cylinder 645E engines rated at 1,000 horsepower (750 kW).

260 examples of this locomotive model were built for American railroads and 97 were built for Canadian railroads. Canadian production of the SW900 lasted three and a half years past EMD production. Seven units were exported to Orinoco Mining Co (Venezuela); two units were exported to Southern Peru Copper Co; and five units were exported to the Liberian American-Swedish Minerals Company. Total production is 371 units.

Some SW900s were built with the generators from traded in EMC Winton-engined switchers and were classified as SW900M by EMD. Units rebuilt from SW or SC model locomotives developed 600 or 660 horsepower with the older generators instead of the full 900 horsepower of the SW900.

In the early 1960s, the Reading Company sent 14 of their Baldwin VO 1000 model switchers to EMD to have them rebuilt to SW900 specifications. The Reading units retained the Baldwin switcher carbody and were rated at 1000 horsepower by EMD.

A cow–calf variation, the TR9, was cataloged, but none were built.

== Rebuilds ==
=== SW900E ===
In 1974, the Southern Pacific Transportation Company had decided to rebuild all ten of their EMD SW900 diesel locomotives at their own Houston Shops.

The rebuilds included the installation of a 12-cylinder EMD 645E engine, which increased the horsepower from 900 hp (670 kW) to 1,200 hp (890 kW).

The rebuilds had also included the installation of a new electrical system, which included a newer generator, newer traction motors, and a newer control system. The rebuilds were done specifically to extend the life of the locomotives and to increase their power and reliability.

== Original buyers ==
=== Built by Electro-Motive Division, USA ===
Railroad	Quantity	Road numbers	Notes
Electro-Motive Division demonstrator	1	6534	to River Terminal 99
Electro-Motive Division demonstrator	1	6535	to Waterloo Railway 4
Alabama By-Products Corporation	1	900	
American Steel and Wire	4	3–6	
Armco Steel Corporation	13	B80, 1203–1214	
Atchison, Topeka and Santa Fe Railway	4	650–653	
Baltimore and Ohio Railroad	29	625–653	
Birmingham Southern Railroad	5	91–95	
General Motors-Buick Motor Division	2	792, 818	
Canton Railroad	5	44–48	
Cedar Rapids and Iowa City Railway	1	94	
Champion Papers Inc	1	3	
Chicago and North Western Railway	2	144–145	
Chicago Great Western Railway	1	5	
Chicago, Rock Island and Pacific Railroad	29	550–563, 900–914	550-563 are 600 h.p. SW900M
Colorado and Wyoming Railway	1	214	
Texas Construction Material Company (Colorado River and Western Railroad)	1	201	
Corinth and Counce Railroad	2	901–902	
Cuyahoga Valley Railway	2	960–961	
DeQueen and Eastern Railroad	1	D-4	
Detroit Edison Company	1	214	
Hammond Lumber Company (Feather River Railway)	1	102	
Fernwood, Columbia and Gulf Railroad	1	900	
Grand Trunk Railroad (of Maine)	2	7225-7226	
Grand Trunk Western Railroad	13	7227–7232, 7262–7268	
Granite City Steel Company	2	900–901	
Great Lakes Steel Corporation	2	6-7	
Hanna Furnace Company	1	17	
Hercules Powder Company	1	61	
Inland Lime and Stone Company	1	10	
Jacksonville Terminal Company	3	37–39	
Lancaster and Chester Railway	2	90–91	L&C 91 was the last EMD built SW900 in 11/65
Lehigh Valley Railroad	12	106-107, 110, 120–127, 130	107,110 are 600 h.p. SW900M, 106 is 660 h.p. SW900M
Liberian American-Swedish Minerals Company	5	201-205	Liberia, Africa
McLouth Steel Corporation	2	6–7	
Missouri Portland Cement Company	1	1	
Monessen Southwestern Railway	3	28–30	
New York Central Railroad	16	9631–9646	
New York Central System (Cleveland Union Terminal Company)	3	9628–9630	
Orinoco Mining Company	7	1090–1096	Venezuela, South America; 1093-1096 Built with Dynamic Brakes
Philadelphia Bethlehem and New England Railroad	2	51-52	
Pickering Lumber Company	4	101–104	
Raritan River Railroad	6	1–6	
Reading Company	21	10-15, 1501–1515	10-15 are 660 h.p. SW900M
Republic Steel Corporation	12	345, 347–349, 354–359, 373–374	
River Terminal Railway	10	90–98, 100	99 was EMD demo
Sand Springs Railway	3	100–102	
Simpson Logging Company	1	900	Built with dynamic brakes. Last known operating SW900 with dynamic.
South Peru Copper Company	2	9-10	Peru, South America
Southern Pacific Transportation Company	10	4624–4633	
Steelton and Highspire Railroad	2	21, 27	
U.S. Steel Corporation	1	157	
U.S. Sugar Corporation	3	154–156	
Valdosta Southern Railroad	1	955	
Virginia-Carolina Chemical Company	1	1	
Waterloo Railroad	3	1–3	Waterloo 4 was EMD demo 6535
Woodward Iron Company	1	62	
Youngstown Sheet and Tube Company	5	900–904	
Total	274		

=== Built by General Motors Diesel, Canada ===
Railroad	Quantity	Road numbers	Notes
Algoma Steel	1	51	
Aluminum Company of Canada ("Alcan")	1	1003	
British Columbia Electric Railway / BC Hydro	12	900–911	to Southern Railway of British Columbia BC Hydro 911 was the last SW900 built in 3/69, all twelve built with road trucks and M.U. and sometimes referred to as SW900RS
Canadian National Railways	54	7233–7261, 8535–8559	CN group 8535-8542 production started 12/53 first built
Canadian Pacific Railway	11	6710–6720	
McKinnon Industries	1	47074	
Midland Railway Company of Manitoba	1	1	
Steel Company of Canada ("Stelco")	16	78–93	
Total	97		

== See also ==
- List of GM-EMD locomotives
- List of GMD Locomotives
