= Fernley and Lassen Railway =

Railway in Nevada and California

Fernley & Lassen
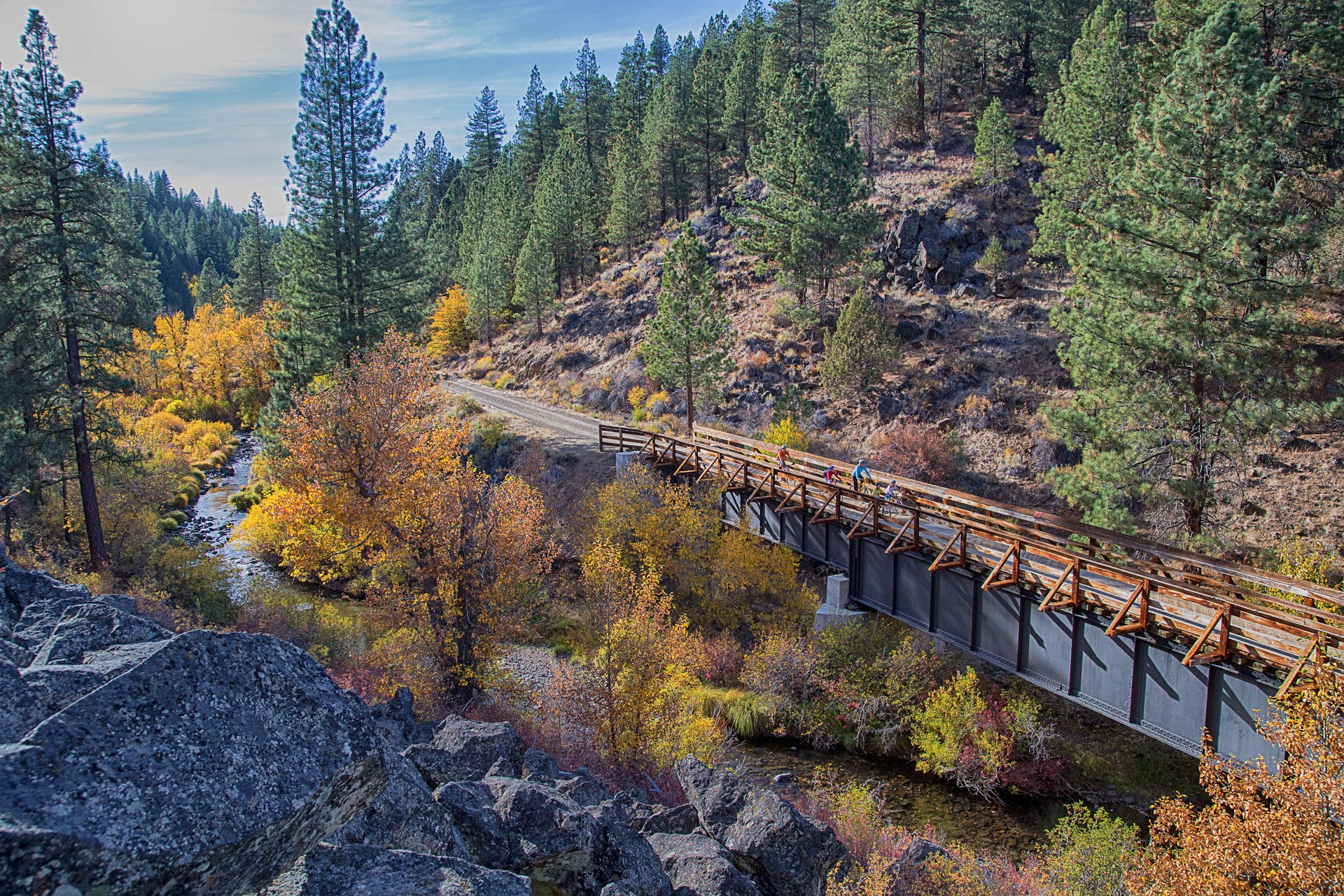
- Bizz Johnson Rail Trail, October 2012

Overview
- Locale: Fernley, Nevada - Westwood, California
- Dates of operation: 1914–1978

Technical
- Track gauge: 1,435 mm (4 ft 8 1/2 in)

The Fernley and Lassen was a rail line of the Southern Pacific Railroad constructed in 1912–14 between Fernley, Nevada and Westwood, California, near Susanville, a distance of approximately 112 miles (180 km). The railroad was constructed to connect the Red River Lumber Company's facilities in Westwood with the Southern Pacific's main line running through Fernley. After the railroad's construction, it was heavily used by other nearby lumber companies; the Fruit Growers Supply Company maintained the longest-lived railroad connection with the Fernley & Lassen, with an active connection present between 1920 and 1953.

== Route ==
Coming from Fernley, the line roughly follows modern-day Nevada State Route 427 to Wadsworth, then parallels Nevada State Route 447 until the railroad veers westward just south of Nixon. From there, it briefly parallels Nevada State Route 446 until it merges with Pyramid Highway. From there, it parallels Pyramid Highway through Sutcliffe and Zenobia, until it veers sharply to the west and starts paralleling High Rock Road. In Flanigan, the Fernley & Lassen intersects the original Western Pacific Railroad, then continues on to Wendel, California. From Wendel, it heads due west, passing by the northern coast of Honey Lake, then through Litchfield and Leavitt, until finally reaching Susanville. From Susanville, the right-of-way continues into the Sierra Nevada range and on to Westwood.

A short section (approximately one mile) of track is still in use, connecting the Nevada Cement plant in Fernley to the Union Pacific line.

== History ==
Due to the Great Depression, which significantly lowered freight volume, and the completion of Western Pacific's competing branch to Westwood, the Fernley & Lassen's days were numbered. By 1934, passenger traffic service had been discontinued, with local rail freighting following it in 1956. In 1978, the Interstate Commerce Commission approved the Southern Pacific's petition for removal.

In 1980, the Bureau of Land Management performed a rail to trail conversion and created the Bizz Johnson Rail Trail, a 25.4-mile (40.9 km) National Recreation Trail. The trail was named after Bizz Johnson, a US congressman who was critical in the conversion process. The trail was built from Susanville to Westwood, using the right-of-way, the grading, and the original bridges of the railway. In Fernley, the Fernley and Lassen Railway Depot has been restored as has the depot in Susanville.

== Stations ==
The Fernley and Lassen Railway had the following stations:

- Fernley and Lassen Railway Depot (Fernley, Nevada)
- Wadsworth
- Sutcliffe
- Pyramid
- Zenobia
- Flanigan
- Stacy, California
- Wendel
- Litchfield
- Leavitt
- Susanville Railroad Depot (Susanville)
- Goumaz
- Lasco
- Westwood
