= Hirz Fire =

2018 wildfire in Northern California

- Part of the 2018 California wildfires
- Date: August 9, 2018 –; September 12, 2018
- Location: Shasta National Forest, California, United States
- Coordinates: 40.891°N 122.228°W

Statistics
- Burned area: 46,150 acres (187 km^{2})

Impacts
- Deaths: None reported
- Injuries: None reported
- Structures lost: None
- Cost: Unknown

Map
- The fire's location in Northern California

The Hirz Fire was a 2018 wildfire that burned near Lakehead, California in the Shasta National Forest. The fire burned a total of 46,150 acres (187 km^{2}), before it was fully contained on September 12. The fire was burning only a few miles from the enormous Carr Fire, the sixth-most destructive fire in California history. On September 10, the growing Delta Fire burned into the western perimeter of the Hirz Fire.

== Progression ==
The fire began on August 9, 2018.

The fire continued to burn through August 2018. On August 13, 2018, the Hirz Fire had burned 4,404 acres (17.82 km^{2}) and was 5% contained.

The Hirz Fire continued to grow in size, eventually reaching 46,150 acres (186.8 km^{2}) by early September 2018. Afterward, fire growth stopped, while firefighters made significant progress on containing the fire. On September 10, the growing Delta Fire burned into the western perimeter of the Hirz Fire. During the evening of September 12, the Hirz Fire was 100% contained, at 46,150 acres (186.8 km^{2}).

== See also ==
- 2018 California wildfires
  - Carr Fire
  - Delta Fire
