= Phillips, California =

Unincorporated community in California, United States

Phillips
- Unincorporated community
- Location in California Phillips (the United States)
- Coordinates: 38°49′05″N 120°04′40″W
- Country: United States
- State: California
- County: El Dorado
- Elevation: 6,873 ft (2,095 m)

Phillips (formerly Phillip's and Vade Post Office) is a small unincorporated community in El Dorado County, California, United States. It is located on the South Fork of the American River, 2.5 miles (4 km) west of Echo Summit, at an elevation of 6,873 feet (2095 m). It is the site of the Sierra-at-Tahoe ski resort. The ZIP code is 95720. The community is served by area code 530.

Joseph Wells Davis Phillips began cattle ranching here in 1859, and opened a hotel in 1863. The Vade post office operated at Phillips from 1912 to 1961. As of 2020, the Phillips family still owned the townsite, which has long been a site for manual surveys of Sierra Nevada snowpack.
