= Flanigan, Nevada =

- Ghost town
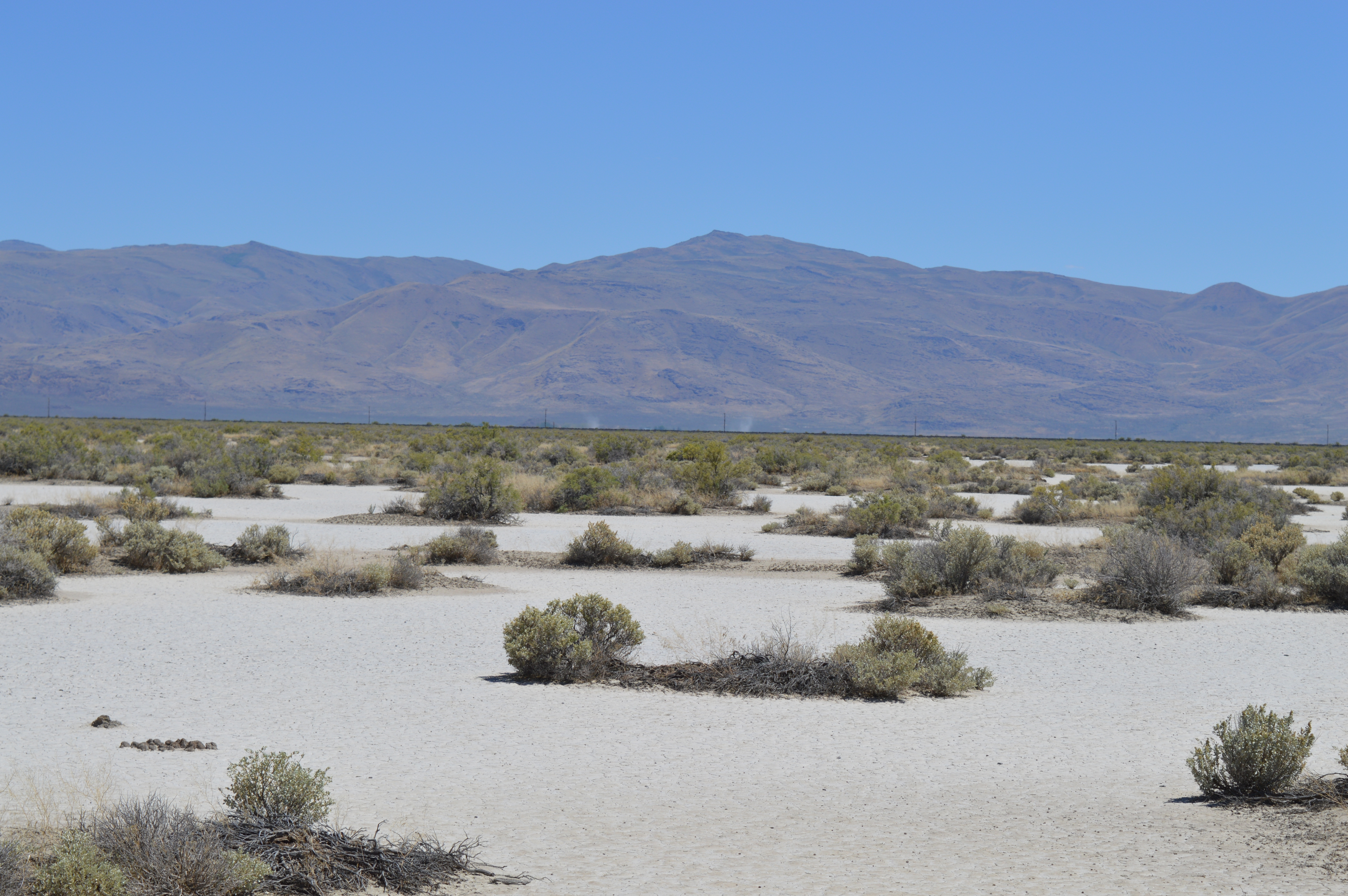
- View toward Flanigan townsite and the former Western Pacific line, 2015

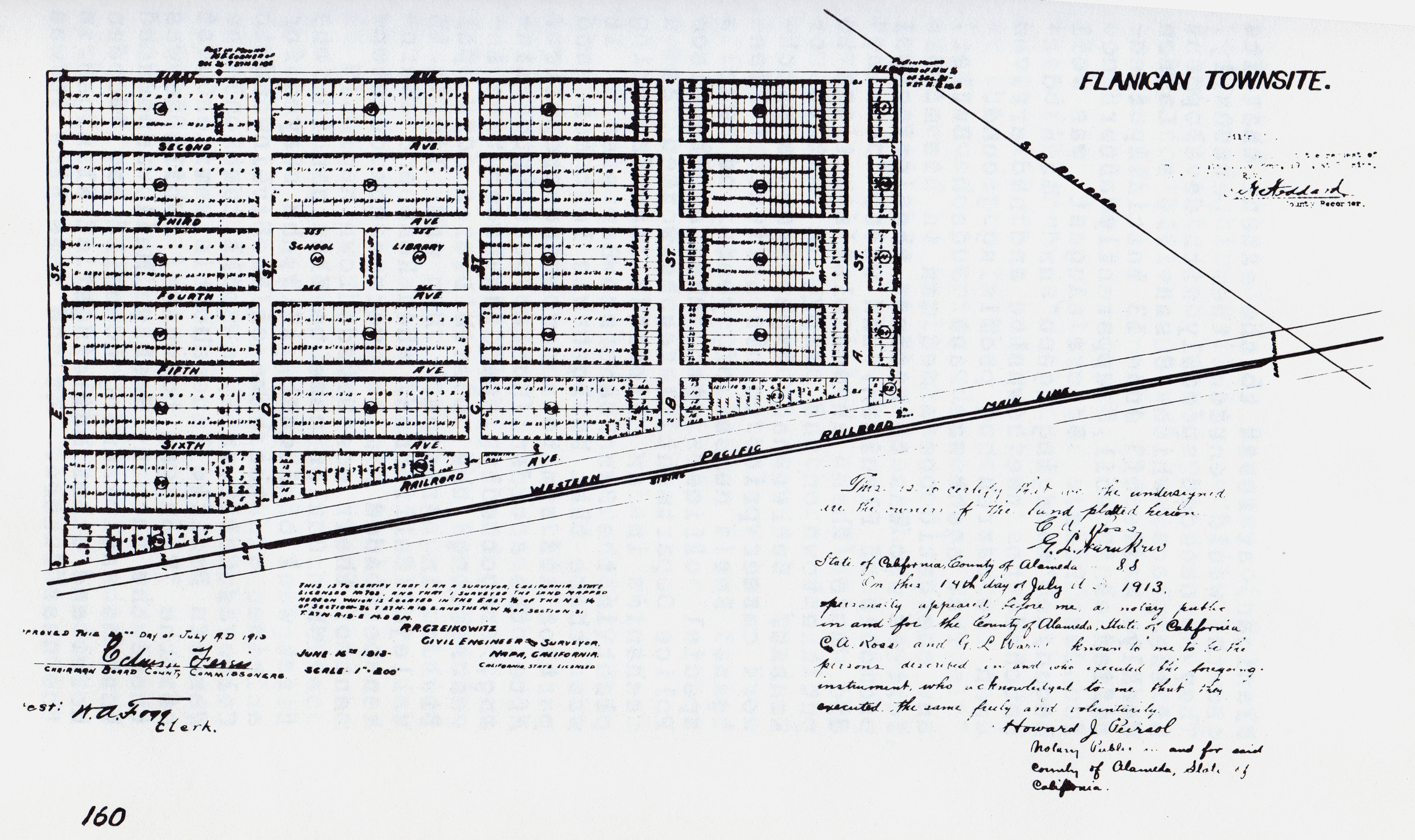
- Flanigan townsite surveyor map, 1913

- Location within the state of Nevada Flanigan (the United States)
- Coordinates: 40°10′15″N 119°53′12″W
- Country: United States
- State: Nevada
- County: Washoe
- Established: 1909
- Deed filed: July 16, 1913
- Abandoned: 1973
- Elevation: 4,006 ft (1,221 m)
- Time zone: UTC-8 (Pacific (PST))
  - Summer (DST): UTC-7 (PDT)
- ZIP codes: 89510
- Area code: 775
- GNIS feature ID: 840501

Flanigan is a ghost town and former crossroads village in Washoe County, Nevada, in the United States. It is located in Honey Lake Valley, 5 miles (8.0 km) east of the California border (Lassen County), and west of Pyramid Lake.

Flanigan is located in a high desert region, mostly alkali flats with some sagebrush and cheatgrass. Flanigan Playa is located south of the Flanigan townsite.

== History ==
Flanigan was established in 1909 with the building of the Western Pacific Railroad Feather River Route between Oakland and Salt Lake City. The station in Honey Lake Valley was named after Patrick L. Flanigan, a landowner and businessman whom Western Pacific purchased right of way from in the area. In 1913, the Southern Pacific Railroad built its Fernley & Lassen branch, with the two lines crossing at Flanigan. A deed for Flanigan Townsite was filed on July 16, 1913.

The town grew after the opening of the railroad station, with the establishment of a post office in the spring of 1914, the building of a schoolhouse in the summer, and the establishment of a voting precinct in July. Railroad business contributed to most of the growth, with peak population of a few hundred in the 1920s, mostly Southern Pacific and Western Pacific employees. Throughout the next several decades, oil, natural gas and bog lime prospects would occasionally revive interest in the town, but none of the prospects would ever pan out. In addition, no suitable well water was ever discovered, requiring water to be shipped in by rail.

Population slowly dwindled, with only a handful of residents remaining by the 1950s. In March 1959, Southern Pacific Railroad closed the Flanigan station. By fall 1960, only one permanent resident remained, schoolteacher Gertrude Milne, who tended the store and taught 7 children from surrounding areas. The post office closed in March 1961, and a fire destroyed the store in January 1969. The school was closed by the Washoe County School District at the end of the spring 1969 semester, and Milne moved to Reno in 1973, where she would die later that year.

Later in the 1970s, investors bought land just east of Flanigan, established dirt streets and planned to sell parcels for $200-$300 each, as a novelty to capitalize on Flanigan's Western ghost town history, intending to give parcels to celebrities like John Wayne and Clint Eastwood to draw publicity. However, the Interstate Land Sales Full Disclosure Act of 1968 requires new developments with plots sold over $100 to have basic infrastructure such as sewer and street lighting, which made the plan unprofitable, and the venture was abandoned.

In 1985, a wildfire swept through the area and destroyed the few remaining structures in Flanigan.
