= Stacy, California =

Stacy
- Unincorporated community
- Location in California Stacy (the United States)
- Coordinates: 40°13′48″N 120°01′17″W
- Country: United States
- State: California
- County: Lassen
- Elevation: 4,016 ft (1,224 m)

Stacy was an unincorporated town in Lassen County, California, United States. It is located 15 miles (24 km) north-northeast of Doyle, at an elevation of 4016 feet (1224 m). It was founded as a station on the Fernley and Lassen Railway in expectation of agricultural development of the area; without irrigation, however, the area faded away.

A post office operated at Stacy from 1912 to 1951. The name honored Stacy Spoon, the wife of the postmaster.
