= Coutolenc, California =

Human settlement in United States of America

Coordinates: 39°52′23″N 121°34′43″W

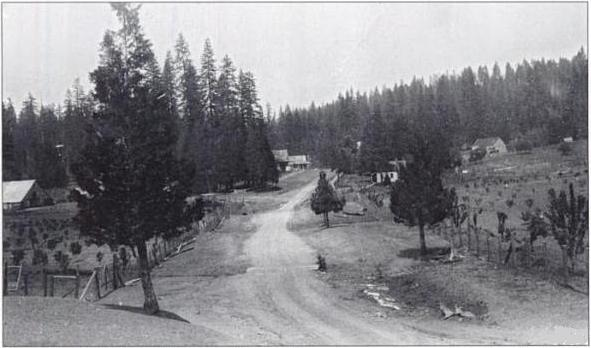
The village of 'Old Lovelock' in the 1860s

Coutolenc (alternatively Old Lovelock, Brownharts, and Musselmans) is a former settlement in Butte County, California, United States that was located 8.5 miles (13.7 km) northeast of Paradise.

== History ==
The original village at this spot was founded by the English settler George Lovelock (1824–1907), after whom the town of Lovelock, Nevada was eventually named. Arriving in the state in 1851, he had followed the mining and logging northwards and finally settled in the forest near Butte Creek, operating a small mill to harvest sugar pine. He also retailed lumber and built a store to serve the settlement growing up around him. When the demand for lumber ceased after 1864 because of the American Civil War, he left for Nevada.

A post office called Lovelocks had been opened in his store, but this now moved northwards to the present unincorporated settlement called Lovelock on the Skyway crossroads. During the 1880s, a settler from the French Alps named Eugene Fortunat Coutolenc had bought land in the thriving village of Old Lovelock, which now had a hotel and saloon, and began agitating for the former post office to be reopened. In 1890, it was given the name of Coutolenc and remained so named until 1937.
