= Lasco, California =

Unincorporated community in California, United States

Lasco
- Seasonal logging camp
- Location in California Lasco (the United States)
- Coordinates: 40°25′21″N 120°58′22″W
- Country: United States
- State: California
- County: Lassen
- Elevation: 5,574 ft (1,699 m)

Lasco was a seasonal logging camp in Lassen County, California, United States. It was located on what was the Fernley and Lassen Railway branch of the Southern Pacific Railroad, 8 miles (13 km) north of Westwood, at an elevation of 5574 feet (1699 m).

Lasco was the site of a prominent logging camp constructed in 1922. It opened in 1923, and was a seasonal home for 250 loggers as well as their families. The camp was reportedly so attractive that cars would pull in thinking it was a summer resort.

Seasonal occupation ended after the 1930 logging season. Evidence of the camp could still be found on the ground according to a 1983 U.S. Forest Service report.

The former Lasco rail station now lies along the Bizz Johnson trail, which was created after the Fernley and Lassen Railway line was abandoned in 1978.

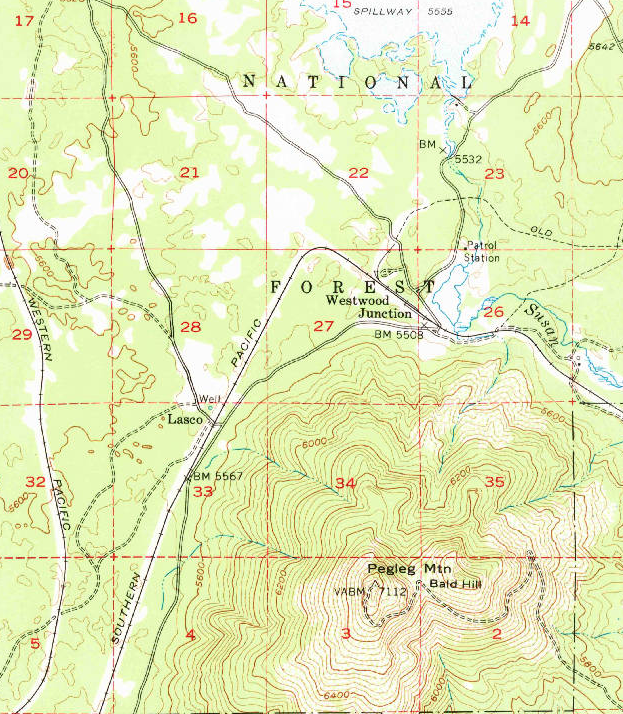
1955 USGS map showing site of Lasco along rail line.
