= Lovelock, California =

Unincorporated community in California, United States

Lovelock
- Unincorporated community
- Location in California Lovelock (the United States)
- Coordinates: 39°53′29″N 121°34′40″W
- Country: United States
- State: California
- County: Butte
- Elevation: 3,136 ft (956 m)

Lovelock (formerly Lovelocks and Lovelocks Store) is an unincorporated community in Butte County, California, United States. It is located 2.5 miles (4.0 km) west-southwest of Stirling City and lies at an elevation of 3136 feet (956 m).

The place gained its name when the post office moved northwards from its former location at George Lovelock's settlement in what later became known as Coutolenc. 'New Lovelock' then had a slaughterhouse, a store and a school, and the post office remained open from 1871 to 1922. The healthy mountain air has drawn many to settle along the roads running north through the forest from the Skyway road and there is now a restaurant there called the Lovelock Inn.
