= Lost City, California =

Lost City
- Unincorporated community
- Location in California Lost City (the United States)
- Coordinates: 38°05′12″N 120°44′59″W
- Country: United States
- State: California
- County: Calaveras
- Elevation: 1,053 ft (321 m)

Lost City (formerly Stone City and Stone Creek Settlement) is an unincorporated community in Calaveras County, California, United States,11 miles (18 km) from Angels Camp along Bear Creek. It lies at an elevation of 1053 feet (321 m). Lost City was constructed in the 1870s by Eugene Barbe. It consists of roughly one dozen stone buildings, which may have been an early Icarian commune (followers of the utopian socialist ideals of Etienne Cabet). The settlement was abandoned by 1896, though a few walls of the original dry-laid field stone buildings remain. The ruins are currently on private land.
