= Lytton, California =

Unincorporated community in California, United States

- Unincorporated community
- Location within California Location within the United States
- Coordinates: 38°39′34″N 122°52′18″W
- Country: United States
- State: California
- County: Sonoma
- Elevation: 184 ft (56 m)
- Time zone: UTC-8 (Pacific (PST))
  - Summer (DST): UTC-7 (PDT)
- Area code: 707
- GNIS feature ID: 227874

Lytton is an unincorporated community in Sonoma County, California, United States. The community is situated on U.S. Route 101, 3.4 miles (5.5 km) north of Healdsburg.

The community of Lytton grew up around a large luxury resort built at the site in 1872 by Capt. William H. Litton. After Litton's death in the 1880s, the site briefly became a military school for boys, until in 1893 it was purchased by an Oakland doctor and converted into a sanitarium. The Salvation Army purchased the sanitarium in 1904, and for many years thereafter operated it as the Lytton Orphanage and School for Boys and Girls. Beginning in 1959, the facility became an adult rehabilitation center. The Salvation Army finally sold the Lytton Springs facility in 2017. The Lytton Band of Pomo Indians purchased the site for some $30 million, after many years of unsuccessfully trying to reacquire lands lost during the federal dissolution of California Indian rancherias.

Lytton once had a station on the Northwestern Pacific Railroad.
