= Leavitt, California =

Unincorporated community in California, United States

- Former locale
- Location of Leavitt in California
- Coordinates: 40°23′46″N 120°31′34″W
- Country: United States
- State: California
- County: Lassen
- Elevation: 4,104 ft (1,251 m)
- Time zone: UTC-8 (PST)
  - Summer (DST): UTC-7 (PDT)
- GNIS feature ID: 226986

Leavitt is an unincorporated community in Lassen County, California, United States, located alongside the Southern Pacific Railroad, Fernley and Lassen Railway branch, 7 miles (11 km) east of Susanville, and 7 miles west of Litchfield, at an elevation of 4,104 feet (1,251 m). It is the site of the High Desert State Prison.

== History ==
Benjamin Hanson Leavitt (1834–1918), a pioneer rancher and lumberman who came from the state of Maine, settled in Lassen County in 1864 and proposed to build this town on his ranch in 1912. It consisted of one store, a few dwellings and a corral. Benjamin Leavitt was a descendant of Samuel Leavitt of Exeter, New Hampshire.

Benjamin Leavitt engineered the Honey Lake Valley irrigation system, including Leavitt Lake. Leavitt also named nearby Clinton, California, for his hometown of Clinton in Kennebec County, Maine. (The town was renamed Leavitt Lake in 1973 when house construction began there.) Benjamin Leavitt was married to Celara Cleveland (Edwards) Leavitt, born in Massachusetts.

A post office at Leavitt was established in October 1914, and named after May F. Leavitt, the first postmaster. It was discontinued in December 1920.
