= Feather River Railway =

Overview
- Headquarters: Feather Falls, California
- Locale: Butte County, California
- Dates of operation: 1922–1966

Technical
- Track gauge: 4 ft 8 1/2 in (1,435 mm) standard gauge

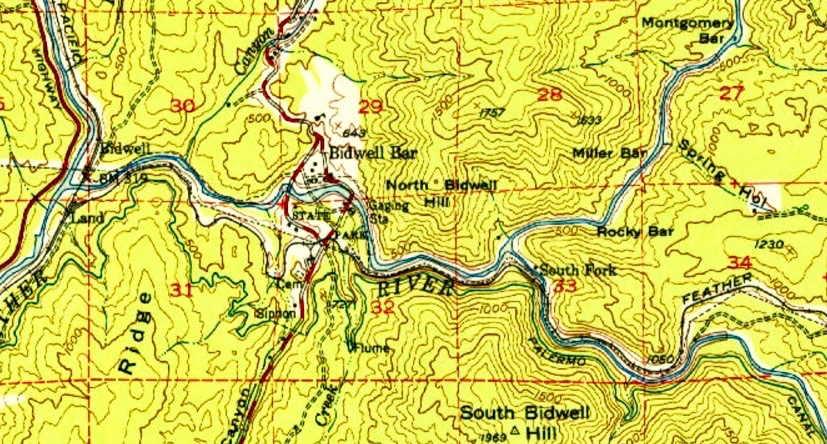
Western section of 1948 route with connection to Western Pacific line

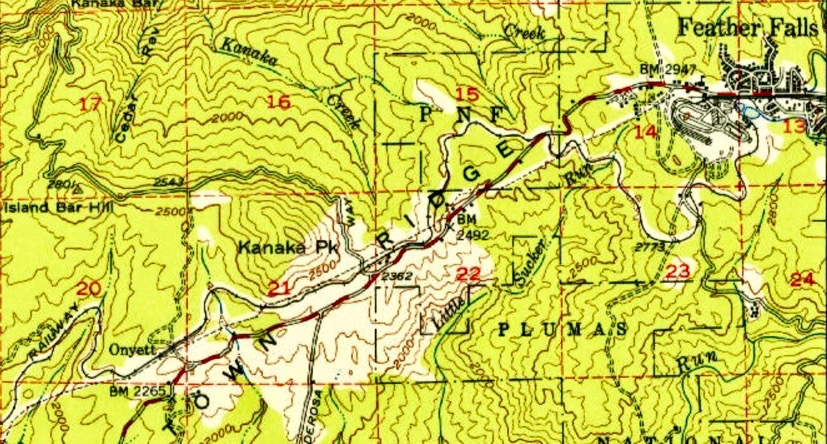
Eastern portion of route in 1948

The Feather River Railway was built in 1922 for the Hutchinson Lumber Company to bring logs from Feather Falls, California, to a connection with the Western Pacific Railroad (WP) at Bidwell, California. The WP would then transport the logs to the Hutchinson sawmill in Oroville, California. The sawmill burned in 1927; and the railway was unused through the Great Depression until reorganized as a common carrier in 1938 to serve a new sawmill built at Feather Falls. Georgia-Pacific purchased the sawmill and railway in 1955. The railway ceased operation after portions of the grade were flooded by Oroville Dam during the Christmas flood of 1964.

== Locomotives ==
Number	Builder	Type	Date	Works number	Notes
1	Lima Locomotive Works	3-truck Shay locomotive	1921	3169	purchased new; placed on display at Oroville in 1961
2	Lima Locomotive Works	3-truck Shay locomotive	1922	3177	purchased new. Sold to Sierra Railway.
3	Lima Locomotive Works	3-truck Shay locomotive	1923	3221	purchased new, operational as Cass Scenic Railroad #11, Cass, West Virginia
4	H.K. Porter, Inc.	0-6-0 Tank locomotive	1907	3951	built as Mammoth Copper Mining Company #4; scrapped in 1957
5	Willamette Iron and Steel Works	3-truck Willamette locomotive	1923	9	purchased new; scrapped in 1957
8	GE Transportation	GE 44-ton switcher	1951	30791	built as C.D. Johnson Lumber Company #8; purchased in 1963
91	Lima Locomotive Works	3-truck Shay locomotive	1928	3322	built as Polson Logging Company #91; purchased for parts in 1958; scrapped
102	Electro-Motive Diesel	EMD SW900	1959	25504	built as Hammond Redwood Company #102; purchased in 1961
A	Plymouth Locomotive Works	gas-mechanical locomotive	1930	3476	built for Garfield & Company
