= Little Reed Heights, Tiburon, California =

Little Reed Heights
- Former unincorporated community District of Tiburon
- Location in California
- Coordinates: 37°53′45″N 122°29′09″W
- Country: United States
- State: California
- County: Marin County
- City: Tiburon
- Elevation: 75 ft (23 m)

Little Reed Heights is a former unincorporated community now incorporated in Tiburon in Marin County, California. It lies at an elevation of 75 feet (23 m).
