= Lonoak, California =

Unincorporated community in California, United States

Lonoak
- Unincorporated community
- Location in California Lonoak (the United States)
- Coordinates: 36°16′39″N 120°56′35″W
- Country: United States
- State: California
- County: Monterey
- Elevation: 883 ft (269 m)

Lonoak (formerly Lone Oak and Loanoke) is an unincorporated community in Monterey County, California, United States. It is located 11 miles (18 km) east-northeast of King City on California State Route 25, at an elevation of 883 feet (269 m).

A post office operated at Lonoak from 1885 to 1954.
