= Loganville, California =

Unincorporated community in California, United States

- Unincorporated community
- Location within California Location within the United States
- Coordinates: 39°34′05″N 120°40′02″W
- Country: United States
- State: California
- County: Sierra
- Elevation: 3,980 ft (1,210 m)
- Time zone: UTC-8 (Pacific (PST))
  - Summer (DST): UTC-7 (PDT)
- Area code: 530
- GNIS feature ID: 1658996

Loganville is an unincorporated community in Sierra County, California, United States. Loganville is 2 miles (3.2 km) west of Sierra City.
