= Fernley station =

- Fernley and Lassen Railway Depot
- U.S. National Register of Historic Places
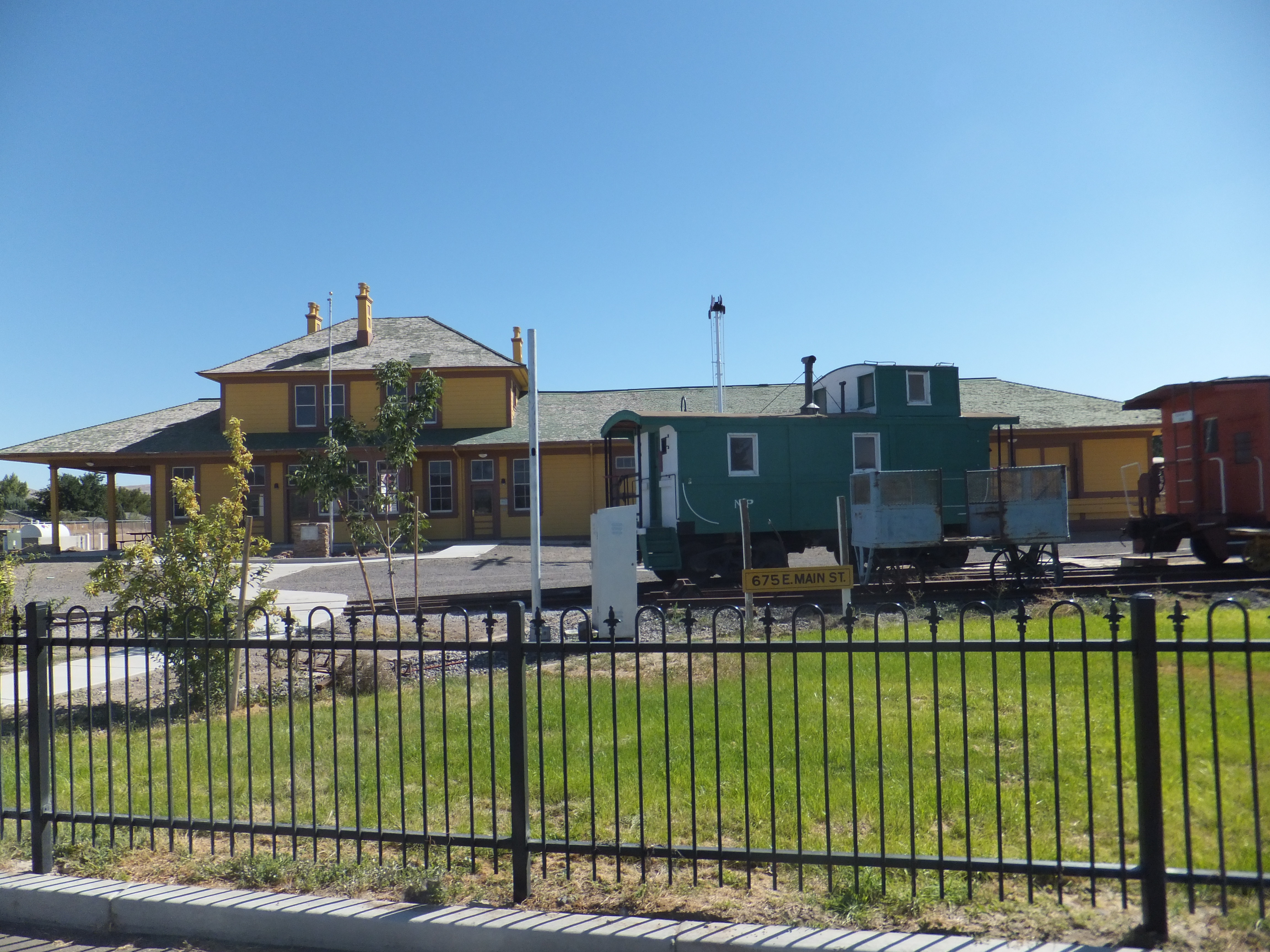

- Location within Nevada Location within the United States
- Location: 675 E. Main St., Fernley, Nevada
- Coordinates: 39.6055°N 119.2376°W
- Area: 1.2 acres (0.49 ha)
- Built: 1914
- Built by: Southern Pacific RR Co.
- Architectural style: Railroad Patternbook
- NRHP reference No.: 05000513
- Added to NRHP: June 1, 2005

The Fernley and Lassen Railway Depot in Fernley, Nevada was built in 1914, and was the eastern end of the Fernley and Lassen Railway line of the Southern Pacific Railroad, 30 miles from Reno. Also known as the Southern Pacific Railroad Depot, it was listed on the National Register of Historic Places in 2005.

The station is a 187-by-26-foot (57.0 m × 7.9 m) wood-frame building of the Southern Pacific Railroad Company's "Common Standard Station Plan #22" and is significant as a good surviving example of railroad pattern book architecture, and the only example of that specific plan surviving in Nevada. It was a passenger and goods depot, with accommodation for the station master on the second floor. It was part of 112-mile Fernley and Lassen Railway, which joined the Red River Lumber Company in Westwood with the main line of the Southern Pacific Railroad Company, unifying the Southern Pacific Railroad's system in Oregon, Nevada, and California and providing rail transportation to farming and ranching communities in northeastern California and northwestern Nevada.

Fernley station was used until 1985. In 1986, the Fernley Preservation Society bought the building from the Southern Pacific, and moved it approximately 2 miles (3.2 km) southeast to a site on Main Street. It was named to the Nevada State Register of Historic Places in November 2001, and to the National Register of Historic Places on June 1, 2005.

From 2000 to 2011, the town, later city of Fernley had a management agreement with the Fernley Preservation Society, which operated a railroad museum at the depot. The city ordered the building closed in 2011 over liability issues and took possession of it in 2014 with a view to renovating it more fully. The former Churchill School Building #4, a one-room schoolhouse from a ranch in Dayton, is located behind the depot building, where it was moved in 2000.

| Preceding station | Southern Pacific Railroad | Following station |
|---|---|---|
| Sparks toward Oakland Pier | Overland Route | Hazen toward Ogden |
| Wadsworth toward Westwood | Fernley and Lassen | Terminus |
