= Tsuka, California =

Former Maidu settlement

Tsuka is a former Maidu settlement in Butte County, California, United States. It was located in the neighborhood of Forbestown; its precise location is unknown.
