= Lumpkin, California =

Former settlement in California, United States

Lumpkin
- Ghost town
- Location in California Lumpkin (the United States)
- Coordinates: 39°36′36″N 121°12′32″W
- Country: United States
- State: California
- County: Butte
- Elevation: 3,586 ft (1,093 m)

Lumpkin was a ghost town in Butte County, California, United States. It was located 6 miles (10 km) north-northwest of Clipper Mills on the Feather River Railway, at an elevation of 3586 feet (1093 m). It was the site of a major lumber mill, producing 3.5 million board feet per year in the late 1880s. A post office operated at Lumpkin from 1886 to 1919.
