= Lingard, California =

Unincorporated community in California, United States

Lingard
- Unincorporated community
- Location in California Lingard (the United States)
- Coordinates: 37°14′25″N 120°23′51″W
- Country: United States
- State: California
- County: Merced
- Elevation: 194 ft (59 m)

Lingard is an unincorporated community in Merced County, California, United States. It is located on the Southern Pacific Railroad 8 miles (13 km) west of Le Grand, at an elevation of 194 feet (59 m).
