= Lokoya, California =

Unincorporated community in California, United States

Lokoya
- unincorporated community
- Location in California Lokoya (the United States)
- Coordinates: 38°22′24″N 122°25′40″W
- Country: United States
- State: California
- County: Napa
- Elevation: 1,765 ft (538 m)

Lokoya (Miwok: Lakáa-yomi, meaning "place of the cottonwood") is an unincorporated community in Napa County, California, United States. It lies at an elevation of 1,765 feet (538 m). Lokoya is located 9 miles (14.5 km) northwest of Napa.

== History ==
The community was formerly known as Solid Comfort and Johannesburg.

The Solid Comfort post office opened in 1918, changed its name to Lokoya in 1925, and closed in 1951. In the early twentieth century, Lokoya was the site of a popular resort on the slopes of Mount Veeder. Guests would arrive in Oakville by rail and travel the remaining seven miles to Lokoya by stage.

The Redwood Cemetery, along with the former settlement of Spruce Hill, California, is located to the southeast.
