= Little Norway, California =

Unincorporated community in California, United States

Little Norway
- Populated place
- Location in California Little Norway (the United States)
- Coordinates: 38°49′29″N 120°02′12″W
- Country: United States
- State: California
- County: El Dorado
- Elevation: 7,326 ft (2,233 m)

Little Norway is a populated place in El Dorado County, California, United States. It is located 14 kilometres (9 mi) west of Meyers, at an elevation of 2233m (7326 feet). The ZIP code is 95721.

== History ==
A post office was established at Little Norway in 1961. The building was damaged by fire in 1967. Two other fires broke out, a 1988 arson and a 1991 fire which caused $200,000 in damage to the Little Norway resort.

== Transport ==
Little Norway is situated on US Route 50 and was a Greyhound stop for cross country skiers.

Little Norway is also an endpoint of the Little Norway to Lower Echo Lake Trail managed by the United States Forest Service Lake Tahoe Basin Management Unit.

== Botany ==
A specimen of bullthistle or bull thistle (Cirsium vulgare), an invasive species native throughout most of Europe (north to 66°N, locally 68°N), Western Asia (east to the Yenisei Valley), and northwestern Africa, was collected near here in or before 1984.
