= Westwood, California =

Westwood
- census-designated place
- Location in Lassen County and the state of California

- Location in the United States
- Coordinates: 40°18′22″N 121°00′21″W
- Country: United States
- State: California
- County: Lassen

Area
  - Total: 5.627 sq mi (14.575 km^{2})
  - Land: 5.557 sq mi (14.393 km^{2})
  - Water: 0.071 sq mi (0.183 km^{2}) 1.25%
- Elevation: 5,128 ft (1,563 m)

Population (2020)
  - Total: 1,541
  - Density: 277.3/sq mi (107.1/km^{2})
- Time zone: UTC-8 (Pacific (PST))
  - Summer (DST): UTC-7 (PDT)
- ZIP code: 96137
- Area codes: 530, 837
- FIPS code: 06-84928
- GNIS feature ID: 1660156

Westwood is a census-designated place (CDP) in Lassen County, California, United States. Westwood is located 20 miles (32 km) west-southwest of Susanville, at an elevation of 5,128 feet (1,563 m). Its population is 1,541 as of the 2020 census, down from 1,647 from the 2010 census.

== Geography ==
Westwood is built upon lava flows from Cascade Mountain Range volcanoes to the north. Keddie Ridge is considered to be at the northern end of the Sierra Nevada Mountain Range.

According to the United States Census Bureau, the CDP has a total area of 5.63 square miles (14.6 km^{2}), of which 5.56 square miles (14.4 km^{2}) is land and 0.07 square miles (0.18 km^{2}) (1.25%) is water.

== History ==
Westwood was built by T. B. Walker to be the operations center for the Red River Lumber Company in 1913, and serviced by the Fernley and Lassen Railway built in 1912–14. The first post office opened in 1913. The Red River Lumber Company is credited as being "the world's largest electrical sawmill of the times." Red River Lumber Company also operated one of the first electric railways in the state built in 1927. The mill was equipped with the most modern equipment for its time; and the surrounding territory was crisscrossed by forest railways bringing logs to the mill. The railway shop at Westwood was home to 2-8-0 No. 102 and 2-8-2 No. 104 when forest railway operations ceased in the early 1950s. The four woods engines scrapped in 1953 were 2-6-0 number 1, 2-6-2 number 2, 2-8-2 number 3, and 3-truck Shay locomotive number 4.

William Laughead, an advertising copywriter who had once worked in lumber camps, took the stories of an old lumberjack and reworked them into the modern character. He sold the stories of Paul Bunyan and his Blue Ox "Babe" to the Red River Lumber Company, which published "Introducing Mr. Paul Bunyan of Westwood, California" in 1916 as an advertising pamphlet. Among other things, Laughead gave the name "Babe" to the blue ox, originated the idea that Paul Bunyan and Babe were of enormous size, and created the first pictorial representation of Bunyan.

The Red River Lumber Company's electric mill at Westwood made wooden Venetian blinds, plywood, boxes, doors and windows which were shipped all over the U.S. and the world. The Westwood mill set a world record in 1942 by sawing 212 million board feet.

Westwood High School's nickname is the Lumberjacks. Westwood had a very large indoor shopping mall as far back as the 1930s, as well as a large theater, skating rink and club for the mill workers. The town was sold in 1944 to the Fruit Growers Supply Company (sister cooperative of Sunkist Growers). The plant closed in 1956, and the town was sold to residents and developers.

Westwood also had a very early form of cable television. The owner of the local variety store took it upon himself to provide television service to the community. At the time three channels were available to view in Westwood, Channel 3, the NBC affiliate in Sacramento, Channel 7, the ABC affiliate in Redding and Channel 12, the CBS affiliate in Chico. Multiple antennae were mounted outside of town and coax cable was laid up and down the alleys. For a small monthly fee a home could have television service without having three separate antennae on the roof.

== Demographics ==
Historical population
Census	Pop.	Note	%±
1920	3,300		—
1930	4,600		39.4%
1940	5,454		18.6%
1950	3,861		−29.2%
1960	1,209		−68.7%
1970	1,862		54.0%
1980	2,081		11.8%
1990	2,017		−3.1%
2000	1,998		−0.9%
2010	1,647		−17.6%
2020	1,541		−6.4%
U.S. Decennial Census; 1860–1870 1880-1890; 1900 1910 1920; 1930 1940 1950; 1960 1970 1980; 1990 2000 2010

=== 2020 census ===
As of the 2020 census, Westwood had a population of 1,541. The median age was 51.2 years. 17.9% of residents were under the age of 18 and 25.5% of residents were 65 years of age or older. For every 100 females there were 106.3 males, and for every 100 females age 18 and over there were 105.7 males age 18 and over.

0.0% of residents lived in urban areas, while 100.0% lived in rural areas.

There were 722 households in Westwood, of which 19.7% had children under the age of 18 living in them. Of all households, 39.1% were married-couple households, 26.0% were households with a male householder and no spouse or partner present, and 25.9% were households with a female householder and no spouse or partner present. About 34.7% of all households were made up of individuals and 17.2% had someone living alone who was 65 years of age or older.

There were 953 housing units, of which 24.2% were vacant. The homeowner vacancy rate was 3.8% and the rental vacancy rate was 8.4%.

Racial composition as of the 2020 census
Race	Number	Percent
White	1,256	81.5%
Black or African American	11	0.7%
American Indian and Alaska Native	46	3.0%
Asian	5	0.3%
Native Hawaiian and Other Pacific Islander	2	0.1%
Some other race	39	2.5%
Two or more races	182	11.8%
Hispanic or Latino (of any race)	172	11.2%

=== 2010 census ===
The 2010 United States census reported that Westwood had a population of 1,647. The population density was 298.9 inhabitants per square mile (115.4/km^{2}). The racial makeup of Westwood was 1,430 (86.8%) White, 3 (0.2%) African American, 104 (6.3%) Native American, 10 (0.6%) Asian, 2 (0.1%) Pacific Islander, 49 (3.0%) from other races, and 49 (3.0%) from two or more races. Hispanic or Latino of any race were 179 persons (10.9%).

The Census reported that 1,647 people (100% of the population) lived in households, 0 (0%) lived in non-institutionalized group quarters, and 0 (0%) were institutionalized.

There were 715 households, out of which 219 (30.6%) had children under the age of 18 living in them, 299 (41.8%) were opposite-sex married couples living together, 87 (12.2%) had a female householder with no husband present, 51 (7.1%) had a male householder with no wife present. There were 65 (9.1%) unmarried opposite-sex partnerships, and 3 (0.4%) same-sex married couples or partnerships. 223 households (31.2%) were made up of individuals, and 92 (12.9%) had someone living alone who was 65 years of age or older. The average household size was 2.30. There were 437 families (61.1% of all households); the average family size was 2.87.

The population was spread out, with 393 people (23.9%) under the age of 18, 135 people (8.2%) aged 18 to 24, 367 people (22.3%) aged 25 to 44, 531 people (32.2%) aged 45 to 64, and 221 people (13.4%) who were 65 years of age or older. The median age was 41.3 years. For every 100 females, there were 104.9 males. For every 100 females age 18 and over, there were 104.9 males.

There were 1,005 housing units at an average density of 182.4 per square mile (70.4/km^{2}), of which 440 (61.5%) were owner-occupied, and 275 (38.5%) were occupied by renters. The homeowner vacancy rate was 5.3%; the rental vacancy rate was 15.1%. 977 people (59.3% of the population) lived in owner-occupied housing units and 670 people (40.7%) lived in rental housing units.

=== 2000 census ===
As of the census of 2000, there were 1,998 people, 795 households, and 520 families residing in the CDP. The population density was 362.5 inhabitants per square mile (140.0/km^{2}). There were 1,048 housing units at an average density of 190.1 per square mile (73.4/km^{2}). The racial makeup of the CDP was 88.39% White, 5.26% Native American, 0.25% Asian, 0.55% Pacific Islander, 2.70% from other races, and 2.85% from two or more races. Hispanic or Latino of any race were 8.51% of the population.

There were 795 households, out of which 36.5% had children under the age of 18 living with them, 46.4% were married couples living together, 12.6% had a female householder with no husband present, and 34.5% were non-families. 28.1% of all households were made up of individuals, and 10.2% had someone living alone who was 65 years of age or older. The average household size was 2.51 and the average family size was 3.10.

In the CDP, the population was spread out, with 31.4% under the age of 18, 6.1% from 18 to 24, 26.9% from 25 to 44, 24.3% from 45 to 64, and 11.3% who were 65 years of age or older. The median age was 36 years. For every 100 females, there were 100.6 males. For every 100 females age 18 and over, there were 96.8 males.

The median income for a household in the CDP was $24,148, and the median income for a family was $30,195. Males had a median income of $29,219 versus $23,646 for females. The per capita income for the CDP was $13,178. About 16.7% of families and 22.5% of the population were below the poverty line, including 30.0% of those under age 18 and 1.9% of those age 65 or over.

== Economy ==
The San Joaquin and Eastern Railroad sold Shay locomotive Lima #2534 to the Red River Lumber Company.

The BNSF Railway (BNSF) has a Maintenance of Way station and a siding that is used to store BNSF snow fighting equipment.

The Westwood Community Services District serves 2,000 people.

== Government ==
In the state legislature, Westwood is in the 1st senatorial district, represented by Republican Megan Dahle, and the 1st Assembly district, represented by Republican Heather Hadwick.

Federally, Westwood is in California's 1st congressional district, represented by Republican James Gallagher.

== Points of interest ==
Westwood is the site of the Walker family mansion and statues of Paul Bunyan and Babe the Blue Ox.

The "Bizz" Johnson Trail, ends 4 miles (6.4 km) north of Westwood, at Mason Station. Named for Harold T. Johnson, U.S. Congressman from California, the rail trail follows the 24.5 miles (39.4 km) Fernley and Lassen Railway right-of-way.

== Notable people ==
- Pat O'Dea, pioneering, Australian-born American Football kicker for the Wisconsin Badgers, fled an embezzlement charge in San Francisco and lived in Westwood under the pseudonym "Charles J. Mitchell" between 1919 and 1934.
- T. B. Walker, successful American businessperson who acquired timber in Minnesota and California and became an art collector, founding the Minneapolis Public Library and the Walker Art Center. In 1923, he was among the ten wealthiest men in the world. He built two company towns, including Westwood, which one of his sons, Archie, sold to become part of what is today known as Sunkist.

== See also ==
- Moonlight Fire
- Mountain Meadows Reservoir

== Climate ==
According to the Köppen Climate Classification system, Westwood has a warm-summer Mediterranean climate, abbreviated "Csa" on climate maps.
