= Feather Falls, California =

Unincorporated community in California, United States

Feather Falls
- Unincorporated community
- Location in California Feather Falls (the United States)
- Coordinates: 39°35′36″N 121°15′23″W
- Country: United States
- State: California
- County: Butte
- Elevation: 2,982 ft (909 m)

Feather Falls (formerly Mooretown, Moresville, and Feather River) is a rural unincorporated community in Butte County, California, United States, north and east of Lake Oroville. It lies at an elevation of 2982 feet (909 m). It is home to Feather Falls Elementary School, a K-8 facility. The community takes its name from the nearby 410-foot Feather Falls

The community's ZIP code is 95940, which is shared with part of Oroville.

== History ==
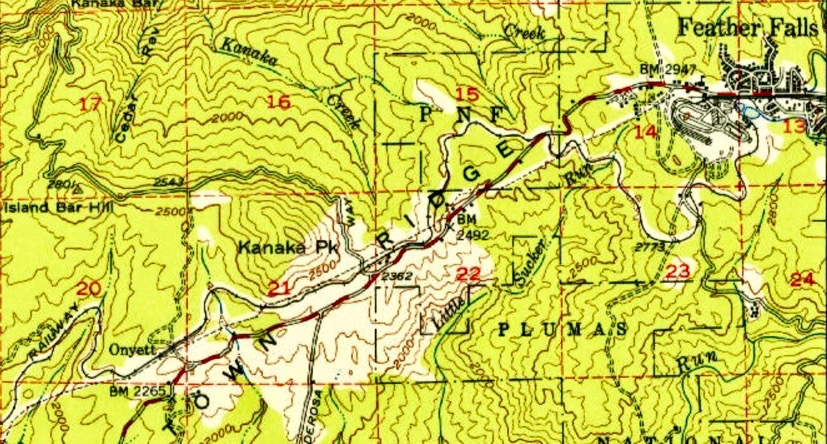
Town and railroad in 1948

The Mooretown post office operated from 1888 to 1913. The Feather River post office opened for a time in 1919, and was re-established in 1921. The name was changed to Feather Falls that same year, and moved to its present location in 1938.

In history, the community was called Mooretown and Moresville according to the US Geological Survey.

Other nearby communities to the north and east along Lumpkin Road are named Lumpkin and Rogerville.

The town was the eastern terminus of the Feather River Railway which ran west.
