= Lakehead, California =

Lakehead
- census-designated place
- Location of Lakehead in Shasta County, California.

- Position in California.
- Coordinates: 40°52′41″N 122°23′44″W
- Country: United States
- State: California
- County: Shasta

Area
  - Total: 5.279 sq mi (13.672 km^{2})
  - Land: 4.695 sq mi (12.160 km^{2})
  - Water: 0.583 sq mi (1.511 km^{2}) 11.06%
- Elevation: 1,447 ft (441 m)

Population (2020)
  - Total: 469
  - Density: 99.9/sq mi (38.6/km^{2})
- Time zone: UTC-8 (Pacific (PST))
  - Summer (DST): UTC-7 (PDT)
- ZIP code: 96051
- Area code: 530
- GNIS feature ID: 1658930

Lakehead is a census-designated place (CDP) in Shasta County, California, United States. Lakehead sits at an elevation of 1,447 feet (441 m). Lakehead is located halfway between Seattle and Los Angeles. Its population is 469 as of the 2020 census, up from 461 from the 2010 census.

== History ==
In 2018, the western part of Lakehead was closed to the public due to the Carr Fire.

== Geography ==
According to the United States Census Bureau, the CDP covers an area of 5.3 square miles (13.7 km^{2}), of which 4.7 square miles (12.1 km^{2}) is land and 0.6 square mile (1.5 km^{2}) (11.06%) is water.

=== Climate ===
According to the Köppen Climate Classification system, Lakehead has a warm-summer Mediterranean climate, abbreviated "Csa" on climate maps.

Climate data for Lakehead, California
Month	Jan	Feb	Mar	Apr	May	Jun	Jul	Aug	Sep	Oct	Nov	Dec	Year
Mean daily maximum °F (°C)	53 (12)	58 (14)	62 (17)	69 (21)	78 (26)	87 (31)	96 (36)	96 (36)	90 (32)	77 (25)	62 (17)	52 (11)	73 (23)
Mean daily minimum °F (°C)	36 (2)	37 (3)	40 (4)	43 (6)	50 (10)	56 (13)	63 (17)	60 (16)	55 (13)	48 (9)	40 (4)	36 (2)	47 (8)
Average precipitation inches (mm)	11.0 (280)	12.1 (310)	9.8 (250)	5.7 (140)	3.1 (79)	1.4 (36)	0.1 (2.5)	0.2 (5.1)	0.6 (15)	3.0 (76)	7.1 (180)	11.5 (290)	65.6 (1,663.6)
Average snowfall inches (cm)	1.7 (4.3)	2.7 (6.9)	0.5 (1.3)	0.1 (0.25)	0.0 (0.0)	0.0 (0.0)	0.0 (0.0)	0.0 (0.0)	0.0 (0.0)	0.0 (0.0)	1.6 (4.1)	3.0 (7.6)	9.6 (24.45)
Source: prism

== Demographics ==
Historical population
Census	Pop.	Note	%±
2000	549		—
2010	461		−16.0%
2020	469		1.7%
U.S. Decennial Census; 1860–1870 1880-1890; 1900 1910 1920; 1930 1940 1950; 1960 1970 1980; 1990 2000 2010

Lakehead first appeared as a census designated place under the name Lakehead-Lakeshore in the 2000 U.S. census. The CDP was renamed Lakehead prior to the 2010 U.S. census.

The 2020 United States census reported that Lakehead had a population of 469. The population density was 99.9 inhabitants per square mile (38.6/km^{2}). The racial makeup of Lakehead was 401 (85.5%) White, 1 (0.2%) African American, 7 (1.5%) Native American, 5 (1.1%) Asian, 1 (0.2%) Pacific Islander, 14 (3.0%) from other races, and 40 (8.5%) from two or more races. Hispanic or Latino of any race were 25 persons (5.3%).

The whole population lived in households. There were 228 households, out of which 17 (7.5%) had children under the age of 18 living in them, 81 (35.5%) were married-couple households, 19 (8.3%) were cohabiting couple households, 48 (21.1%) had a female householder with no partner present, and 80 (35.1%) had a male householder with no partner present. 99 households (43.4%) were one person, and 49 (21.5%) were one person aged 65 or older. The average household size was 2.06. There were 113 families (49.6% of all households).

The age distribution was 62 people (13.2%) under the age of 18, 8 people (1.7%) aged 18 to 24, 64 people (13.6%) aged 25 to 44, 173 people (36.9%) aged 45 to 64, and 162 people (34.5%) who were 65 years of age or older. The median age was 58.2 years. For every 100 females, there were 126.6 males.

There were 360 housing units at an average density of 76.7 units per square mile (29.6 units/km^{2}), of which 228 (63.3%) were occupied. Of these, 175 (76.8%) were owner-occupied, and 53 (23.2%) were occupied by renters.

As of March 2019 there were over 700 registered voters in Lakehead.

=== 2000 ===
As of the census of 2000, there were 549 people, 240 households, and 173 families residing in the CDP. The population density was 53.7 inhabitants per square mile (20.7/km^{2}). There were 325 housing units at an average density of 31.8 per square mile (12.3/km^{2}). The racial makeup of the CDP was 92.71% White, 0.18% African American, 3.64% Native American, 1.46% from other races, and 2.00% from two or more races. Hispanic or Latino of any race were 2.55% of the population.

There were 240 households, out of which 20.4% had children under the age of 18 living with them, 60.8% were married couples living together, 7.5% had a female householder with no husband present, and 27.9% were non-families. 22.9% of all households were made up of individuals, and 10.8% had someone living alone who was 65 years of age or older. The average household size was 2.29 and the average family size was 2.63.

In the CDP, the population was spread out, with 17.7% under the age of 18, 3.6% from 18 to 24, 18.9% from 25 to 44, 35.9% from 45 to 64, and 23.9% who were 65 years of age or older. The median age was 49 years. For every 100 females, there were 99.6 males. For every 100 females age 18 and over, there were 98.2 males.

The median income for a household in the CDP was $31,316, and the median income for a family was $31,316. Males had a median income of $21,027 versus $38,333 for females. The per capita income for the CDP was $17,326. About 9.4% of families and 11.8% of the population were below the poverty line, including 13.0% of those under age 18 and 13.0% of those age 65 or over.

In the summer, Lakehead can have over 1,500 seasonal residents along with the other 549 residents.

== Politics ==
In the state legislature Lakehead is in the 1st senatorial district, represented by Republican Megan Dahle, and the 1st Assembly district, represented by Republican Heather Hadwick.

Federally, Lakehead is in California's 1st congressional district, represented by Republican James Gallagher.
