= Meadowood =

Meadowood may refer to:

- Meadowood, Pennsylvania
- Meadowood Mall
- Meadowood, Aurora, Colorado
- Meadowood Estates, California
- The Restaurant at Meadowood, a Michelin Guide 3-star restaurant located in Napa Valley, California
