= Chrome, California =

Unincorporated community in California, United States

Chrome
- Unincorporated community
- Interactive map of Chrome
- Coordinates: 39°43′45″N 122°32′58″W
- Country: United States
- State: California
- County: Glenn
- Elevation: 935 ft (285 m)

Chrome is an unincorporated community in Glenn County, California, United States. It is located 9.01 miles (15 km) north of Elk Creek, at an elevation of 935 feet (285 m). The community lies on Country Road 306. Its zip code is 95963.

Chrome is named for the chromium that was mined in the area. The local chromium mill closed in the 1940s when the major mines were exhausted.

Chrome had a school until the 1950s. In 1978, the old Chrome schoolhouse, built in 1891, was moved to the Glenn County Fairgrounds in Orland.
