= Orland Buttes =

- Location within California

Highest point
- Elevation: 1,037 ft (316 m) NAVD 88
- Coordinates: 39°45′10″N 122°19′58″W

Geography
- Location: Glenn / Tehama counties, California, U.S.
- Topo map: USGS Black Butte Dam

The Orland Buttes consist of two buttes (hills) separated by Hambright Creek. They are in Glenn and Tehama counties, adjacent to Black Butte Lake and 7.2 miles (11.6 km) west of the city of Orland and I-5. Black Butte Lake is an artificial lake created to provide flood control and irrigation.

The Orland Buttes stand in the fields of the northern Central Valley of California. The southern butte is the highest at 1,037 feet (316 m) while the northern butte has a summit elevation of about 943 feet (287 m) They are a popular hiking/climbing destination.
