= East Park Dam =

Coordinates: 39°21′41″N 122°30′48″W

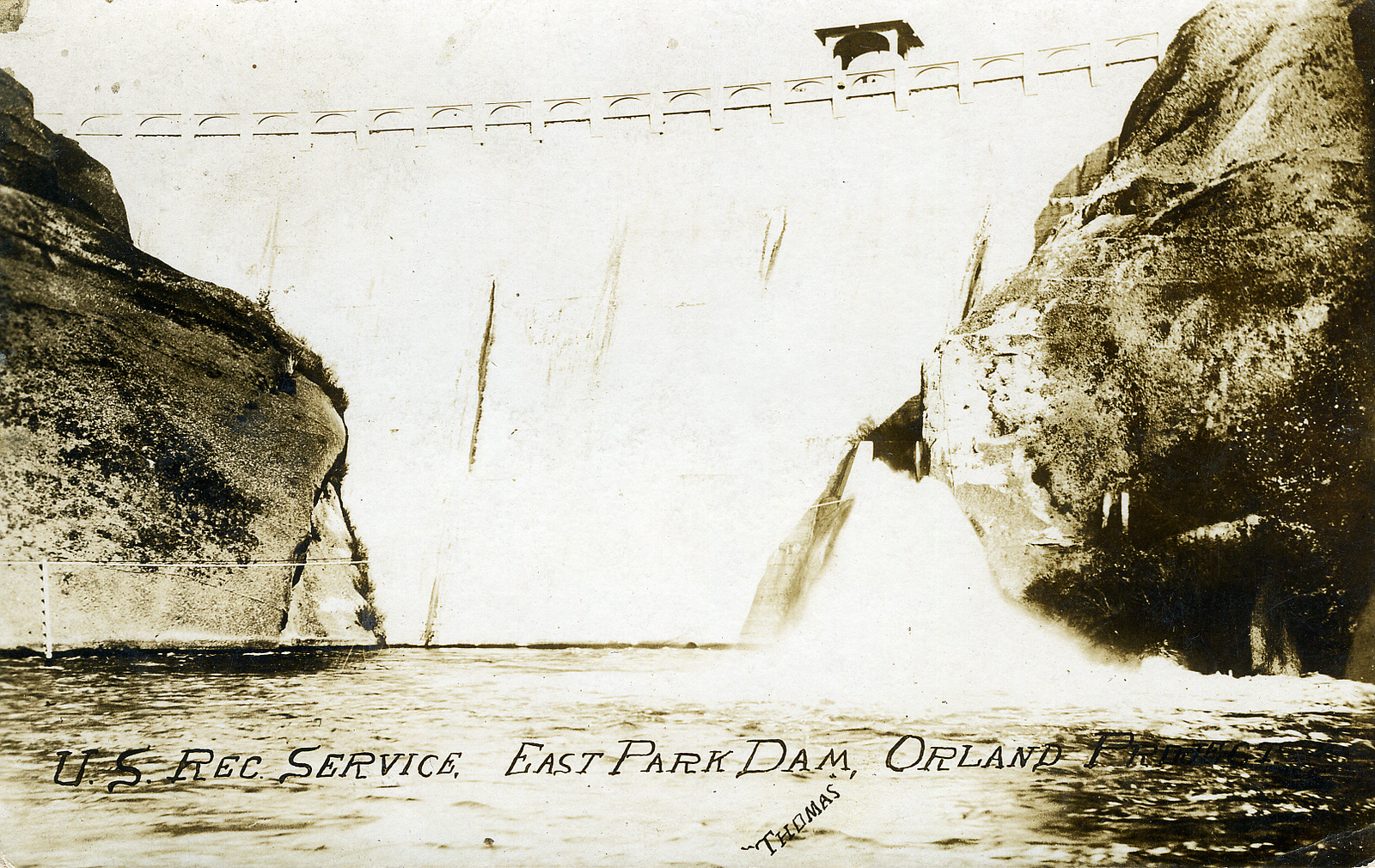
- Dam face
- Interactive map of East Park Dam
- Country: United States
- Location: California Central Valley
- Purpose: Irrigation
- Status: Operational
- Construction began: 1908
- Opening date: 1910
- Built by: United States Bureau of Reclamation
- Operator: Orland Unit Water Users' Association

Dam and spillways
- Type of dam: Arch-gravity dam
- Impounds: Little Stony Creek
- Height (foundation): 139 feet (42 m)
- Height (thalweg): 90 feet (27 m)
- Length: 266 feet (81 m) (crest)
- Elevation at crest: 1,199 feet (365 m)
- Width (crest): 10 feet (3.0 m)
- Dam volume: 12,400 cubic yards (9,500 m^{3})
- Spillways: 2 sluice gates
- Spillway capacity: 9,200 cubic feet per second (260 m^{3}/s)

Reservoir
- Total capacity: 52,000 acre-feet (64,000 ML)
- Catchment area: 1,820 acres (740 ha)

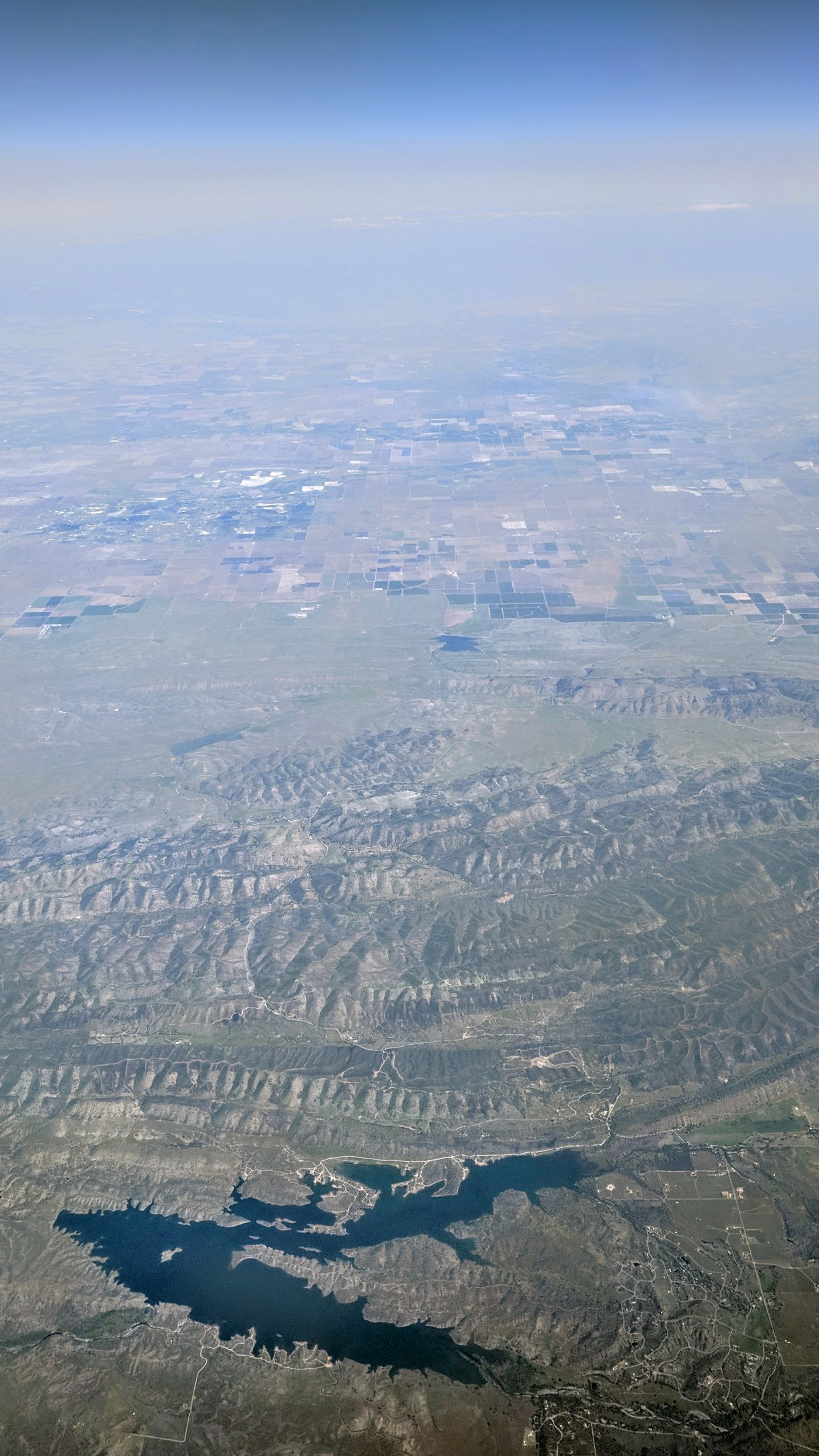
Aerial view of East Park Reservoir from the west

East Park Dam is an agricultural irrigation dam and reservoir built by the United States Bureau of Reclamation, on Little Stony Creek, about 30 miles (48 km) southwest of Orland, California on the northern end of the California Central Valley.

The dam was completed in 1910 (116 years ago). Its main structure is a curved, thick-arch concrete gravity dam, 92 feet (28 m) high, with two sluice gates. The control house is in the shape of a pagoda, and the spillway, about 2,000 feet (610 m) south of the dam on the western side of the reservoir, features an eccentric set of curved labyrinth-spillway fins. The reservoir has a storage capacity of 51,000 acre-feet (63,000,000 m^{3}).

The California Office of Environmental Health Hazard Assessment (OEHHA) has developed an advisory for the East Park Reservoir based on mercury and PCBs found in fish caught from this water body. The advisory provides safe eating advice for species caught in the body of water.

== The Orland Project ==
The East Park dam and reservoir was one element of the Orland Project in the area, one of the earliest, and one of the smallest, ever undertaken by the Bureau. Other components of the project include:

- the 1928 Stony Gorge Dam and Reservoir, on Stony Creek about 18 miles downstream from East Park Dam, an early example of an Ambursen-type dam
- the 1914 Rainbow Diversion Dam
- the 1913 Northside Diversion Dam, rebuilt in the 1950s
- and a canal and distribution system with 17 miles of canals and 117 miles of lateral connections

Still functioning, the local Orland Unit Water Users' Association has operated the project since October 1, 1954. It was added to the National Register of Historic Places in the 1980s.

== Climate ==
According to the Köppen Climate Classification system, East Park Reservoir has a hot-summer mediterranean climate, abbreviated "Csa" on climate maps. The hottest temperature recorded at East Park Reservoir was 115 °F (46.1 °C) on July 20, 1988 and July 30, 2003, while the coldest temperature recorded was 3 °F (−16.1 °C) on December 11, 1932.

Climate data for East Park Reservoir, California, 1991–2020 normals, extremes 1910–2003
Month	Jan	Feb	Mar	Apr	May	Jun	Jul	Aug	Sep	Oct	Nov	Dec	Year
Record high °F (°C)	80 (27)	81 (27)	92 (33)	95 (35)	104 (40)	112 (44)	115 (46)	114 (46)	110 (43)	102 (39)	89 (32)	80 (27)	115 (46)
Mean maximum °F (°C)	68.0 (20.0)	70.6 (21.4)	74.8 (23.8)	82.7 (28.2)	93.7 (34.3)	101.2 (38.4)	105.0 (40.6)	104.8 (40.4)	100.1 (37.8)	92.6 (33.7)	77.7 (25.4)	68.4 (20.2)	107.3 (41.8)
Mean daily maximum °F (°C)	56.7 (13.7)	59.3 (15.2)	63.3 (17.4)	69.4 (20.8)	78.1 (25.6)	87.8 (31.0)	94.2 (34.6)	93.1 (33.9)	89.4 (31.9)	78.9 (26.1)	64.9 (18.3)	56.8 (13.8)	74.3 (23.5)
Daily mean °F (°C)	44.4 (6.9)	47.0 (8.3)	50.7 (10.4)	55.2 (12.9)	63.0 (17.2)	70.9 (21.6)	77.0 (25.0)	75.1 (23.9)	70.7 (21.5)	62.1 (16.7)	50.9 (10.5)	44.6 (7.0)	59.3 (15.2)
Mean daily minimum °F (°C)	32.0 (0.0)	34.6 (1.4)	38.1 (3.4)	41.1 (5.1)	47.9 (8.8)	53.9 (12.2)	59.7 (15.4)	57.0 (13.9)	52.0 (11.1)	45.3 (7.4)	36.9 (2.7)	32.3 (0.2)	44.2 (6.8)
Mean minimum °F (°C)	21.0 (−6.1)	24.9 (−3.9)	27.4 (−2.6)	31.0 (−0.6)	35.1 (1.7)	41.7 (5.4)	48.6 (9.2)	48.1 (8.9)	42.8 (6.0)	34.3 (1.3)	25.4 (−3.7)	21.4 (−5.9)	18.3 (−7.6)
Record low °F (°C)	10 (−12)	16 (−9)	20 (−7)	20 (−7)	26 (−3)	31 (−1)	40 (4)	41 (5)	35 (2)	24 (−4)	17 (−8)	3 (−16)	3 (−16)
Average precipitation inches (mm)	4.98 (126)	4.49 (114)	2.84 (72)	1.18 (30)	0.93 (24)	0.33 (8.4)	0.02 (0.51)	0.05 (1.3)	0.15 (3.8)	0.87 (22)	2.13 (54)	3.79 (96)	21.76 (552.01)
Average snowfall inches (cm)	0.7 (1.8)	0.7 (1.8)	0.0 (0.0)	0.0 (0.0)	0.0 (0.0)	0.0 (0.0)	0.0 (0.0)	0.0 (0.0)	0.0 (0.0)	0.0 (0.0)	0.0 (0.0)	0.0 (0.0)	1.4 (3.6)
Average precipitation days (≥ 0.01 in)	11.8	9.6	7.6	4.4	3.5	1.6	0.2	0.5	0.5	2.4	6.8	8.8	57.7
Average snowy days (≥ 0.1 in)	0.2	0.2	0.0	0.0	0.0	0.0	0.0	0.0	0.0	0.0	0.0	0.0	0.4
Source 1: NOAA
Source 2: XMACIS2 (mean maxima/minima 1971–2000)

== See also ==
- List of dams and reservoirs in California
