= Black Butte Lake =

Lake located the United States of America

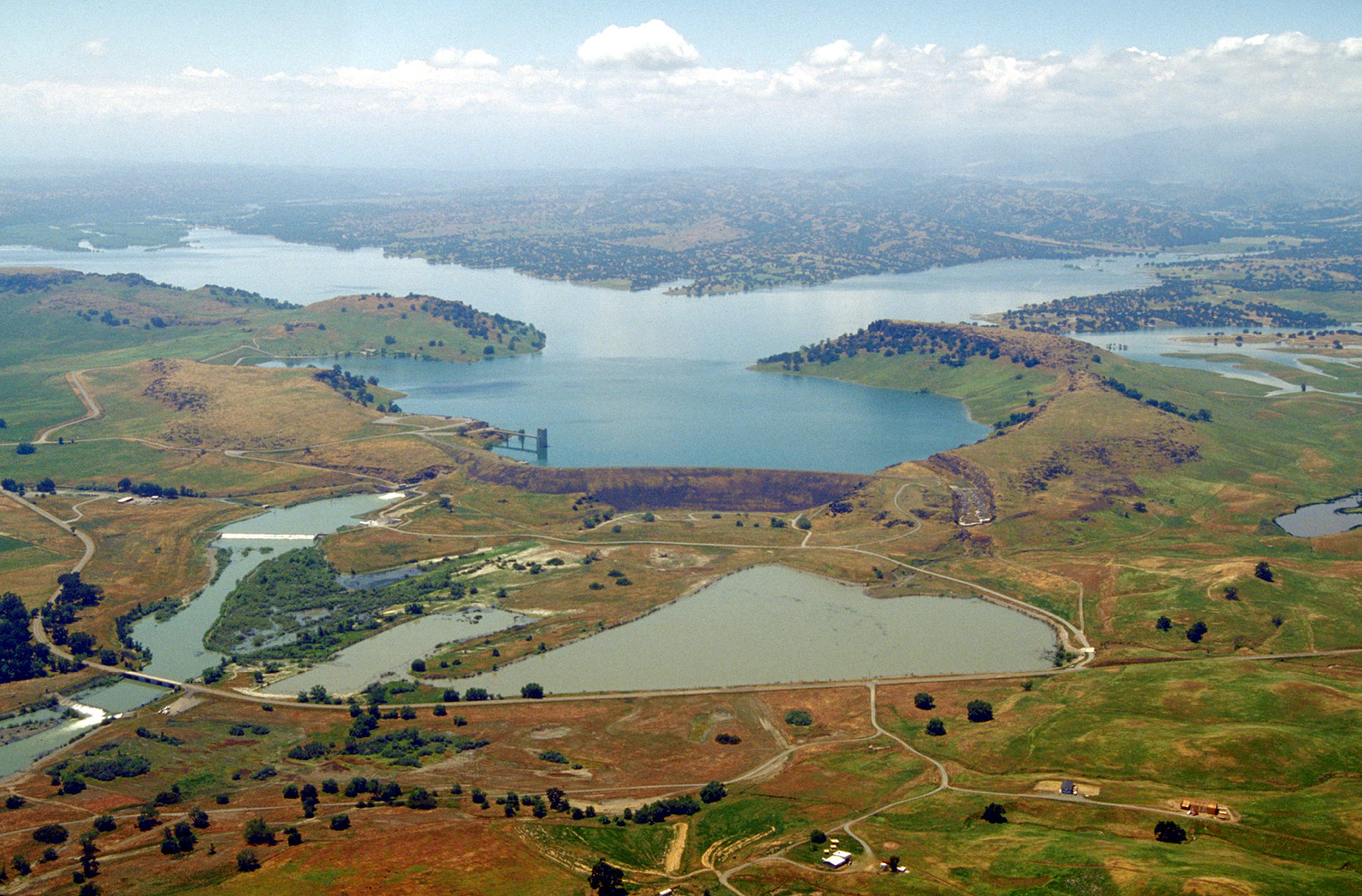
- Black Butte Dam and Lake

- Location within California Location within the United States
- Location: Glenn / Tehama counties, California, United States
- Coordinates: 39°48′21″N 122°21′28″W
- Type: reservoir
- Primary inflows: Stony Creek
- Primary outflows: Stony Creek
- Catchment area: 741 square miles (1,920 km^{2})
- Basin countries: United States
- Max. length: 7 mi (11.3 km)
- Surface area: 4,460 acres (1,800 ha)
- Water volume: 143,700 acre-feet (177,300,000 m^{3})
- Shore length^{1}: 40 miles (64 km)
- Surface elevation: 512 feet (156 m)
- ^{1} Shore length is not a well-defined measure.

Black Butte Lake is an artificial lake located in Tehama and Glenn counties in the U.S. state of California. The lake was formed from Stony Creek in 1963 (63 years ago) upon the completion of Black Butte Dam by the U.S. Army Corps of Engineers. The dam is located approximately 9 miles (14.5 km) west of Orland. At full pool, the lake is 7 miles (11.3 km) long and has a shoreline of 40 miles (64.4 km) and a surface area of 4,460 acres (18 km^{2}). The dam and lake were constructed for flood protection for local towns and agricultural lands.

The California Office of Environmental Health Hazard Assessment released a warning regarding eating fish caught from this lake based on the elevated mercury level.

== See also ==
- List of dams and reservoirs in California
- List of lakes in California
- Orland Buttes
