= Meadowood Estates, California =

Meadowood Estates
- Former Unincorporated community
- Location in California
- Coordinates: 39°45′07″N 122°10′49″W
- Country: United States
- State: California
- County: Glenn
- Elevation: 253 ft (77 m)

Meadowood Estates is a former unincorporated community in Glenn County, California, United States, now incorporated in Orland. It lies at an elevation of 253 feet (77 m).
