= Nils F. Ambursen =

Norwegian-American civil engineer and inventor

- Born: 1876; Norway
- Died: January 16, 1953 (aged 76–77); Newton, Massachusetts, U.S.
- Occupations: Civil engineer, Inventor
- Known for: Ambursen dam (Hollow buttress dam)
- Engineering career
- Projects: Ambursen Hydraulic Construction Company
- Significant design: Reinforced concrete buttress dam (1903 patent)

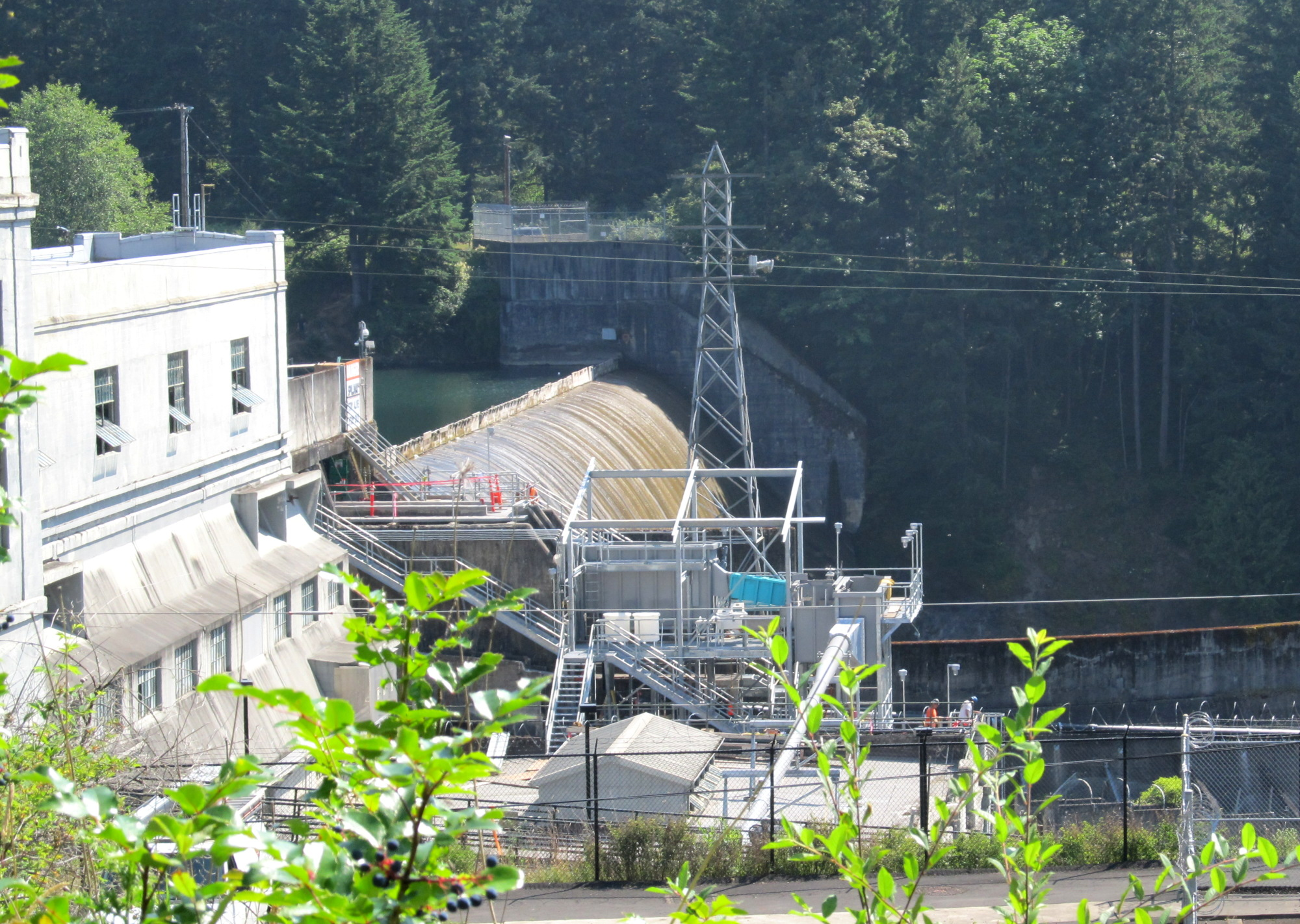
River Mill Dam, Estacada, Oregon, constructed in 1911

Nils F. Ambursen (February 6, 1876 – January 17, 1953) was a Norwegian-American civil engineer and inventor. He was the founder of Ambursen Hydraulic Construction Company and was known for his influential dam designs in the early 20th century.

== Early life and education ==
Ambursen was born at Fredrikstad in Østfold, Norway and was educated at the Telemark Civil Engineering College (Telemark ingeniørhøgskole) in Skien, Telemark. Ambursen came to the United States by the age of 21.

== Career ==
Working for the B. F. Sturtevant Company in Hyde Park, Boston, Massachusetts, in 1903, Ambursen developed an innovative concrete slab and buttress dam for an industrial client in Theresa, New York. Ambursen's design was for a buttress dam requiring minimal buttress thickness in which the upstream part is a relatively thin flat slab typically made of reinforced concrete. Ambursen's concrete-slab-and-buttress design used far less material than a traditional gravity dam making it both a significant engineering advance and cost effective for clients.

Ambursen promptly filed a patent on his own behalf and organized the Ambursen Hydraulic Construction Company, based in Boston. From 1903 through 1917, the company used the technique to construct more than one hundred dams in North America, most in New England. The record-breaking 41-meter-tall (135-foot) La Prele Dam in Converse County, Wyoming used 43 percent less concrete than an equivalent concrete gravity dam. The structure allowed an interior hollow under the spillway; the 1907 Bloede's Dam on the Patapsco River in Maryland housed its hydroelectric power plant inside that hollow and therefore "under water". The company sued to preserve its patents fairly aggressively but with mixed success. In some cases, the Ambursen dam became a more generic "Ambursen type", for instance at the 1911 Lock and Dam No. 1 on the Upper Mississippi River between Minneapolis and Saint Paul, Minnesota. Civil engineer George Freeman received his own November 1912 patent on a modified version of the concrete buttress dam used there.

In 1917, Ambursen left his company, which has continued to bear his name for over a hundred years. Today perhaps fifty Ambursen-type dams from the post-World War II era stand outside the United States. The tallest example, 83 meters (272 ft), is the 1948 Escaba Dam (Dique Escaba) in Tucumán, Argentina.

== Work ==
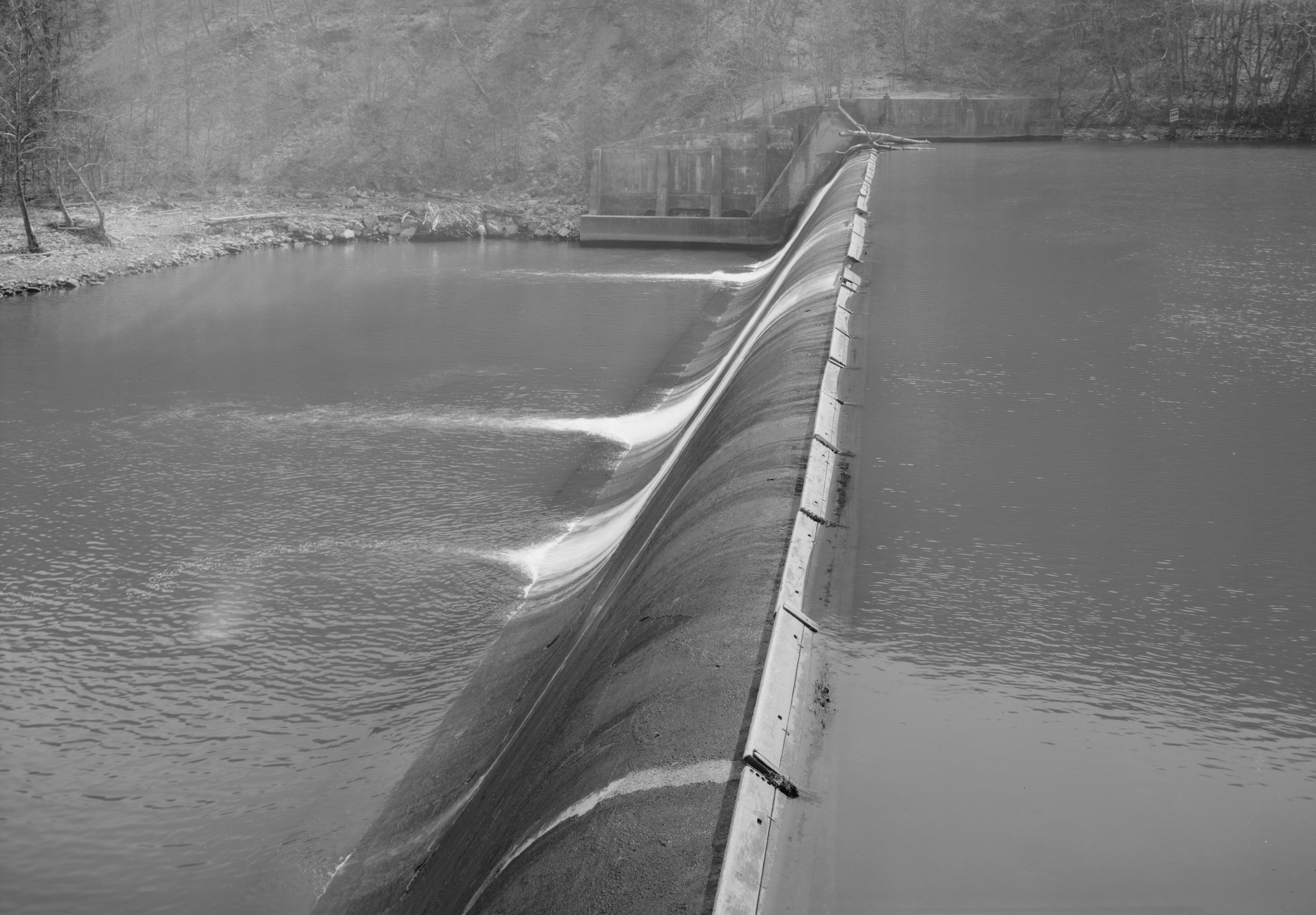
Warrior Ridge Dam, Huntingdon County, Pennsylvania, constructed in 1906

Ambursen's designs include:

(all dams listed located in the United States)

- Warrior Ridge Dam (1906) in Huntingdon County, Pennsylvania; "the focus of widespread attention in the engineering press"
- Ellsworth Dam (1907) in Ellsworth, Maine
- Bloede's Dam (1907) in Ilchester, Maryland
- Ashley Dam (1907–1908; undermined 1909) on the [[Ashley Brook]] near Pittsfield, Massachusetts
- La Prele Dam (1908–1909; refurbished in 1977, breach planned prior to spring 2025 runoff) near Douglas, Wyoming
- Rapidan Dam (1908–1910) on the Blue Earth River, Rapidan Township, Minnesota
- River Mill Dam (1911) in Estacada, Oregon; on the National Register of Historic Places
- Powersite Dam (1911–1913) in Forsyth, Missouri
- Overholser Dam (1917–1918) in Oklahoma City, Oklahoma; on the National Register of Historic Places
- Remmel Dam (1924) impounding Lake Catherine, Jones Mill, Arkansas; on the National Register of Historic Places
- Stony Gorge Dam (1926–1928) in Glenn County, California.

== See also ==
- List of civil engineers
- List of inventors
- List of Norwegians
- List of people from Boston

== Related reading ==
- Lyon, William K.; George W Petersen (1921) Comparative designs of Gravity and Ambursen dams (Armour Institute of Technology) ISBN 978-1175660305
- Hager, Willi H. (2015) Hydraulicians in the USA 1800-2000: A biographical dictionary of leaders in hydraulic engineering and fluid mechanics (Boca Raton, FL: CRC Press) ISBN 9781315680125
