= Stony Gorge Dam =

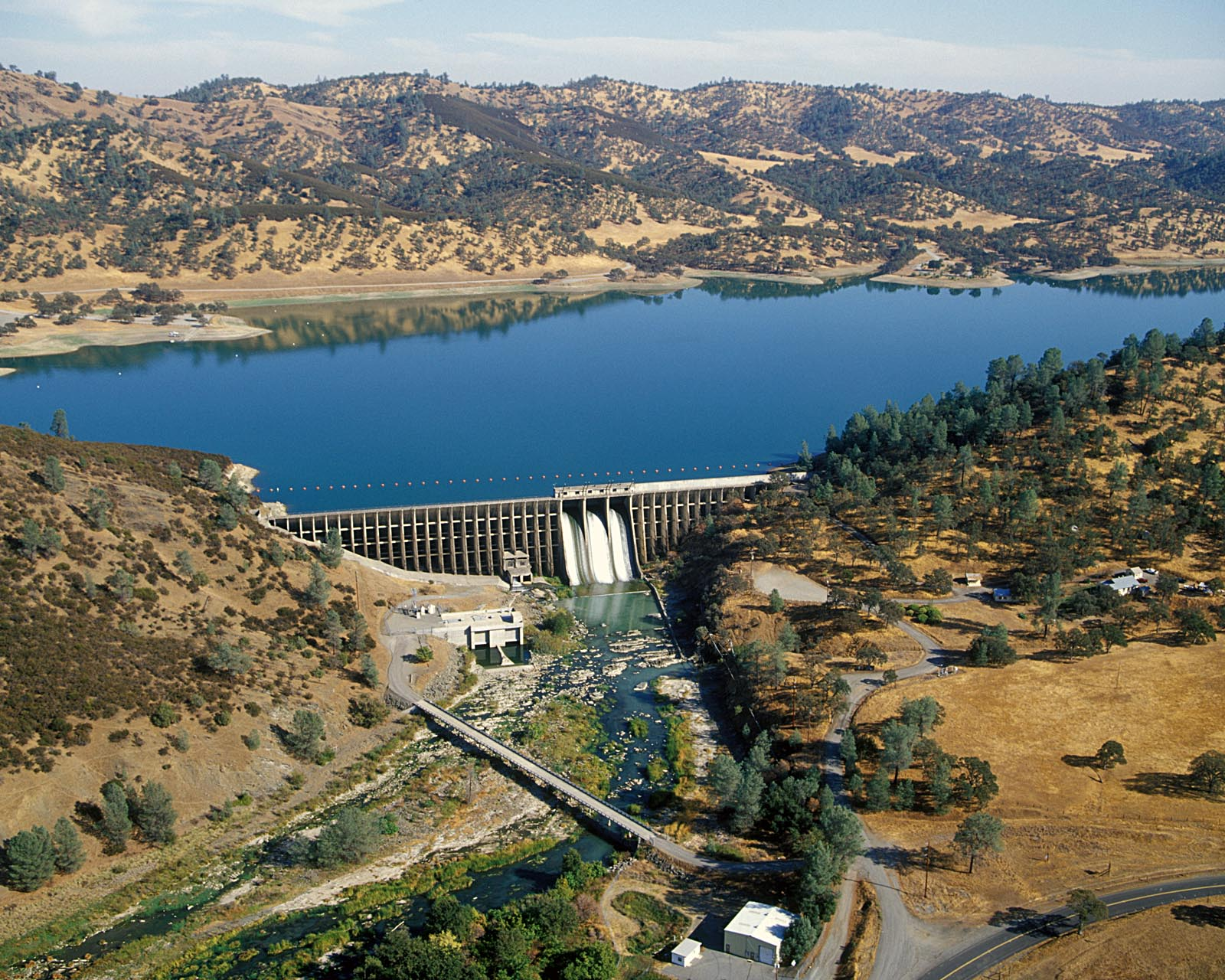
- Stony Gorge Dam
- Interactive map of Stony Gorge Dam
- Location: Glenn County, California
- Coordinates: 39°35′11″N 122°31′56″W
- Opening date: 1926; 100 years ago

Dam and spillways
- Height: 153 ft (47 m)
- Length: 868 ft (265 m)

Reservoir
- Creates: Stony Gorge Reservoir
- Total capacity: 58,500 acre⋅ft (72,200,000 m^{3})
- Surface area: 1,280 acres (520 ha)

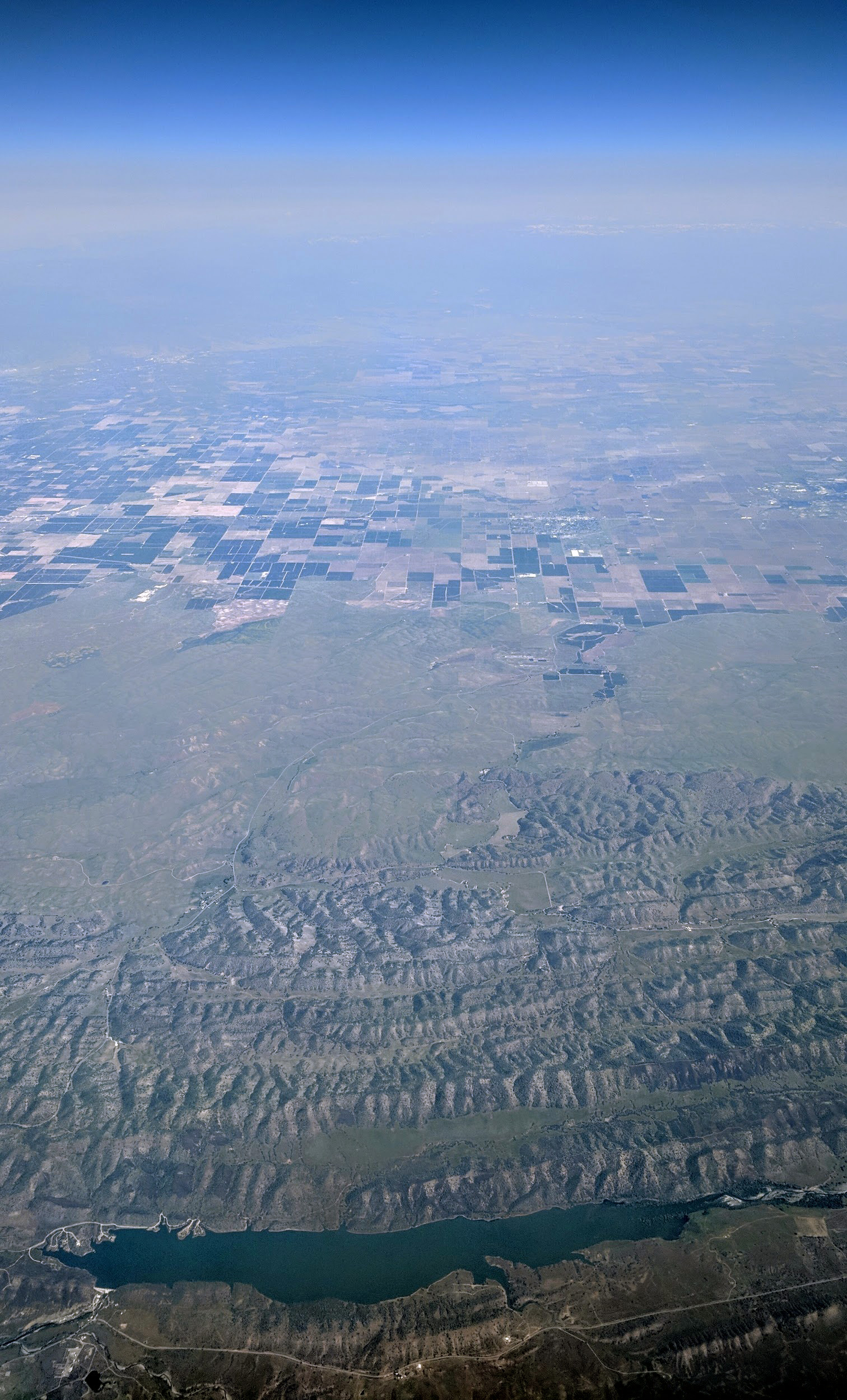
Aerial view of Stony Gorge Reservoir from the west

Stony Gorge Dam (National ID # CA10194) is a dam in Glenn County, California.

The concrete buttress dam was constructed between 1926 (100 years ago) and 1928 (98 years ago) by the United States Bureau of Reclamation, with a height of 153 feet (47 m) and 868 feet (265 m) long at its crest. Structurally it is a relatively early example of an Ambursen-type dam, using contraction joints between all face slabs and buttresses for stability.

It impounds Stony Creek for irrigation storage and flood control. Hydroelectric power is also produced. Along with the East Park Dam about 15 miles (24 km) upstream, it is part of the Orland Project in the Sacramento valley, one of the Bureau of Reclamation's first generation of water projects. The dam is owned by the Bureau and is operated by the local Orland Unit Water Users` Association.

The reservoir it creates, Stony Gorge Reservoir, has a water surface of 1,280 acres (520 ha), a shoreline of about 18 miles (29 km), and a maximum capacity of 58,500 acre-feet (72,200,000 m^{3}). Recreation includes camping, boating, and fishing (for largemouth bass, smallmouth bass, bluegill, crappie, and catfish). The California Office of Environmental Health Hazard Assessment (OEHHA) has developed a safe eating advisory for fish caught in the Stony Gorge Dam based on levels of mercury or PCBs found in local species.

== See also ==
- List of dams and reservoirs in California
- List of lakes in California
