= Elk Creek, California =

Elk Creek
- census-designated place
- Location of Elk Creek in Glenn County, California.

- Location in California
- Coordinates: 39°36′19″N 122°32′21″W
- Country: United States
- State: California
- County: Glenn

Area
  - Total: 1.507 sq mi (3.902 km^{2})
  - Land: 1.475 sq mi (3.821 km^{2})
  - Water: 0.032 sq mi (0.082 km^{2}) 2.09%
- Elevation: 745 ft (227 m)

Population (2020)
  - Total: 138
  - Density: 93.5/sq mi (36.1/km^{2})
- Time zone: UTC-8 (Pacific (PST))
  - Summer (DST): UTC-7 (PDT)
- GNIS feature IDs: 1655993; 2628728

Elk Creek is a census-designated place in Glenn County, California, United States. It is located 19 miles (31 km) northwest of Willows, at an elevation of 745 feet (227 m).

The 2020 census reported that Elk Creek's population was 138. It is home to the smallest public high school in California, which has an enrollment of about 35 students in grades 7 through 12. The Grindstone Indian Rancheria of Wintun-Wailaki Indians, founded in 1907, is located approximately seven miles north of the town and conducts business in Elk Creek. The best-known landmark nearby is a mountain named Bidwell Point.

The first post office at Elk Creek opened in 1872.

The town of Elk Creek is just north of Stony Gorge Reservoir. Elk Creek, the town's namesake, runs out of the Coast Range mountains to the east into Stony Creek. Stony Creek runs from the dam at Stony Gorge into another lake a bit further up the map called Black Butte Lake. Hunting is restricted to shotguns and bows.

== Demographics ==
Historical population
Census	Pop.	Note	%±
2010	163		—
2020	138		−15.3%
U.S. Decennial Census

The 2020 United States census reported that Elk Creek had a population of 138. The population density was 93.6 inhabitants per square mile (36.1/km^{2}). The racial makeup of Elk Creek was 120 (87.0%) White, 1 (0.7%) African American, 4 (2.9%) Native American, 0 (0.0%) Asian, 2 (1.4%) Pacific Islander, 3 (2.2%) from other races, and 8 (5.8%) from two or more races. Hispanic or Latino of any race were 8 persons (5.8%).

The whole population lived in households. There were 58 households, out of which 7 (12.1%) had children under the age of 18 living in them, 20 (34.5%) were married-couple households, 0 (0.0%) were cohabiting couple households, 7 (12.1%) had a female householder with no partner present, and 31 (53.4%) had a male householder with no partner present. 29 households (50.0%) were one person, and 13 (22.4%) were one person aged 65 or older. The average household size was 2.38. There were 28 families (48.3% of all households).

The age distribution was 23 people (16.7%) under the age of 18, 1 people (0.7%) aged 18 to 24, 11 people (8.0%) aged 25 to 44, 51 people (37.0%) aged 45 to 64, and 52 people (37.7%) who were 65 years of age or older. The median age was 61.1 years. There were 73 males and 65 females.

There were 80 housing units at an average density of 54.2 units per square mile (20.9 units/km^{2}), of which 58 (72.5%) were occupied. Of these, 35 (60.3%) were owner-occupied, and 23 (39.7%) were occupied by renters.

== Climate ==
This region experiences hot and dry summers with temperatures reaching up to 115 degrees.

According to the Köppen Climate Classification system, Elk Creek has a hot-summer Mediterranean climate, abbreviated "Csa" on climate maps.

Climate data for Stony Gorge Reservoir, California, 1991–2020 normals, extremes 1926–present
Month	Jan	Feb	Mar	Apr	May	Jun	Jul	Aug	Sep	Oct	Nov	Dec	Year
Record high °F (°C)	82 (28)	81 (27)	87 (31)	95 (35)	106 (41)	113 (45)	116 (47)	115 (46)	114 (46)	104 (40)	89 (32)	80 (27)	116 (47)
Mean maximum °F (°C)	69.8 (21.0)	72.9 (22.7)	78.6 (25.9)	86.4 (30.2)	95.1 (35.1)	104.1 (40.1)	107.5 (41.9)	105.8 (41.0)	103.2 (39.6)	93.8 (34.3)	80.5 (26.9)	68.8 (20.4)	109.4 (43.0)
Mean daily maximum °F (°C)	56.1 (13.4)	59.6 (15.3)	64.2 (17.9)	70.2 (21.2)	79.5 (26.4)	89.0 (31.7)	95.9 (35.5)	94.6 (34.8)	90.1 (32.3)	78.6 (25.9)	64.2 (17.9)	55.6 (13.1)	74.8 (23.8)
Daily mean °F (°C)	44.9 (7.2)	47.5 (8.6)	51.1 (10.6)	55.7 (13.2)	63.7 (17.6)	72.1 (22.3)	78.4 (25.8)	76.7 (24.8)	71.9 (22.2)	62.1 (16.7)	50.8 (10.4)	44.3 (6.8)	59.9 (15.5)
Mean daily minimum °F (°C)	33.8 (1.0)	35.5 (1.9)	38.0 (3.3)	41.1 (5.1)	47.8 (8.8)	55.1 (12.8)	60.9 (16.1)	58.8 (14.9)	53.6 (12.0)	45.6 (7.6)	37.4 (3.0)	33.0 (0.6)	45.1 (7.3)
Mean minimum °F (°C)	23.0 (−5.0)	25.4 (−3.7)	29.4 (−1.4)	34.5 (1.4)	42.4 (5.8)	48.1 (8.9)	56.3 (13.5)	55.7 (13.2)	48.5 (9.2)	37.0 (2.8)	26.0 (−3.3)	21.3 (−5.9)	19.5 (−6.9)
Record low °F (°C)	13 (−11)	14 (−10)	21 (−6)	20 (−7)	28 (−2)	37 (3)	47 (8)	46 (8)	34 (1)	26 (−3)	20 (−7)	5 (−15)	5 (−15)
Average precipitation inches (mm)	4.50 (114)	4.02 (102)	2.75 (70)	1.35 (34)	1.07 (27)	0.54 (14)	0.05 (1.3)	0.05 (1.3)	0.12 (3.0)	0.93 (24)	2.00 (51)	3.98 (101)	21.36 (543)
Average precipitation days (≥ 0.01 in)	11.7	9.7	9.3	5.7	5.0	2.0	0.3	0.4	1.0	3.5	7.4	11.7	67.7
Source: NOAA

== Education ==
The CDP is served by the Stony Creek Joint Unified School District.
