= Grindstone Indian Rancheria of Wintun-Wailaki Indians =

Coordinates: 39°40′19″N 122°31′05″W

Total population
- 162

Regions with significant populations
- United States ( California)

Languages
- English

Religion
- Roundhouse religion, Kuksu, Christianity

Related ethnic groups
- other Wintun and Wailaki peoples

The Grindstone Indian Rancheria of Wintun-Wailaki Indians is a federally recognized tribe and ranchería of Wintun and Wailaki Indians from northern California. As of the 2010 Census the population was 164.

== Reservation ==
Location of the Grindstone Rancheria

The tribe's reservation is the Grindstone Rancheria, located in Glenn County, California. It was founded in 1907 and covers an area of 120 acres (0.49 km^{2}). Approximately 98 of the tribe's 162 members live on the rancheria. The nearest neighboring community is Elk Creek, situated about 5 miles to the south.

== Education ==
The reservation is served by the Stony Creek Joint Unified School District.

== Government ==
The Grindstone Indian Rancheria is governed by a democratically elected tribal council. They are headquartered in Elk Creek, California, and their current tribal chairperson is Ronald Kirk.

== Language ==
Traditionally, the members of tribe spoke the Wailaki language or the Wintun, a Wintuan language of the Penutian language family, but the former is extinct and the latter has few speakers.
