= Glenn County, California =

County in California, United States

Coordinates: 39.59°N 122.39°W

Glenn County
- County
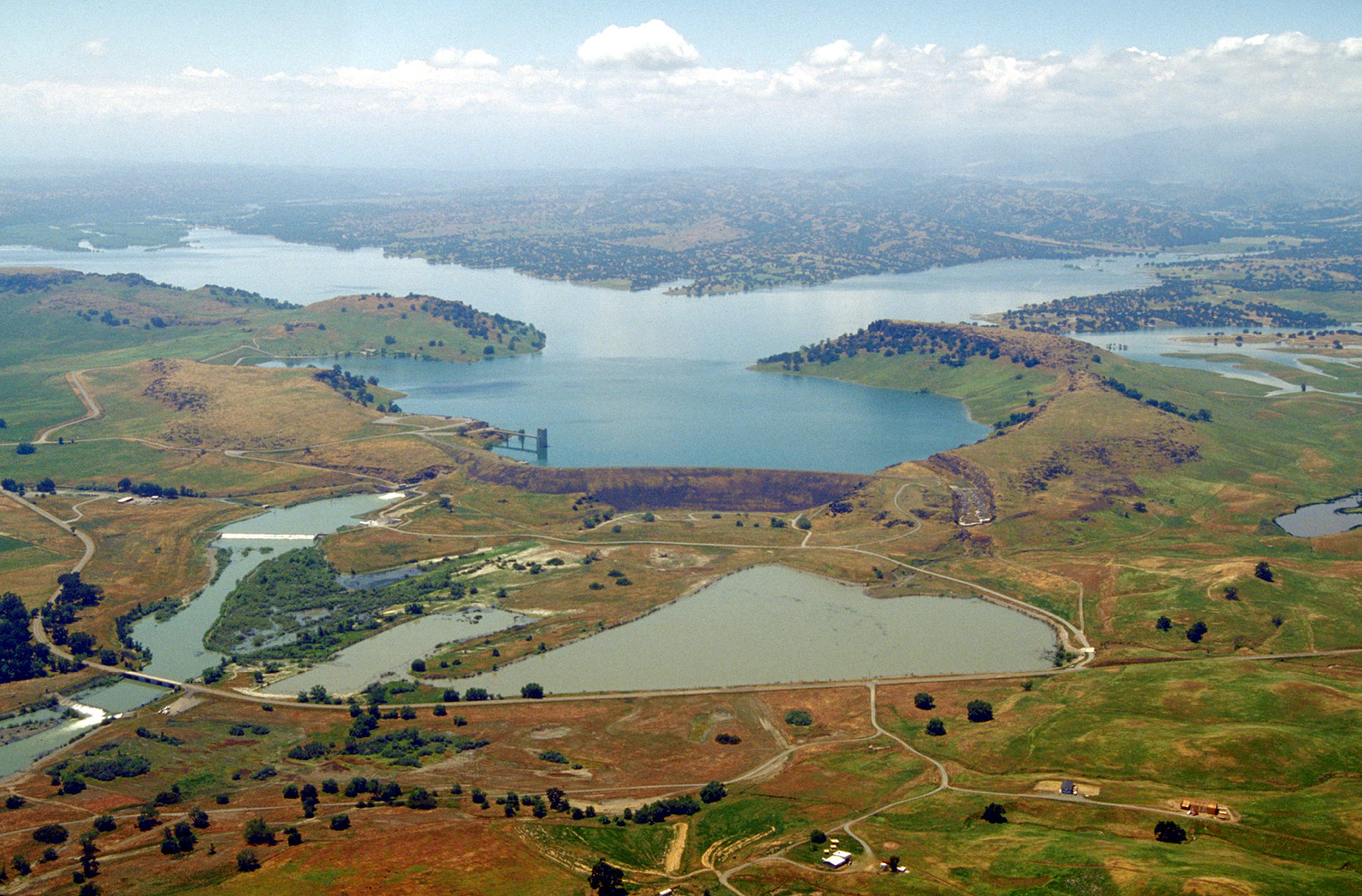
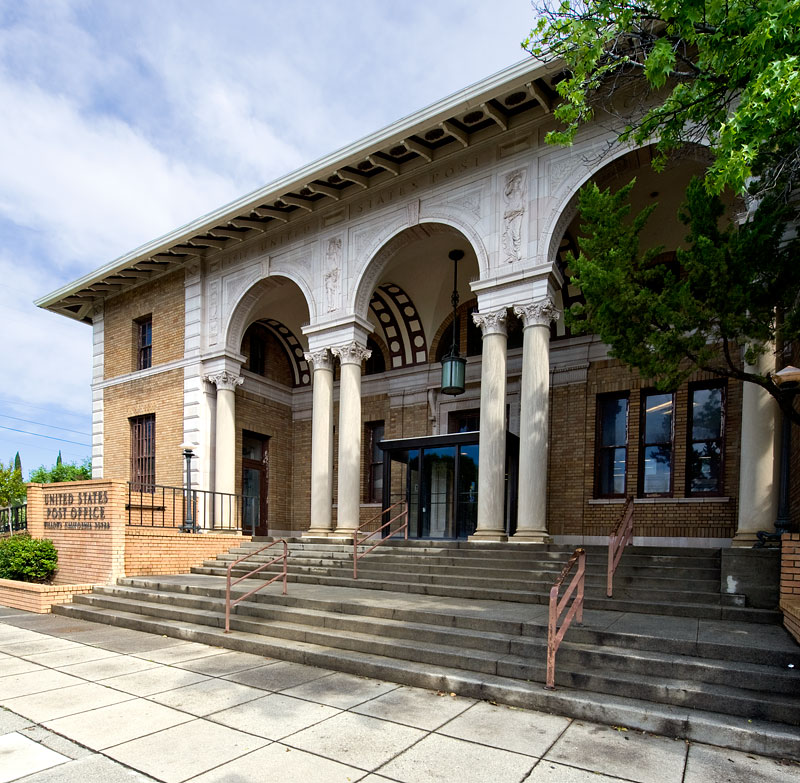
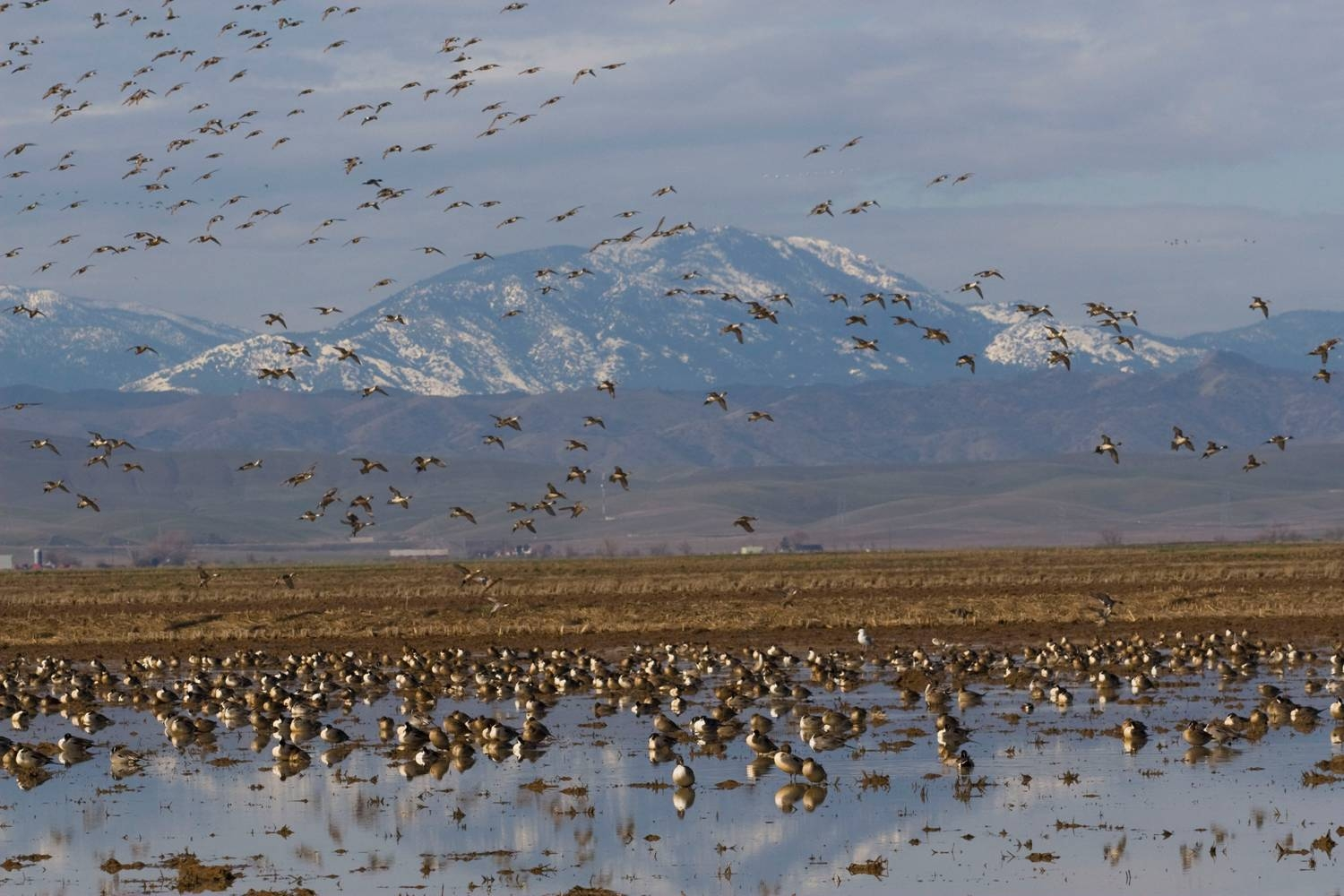
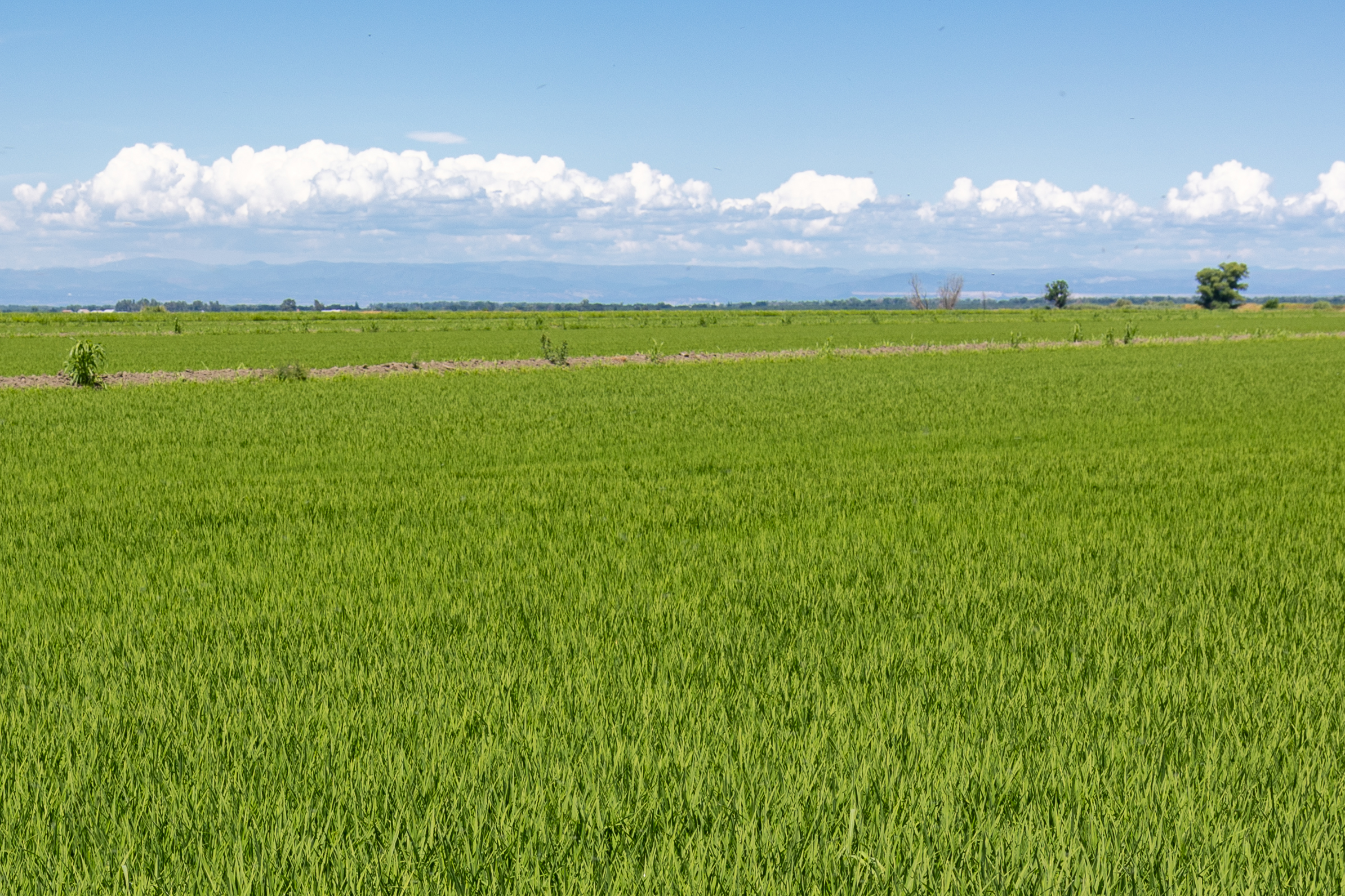
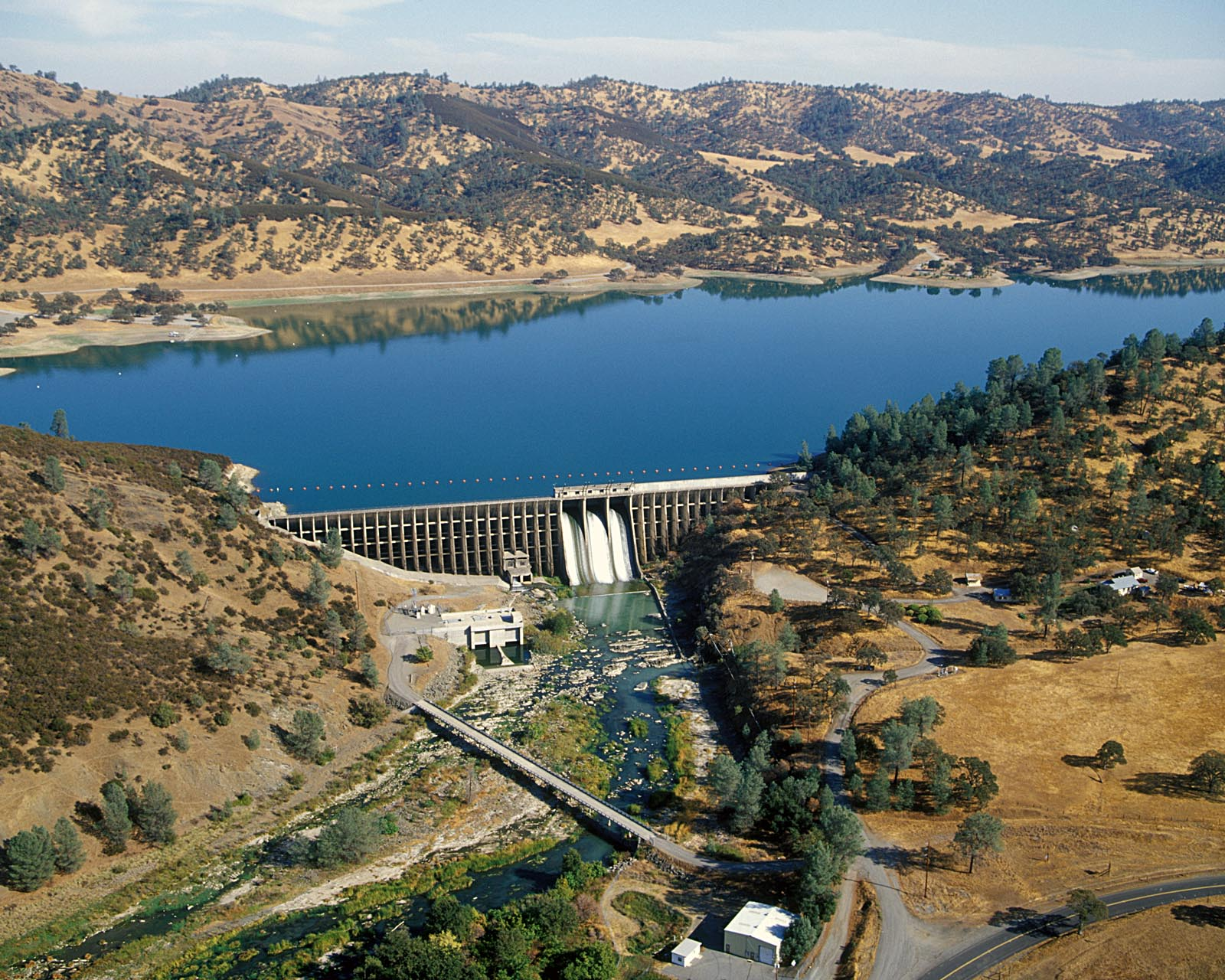
- Black Butte Lake and Black Butte Dam Willows Sacramento Wildlife Refuge Codora Stony Gorge Dam

- Seal

- Location in the state of California
- Interactive map of Glenn County
- Country: United States
- State: California
- Region: Sacramento Valley
- Incorporated: 1891
- Named for: Hugh J. Glenn
- County seat: Willows
- Largest city: Orland

Government
  - Type: Council–CAO
  - Chair: Grant Carmon
  - Vice Chair: Tony Arendt
  - Board of Supervisors: Supervisors: Grant Carmon; Monica Rossman; Tony Arendt; Jim Yoder; Jake Withrow
  - County Administrative Officer: Scott De Moss

Area
  - Total: 1,327 sq mi (3,440 km^{2})
  - Land: 1,314 sq mi (3,400 km^{2})
  - Water: 13 sq mi (34 km^{2})
- Highest elevation: 7,451 ft (2,271 m)

Population (2020)
  - Total: 28,917
  - Estimate (2025): 28,141 ▼
  - Density: 22.01/sq mi (8.497/km^{2})

GDP
  - Total: $1.249 billion (2022)
- Time zone: UTC−8 (Pacific)
  - Summer (DST): UTC−7 (Pacific Daylight Time)
- Area code: 530
- FIPS code: 06-021
- GNIS feature ID: 277275
- Congressional district: 1st
- Website: Glenn County, California

Glenn County is a county located in the U.S. state of California. As of the 2020 census, the population was 28,917. The county seat is Willows. It is located in the Sacramento Valley, in the northern part of the California Central Valley. The reservation of the Grindstone Indian Rancheria of Wintun-Wailaki Indians is located in Glenn County.

== History ==
Glenn County split from Colusa County in 1891. It was named for Dr. Hugh J. Glenn, who purchased 8,000 acres (32.4 km^{2}) in the northeast end of Rancho Jacinto in 1867. He became the largest wheat farmer in the state during his lifetime and a man of great prominence in political and commercial life in California.

== Geography ==
According to the U.S. Census Bureau, the county has a total area of 1,327 square miles (3,440 km^{2}), of which 1,314 square miles (3,400 km^{2}) is land and 13 square miles (34 km^{2}) (1.0%) is water.

=== Adjacent counties ===
- Colusa County - south
- Lake County - southwest
- Mendocino County - west
- Tehama County - north
- Butte County - east

=== National protected areas ===
- Mendocino National Forest (part)
- Sacramento National Wildlife Refuge (part)
- Sacramento River National Wildlife Refuge (part)

== Demographics ==
Historical population
Census	Pop.	Note	%±
1900	5,150		—
1910	7,172		39.3%
1920	11,853		65.3%
1930	10,935		−7.7%
1940	12,195		11.5%
1950	15,448		26.7%
1960	17,245		11.6%
1970	17,521		1.6%
1980	21,350		21.9%
1990	24,798		16.1%
2000	26,453		6.7%
2010	28,122		6.3%
2020	28,917		2.8%
2025 (est.)	28,141	▼	−2.7%
U.S. Decennial Census; 1790–1960 1900–1990; 1990–2000 2010 2020

=== 2020 census ===
As of the 2020 census, the county had a population of 28,917. The median age was 37.5 years, with 25.8% of residents under the age of 18 and 17.2% aged 65 years or older. For every 100 females there were 100.4 males, and for every 100 females age 18 and over there were 97.7 males age 18 and over.

The racial makeup of the county was 54.5% White, 0.6% Black or African American, 3.8% American Indian and Alaska Native, 2.2% Asian, 0.2% Native Hawaiian and Pacific Islander, 25.1% from some other race, and 13.6% from two or more races. Hispanic or Latino residents of any race comprised 43.4% of the population.

58.8% of residents lived in urban areas, while 41.2% lived in rural areas.

There were 10,177 households in the county, of which 37.6% had children under the age of 18 living with them and 23.5% had a female householder with no spouse or partner present. About 22.7% of all households were made up of individuals and 11.1% had someone living alone who was 65 years of age or older.

There were 10,895 housing units, of which 6.6% were vacant. Among occupied housing units, 61.5% were owner-occupied and 38.5% were renter-occupied. The homeowner vacancy rate was 0.9% and the rental vacancy rate was 3.5%.

=== Racial and ethnic composition ===
Glenn County, California – Racial and ethnic composition Note: the US Census treats Hispanic/Latino as an ethnic category. This table excludes Latinos from the racial categories and assigns them to a separate category. Hispanics/Latinos may be of any race.
Race / Ethnicity (NH = Non-Hispanic)	Pop 1980	Pop 1990	Pop 2000	Pop 2010	Pop 2020	% 1980	% 1990	% 2000	% 2010	% 2020
White alone (NH)	18,149	18,461	16,548	15,717	13,897	85.01%	74.45%	62.56%	55.89%	48.06%
Black or African American alone (NH)	54	131	117	192	140	0.25%	0.53%	0.44%	0.68%	0.48%
Native American or Alaska Native alone (NH)	353	447	439	477	531	1.65%	1.80%	1.66%	1.70%	1.84%
Asian alone (NH)	155	773	863	674	626	0.73%	3.12%	3.26%	2.40%	2.16%
Native Hawaiian or Pacific Islander alone (NH)	x	x	22	22	39	0.08%	0.08%	0.08%	0.08%	0.13%
Other race alone (NH)	107	28	55	39	144	0.50%	0.11%	0.21%	0.14%	0.50%
Mixed race or Multiracial (NH)	x	x	569	462	999	x	x	2.15%	1.64%	3.45%
Hispanic or Latino (any race)	2,532	4,958	7,840	10,539	12,541	11.86%	19.99%	29.64%	37.48%	43.37%
Total	21,350	24,798	26,453	28,122	28,917	100.00%	100.00%	100.00%	100.00%	100.00%

=== American Community Survey 2025 data ===
The United States Census Bureau estimated that in 2025, Glenn County’s population was 28.141. It was also estimated that the county's population was 44,76% Non-Hispanic White, 46,94% Hispanic or Latino, 0,64% Non-Hispanic Black, 2,21% Asian, 1,89% Native American, 0,11% Pacific Islander, and 3,45% Multiracial.

Total	Population	Percentage
Non-Hispanic White	12.595	44,76%
Hispanic or Latino	13.210	46,94%
Non-Hispanic Black	179	0,64%
Asian	623	2,21%
Native American	532	1,89%
Pacific Islander	31	0,11%
Non-Hispanic Multiracial	971	3,45%

=== 2010 census ===
The 2010 United States census reported that Glenn County had a population of 28,122. The racial makeup of Glenn County was 19,990 (71.1%) White, 231 (0.8%) African American, 619 (2.2%) Native American, 722 (2.6%) Asian, 24 (0.1%) Pacific Islander, 5,522 (19.6%) from other races, and 1,014 (3.6%) from two or more races. Hispanic or Latino of any race were 10,539 persons (37.5%).

Population reported at 2010 United States census
The County	Total; Population	White	African; American	Native; American	Asian	Pacific; Islander	other races	two or more races	Hispanic or Latino (of any race)
Glenn County	28,122	19,990	231	619	722	24	5,522	1,014	10,539
Incorporated cities	Total; Population	White	African; American	Native; American	Asian	Pacific; Islander	other races	two or more races	Hispanic or Latino (of any race)
Orland	7,291	4,828	37	122	208	1	1,833	262	3,269
Willows	6,166	4,304	78	138	312	11	1,099	224	2,020
Census-designated places	Total; Population	White	African; American	Native; American	Asian	Pacific; Islander	other races	two or more races	Hispanic or Latino (of any race)
Artois	295	245	0	8	3	0	25	14	54
Elk Creek	163	144	0	7	1	0	8	3	8
Hamilton City	1,759	834	18	23	15	0	804	65	1,489
Other unincorporated areas	Total; Population	White	African; American	Native; American	Asian	Pacific; Islander	other races	two or more races	Hispanic or Latino (of any race)
All others not CDPs (combined)	12,448	9,635	98	321	183	12	1,753	446	3,699

=== 2000 census ===
As of the census of 2000, there were 26,453 people, 9,172 households, and 6,732 families residing in the county. The population density was 20 people per square mile (7.7 people/km^{2}). There were 9,982 housing units at an average density of 8 units per square mile (3.1 units/km^{2}). The racial makeup of the county was 71.8% White, 0.6% Black or African American, 2.1% Native American, 3.4% Asian, 0.1% Pacific Islander, 18.2% from other races, and 3.9% from two or more races. 29.6% of the population were Hispanic or Latino of any race. 10.8% were of German, 9.4% American, 6.2% English and 5.9% Irish ancestry according to Census 2000. 69.5% spoke English, 27.0% Spanish and 2.1% Hmong as their first language. There were 9,172 households, out of which 38.1% had children under the age of 18 living with them, 56.7% were married couples living together, 10.9% had a female householder with no husband present, and 26.6% were non-families. 22.0% of all households were made up of individuals, and 10.7% had someone living alone who was 65 years of age or older. The average household size was 2.84 and the average family size was 3.33.

In the county, the population was spread out, with 30.8% under the age of 18, 8.7% from 18 to 24, 26.8% from 25 to 44, 20.7% from 45 to 64, and 13.0% who were 65 years of age or older. The median age was 34 years. For every 100 females there were 102.2 males. For every 100 females age 18 and over, there were 99.5 males. The median income for a household in the county was $32,107, and the median income for a family was $37,023. Males had a median income of $29,480 versus $21,766 for females. The per capita income for the county was $14,069. About 12.5% of families and 18.1% of the population were below the poverty line, including 26.3% of those under age 18 and 7.6% of those age 65 or over.

== Politics ==
=== Voter registration ===
Population and registered voters
Total population	28,027	
Registered voters (Note: Percentage of registered voters with respect to total population. Percentages of party members with respect to registered voters follow.)	12,266	43.8%
Democratic	3,761	30.7%
Republican	5,534	45.1%
	-1,773	-14.4%
American Independent	461	3.8%
Green	41	0.3%
Libertarian	74	0.6%
Peace and Freedom	45	0.4%
Americans Elect	0	0.0%
Other	31	0.3%
No party preference	2,319	18.9%

==== Cities by population and voter registration ====
Cities by population and voter registration
City	Population	Registered voters	Democratic	Republican	D–R spread	Other	No party preference
Orland	7,214	40.6%	33.5%	40.3%	-6.8%	8.2%	21.3%
Willows	6,190	40.4%	32.0%	41.4%	-9.4%	10.6%	20.4%

=== Overview ===
Glenn is a strongly Republican county in Presidential and congressional elections. The last Democrat to win a majority in the county was Lyndon Johnson in 1964.

United States presidential election results for Glenn County, California
Year	Republican		Democratic		Third party(ies)	
Year	No.	%	No.	%	No.	%
1892	528	33.78%	808	51.70%	227	14.52%
1896	479	36.54%	825	62.93%	7	0.53%
1900	494	39.49%	737	58.91%	20	1.60%
1904	765	50.03%	725	47.42%	39	2.55%
1908	618	44.72%	711	51.45%	53	3.84%
1912	11	0.45%	1,325	54.41%	1,099	45.13%
1916	1,342	40.23%	1,797	53.87%	197	5.91%
1920	1,916	64.19%	902	30.22%	167	5.59%
1924	1,444	44.84%	367	11.40%	1,409	43.76%
1928	2,466	65.03%	1,297	34.20%	29	0.76%
1932	1,432	31.34%	2,973	65.07%	164	3.59%
1936	1,620	32.50%	3,288	65.97%	76	1.52%
1940	2,473	43.92%	3,095	54.96%	63	1.12%
1944	2,409	49.32%	2,452	50.20%	23	0.47%
1948	2,819	50.99%	2,578	46.64%	131	2.37%
1952	4,454	64.45%	2,422	35.05%	35	0.51%
1956	3,463	51.96%	3,192	47.89%	10	0.15%
1960	3,911	53.17%	3,410	46.36%	35	0.48%
1964	3,351	45.97%	3,937	54.01%	2	0.03%
1968	3,848	53.91%	2,466	34.55%	824	11.54%
1972	4,569	59.01%	2,681	34.62%	493	6.37%
1976	4,094	52.67%	3,501	45.04%	178	2.29%
1980	5,386	64.80%	2,227	26.79%	699	8.41%
1984	6,020	69.74%	2,488	28.82%	124	1.44%
1988	4,944	62.06%	2,894	36.33%	128	1.61%
1992	3,812	43.24%	2,666	30.24%	2,338	26.52%
1996	5,041	56.86%	2,841	32.04%	984	11.10%
2000	5,795	66.53%	2,498	28.68%	418	4.80%
2004	6,308	66.72%	2,995	31.68%	151	1.60%
2008	5,910	59.82%	3,734	37.80%	235	2.38%
2012	5,632	61.14%	3,301	35.84%	278	3.02%
2016	5,788	61.12%	3,065	32.37%	617	6.52%
2020	7,063	62.52%	3,995	35.36%	239	2.12%
2024	6,904	66.12%	3,260	31.22%	278	2.66%

Glenn County is in California's 1st congressional district, represented by James Gallagher (R–Yuba City). In the State Assembly, Glenn County is in the 3rd Assembly district, represented by Vacant. In the State Senate, the county is in the 1st senatorial district, represented by Republican Megan Dahle.

== Crime ==
The following table includes the number of incidents reported and the rate per 1,000 persons for each type of offense.

Population and crime rates
Population	28,027	
Violent crime	54	1.93
Homicide	0	0.00
Forcible rape	2	0.07
Robbery	10	0.36
Aggravated assault	42	1.50
Property crime	313	11.17
Burglary	177	6.32
Larceny-theft	340	12.13
Motor vehicle theft	49	1.75
Arson	0	0.00

=== Cities by population and crime rates ===
Cities by population and crime rates
City	Population	Violent crimes	Violent crime rate per 1,000 persons	Property crimes	Property crime rate per 1,000 persons
Orland	7,361	27	3.67	210	28.53
Willows	6,223	26	4.18	234	37.60

== Transportation ==
=== Major highways ===
- Interstate 5
- State Route 32
- State Route 45
- State Route 162

=== Public transportation ===
Glenn Ride runs buses from Willows to Hamilton City, and on into Chico (Butte County). The nearest Amtrak station is in Chico.

=== Airports ===
Willows-Glenn County Airport and Haigh Field are both general aviation airports.

=== Railroads ===
California Northern Railroad shortline serves Willows. The main line runs north to Tehama and south to Davis, where the railroad interchanges with the Union Pacific Railroad. Prior to the line being leased to the California Northern, the route was operated by Southern Pacific and was known as the West Side Line. The railroad first reached Willows on December 28, 1879, from Davis. In 1882 the extension from Willows to Tehama was completed. In 1884 the West Side and Mendocino Railroad constructed a line east from Willows to Fruto.

== Communities ==
=== Cities ===
- Orland
- Willows (county seat)

=== Census-designated places ===
- Artois
- Elk Creek
- Hamilton City

=== Other communities ===
- Butte City
- Chrome
- Fruto
- Meadowood Estates, a former unincorporated community

=== Population ranking ===
The population ranking of the following table is based on the 2010 census of Glenn County.

† county seat

Rank	City/Town/etc.	Municipal type	Population (2010 Census)
1	Orland	City	7,291
2	† Willows	City	6,166
3	Hamilton City	CDP	1,759
4	Artois	CDP	295
5	Grindstone Rancheria	AIAN	164
6	Elk Creek	CDP	163

== Education ==
K-12 school districts include:

- Hamilton Unified School District (some areas PK-12, some areas grades 9-12 only)
- Orland Joint Unified School District (some areas PK-12, some areas grades 9-12 only)
- Princeton Joint Unified School District
- Stony Creek Joint Unified School District
- Willows Unified School District

Elementary school districts include:

- Capay Joint Union Elementary School District
- Lake Elementary School District
- Plaza Elementary School District

== See also ==
- National Register of Historic Places listings in Glenn County, California
- Orland Buttes
- Thomas D. Harp, mentions formation of the county
