= Orland, California =

City in California, United States

- City
- City of Orland
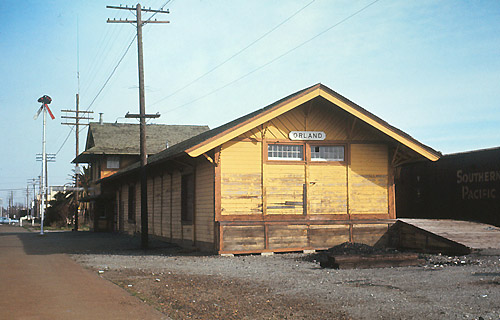
- Orland train station in 1969; now located at the Glenn County Fairgrounds.
- Interactive map of Orland, California
- Location within California Location within the United States
- Coordinates: 39°44′51″N 122°11′47″W
- Country: United States
- State: California
- County: Glenn
- Incorporated: November 11, 1909

Area
  - Total: 2.99 sq mi (7.74 km^{2})
  - Land: 2.99 sq mi (7.74 km^{2})
  - Water: 0 sq mi (0.00 km^{2}) 0%
- Elevation: 259 ft (79 m)

Population (2020)
  - Total: 8,298
  - Density: 2,780/sq mi (1,070/km^{2})
- Time zone: UTC−8 (Pacific (PST))
  - Summer (DST): UTC−7 (PDT)
- ZIP Code: 95963
- Area codes: 530,837
- FIPS code: 06-54274
- GNIS feature IDs: 1659315, 2411335
- Website: Orland, California

Orland is a city in Glenn County, California, United States. The population was 8,298 at the 2020 census, up from 7,291 at the 2010 census, making Orland the most populous city in Glenn County. Orland is located 16 miles (26 km) north of Willows, at an elevation of 259 feet (79 m). Interstate 5, (north–south) passes west of the downtown area while State Route 32 (east–west) passes through downtown.

A member of Bee City USA, Orland is the "Queen Bee Capital of North America" owing to its robust local and regional queen bee production as part of the county's agricultural products. It is home of the Honeybee Discovery Center museum. Annual events include the Queen Bee Festival in June and OktoBEEfest in October.

== History ==
Orland incorporated in 1909. The first post office in Orland opened in 1916.

In 1908 Orland was the namesake of one of the first irrigation projects of the newly formed United States Bureau of Reclamation, the Orland Project, authorized by the Newlands Reclamation Act. The 1910 East Park Dam and other area dams still provide agricultural irrigation water.

During World War II, Orland was selected by the United States Army as the location for an airfield that was used for training pilots. Aircraft used at Orland included the Boeing B-17 Flying Fortress. Scenes for several films used for training pilots and aircrew members were produced at Orland. Constructed of a large square of thick, reinforced concrete, most of the airfield is now a civil airport operated by Glenn County.

Orland station was a stop along the Southern Pacific railroad's West Valley Line, now known as the California Northern Railroad. The Amtrak Coast Starlight route, running daily from Los Angeles to Seattle, served the town from 1974 to 1982.

In 2017 the City Council affiliated the city with Bee City USA and declared itself "Queen Bee Capital of North America" due to the unmatched production of queen bees by locally owned commercial apiaries.

== Geography ==
According to the United States Census Bureau, the city has a total area of 3.0 square miles (7.8 km^{2}), all land.

Orland is a rural agricultural town that sits in the northern Sacramento Valley. Interstate 5 passes just west of the town.

The Sacramento River runs 10 miles (16 km) east of Orland and Black Butte Lake sits 8 miles (13 km) West. The Black Butte Lake dam drains into Stony Creek, which flows about a half-mile north of the Orland Arch.

=== Climate ===
According to the Köppen Climate Classification system, Orland has a hot-summer Mediterranean climate, abbreviated "Csa" on climate maps.

Climate data for Orland, California, 1991–2020 normals, extremes 1903–present
| Month | Jan | Feb | Mar | Apr | May | Jun | Jul | Aug | Sep | Oct | Nov | Dec | Year |
|---|---|---|---|---|---|---|---|---|---|---|---|---|---|
| Record high °F (°C) | 81 (27) | 84 (29) | 89 (32) | 98 (37) | 110 (43) | 115 (46) | 120 (49) | 120 (49) | 114 (46) | 105 (41) | 95 (35) | 81 (27) | 120 (49) |
| Mean maximum °F (°C) | 69.7 (20.9) | 74.6 (23.7) | 81.0 (27.2) | 89.2 (31.8) | 96.4 (35.8) | 104.5 (40.3) | 106.6 (41.4) | 104.6 (40.3) | 103.2 (39.6) | 94.1 (34.5) | 79.8 (26.6) | 68.2 (20.1) | 108.7 (42.6) |
| Mean daily maximum °F (°C) | 56.8 (13.8) | 61.8 (16.6) | 66.9 (19.4) | 73.1 (22.8) | 81.1 (27.3) | 88.8 (31.6) | 94.1 (34.5) | 93.1 (33.9) | 90.0 (32.2) | 79.5 (26.4) | 65.3 (18.5) | 56.5 (13.6) | 75.6 (24.2) |
| Daily mean °F (°C) | 47.3 (8.5) | 50.9 (10.5) | 55.0 (12.8) | 59.9 (15.5) | 67.2 (19.6) | 74.5 (23.6) | 78.8 (26.0) | 77.1 (25.1) | 73.9 (23.3) | 65.1 (18.4) | 53.9 (12.2) | 46.9 (8.3) | 62.5 (17.0) |
| Mean daily minimum °F (°C) | 37.7 (3.2) | 40.1 (4.5) | 43.0 (6.1) | 46.6 (8.1) | 53.3 (11.8) | 60.2 (15.7) | 63.4 (17.4) | 61.0 (16.1) | 57.7 (14.3) | 50.7 (10.4) | 42.5 (5.8) | 37.3 (2.9) | 49.5 (9.7) |
| Mean minimum °F (°C) | 28.8 (−1.8) | 31.4 (−0.3) | 34.4 (1.3) | 36.4 (2.4) | 43.3 (6.3) | 50.4 (10.2) | 55.8 (13.2) | 54.1 (12.3) | 50.1 (10.1) | 42.2 (5.7) | 32.8 (0.4) | 28.0 (−2.2) | 25.8 (−3.4) |
| Record low °F (°C) | 17 (−8) | 19 (−7) | 24 (−4) | 27 (−3) | 31 (−1) | 41 (5) | 45 (7) | 43 (6) | 39 (4) | 29 (−2) | 21 (−6) | 15 (−9) | 15 (−9) |
| Average precipitation inches (mm) | 4.50 (114) | 4.11 (104) | 2.79 (71) | 1.37 (35) | 1.13 (29) | 0.38 (9.7) | 0.02 (0.51) | 0.08 (2.0) | 0.24 (6.1) | 0.91 (23) | 2.04 (52) | 3.82 (97) | 21.39 (543.31) |
| Average precipitation days (≥ 0.01 in) | 11.6 | 9.5 | 8.7 | 5.7 | 4.2 | 1.4 | 0.2 | 0.4 | 0.9 | 3.5 | 6.7 | 10.5 | 63.3 |
Source 1: NOAA
Source 2: National Weather Service

== Demographics ==
Historical population
| Census | Pop. | Note | %± |
|---|---|---|---|
| 1880 | 292 | | — |
| 1890 | 440 | | 50.7% |
| 1910 | 836 | | — |
| 1920 | 1,582 | | 89.2% |
| 1930 | 1,195 | | −24.5% |
| 1940 | 1,366 | | 14.3% |
| 1950 | 2,067 | | 51.3% |
| 1960 | 2,534 | | 22.6% |
| 1970 | 2,884 | | 13.8% |
| 1980 | 4,031 | | 39.8% |
| 1990 | 5,052 | | 25.3% |
| 2000 | 6,281 | | 24.3% |
| 2010 | 7,291 | | 16.1% |
| 2020 | 8,298 | | 13.8% |
| 2025 (est.) | 8,704 | ▲ | 4.9% |
U.S. Decennial Census

=== 2020 census ===
As of the 2020 census, Orland had a population of 8,298. The population density was 2,776.2 inhabitants per square mile (1,071.9/km^{2}). The median age was 34.4 years. 27.8% of residents were under the age of 18 and 15.0% were 65 years of age or older. For every 100 females, there were 93.8 males, and for every 100 females age 18 and over, there were 88.5 males.

The age distribution was 9.5% aged 18 to 24, 25.6% aged 25 to 44, and 22.1% aged 45 to 64. The census also reported that 96.6% of residents lived in urban areas, while 3.4% lived in rural areas.

The census reported that 99.3% of the population lived in households, 0.1% lived in non-institutionalized group quarters, and 0.6% were institutionalized. There were 2,812 households, of which 43.4% had children under the age of 18 living in them. Of all households, 47.9% were married-couple households, 9.7% were cohabiting couple households, 14.9% were households with a male householder and no spouse or partner present, and 27.5% were households with a female householder and no spouse or partner present. About 21.9% of all households were made up of individuals and 11.1% had someone living alone who was 65 years of age or older. The average household size was 2.93, and there were 2,010 families (71.5% of all households).

There were 2,930 housing units, of which 4.0% were vacant. The homeowner vacancy rate was 1.1% and the rental vacancy rate was 2.7%. Of occupied units, 60.0% were owner-occupied and 40.0% were occupied by renters.

Racial composition as of the 2020 census
| Race | Number | Percent |
|---|---|---|
| White | 3,863 | 46.6% |
| Black or African American | 49 | 0.6% |
| American Indian and Alaska Native | 262 | 3.2% |
| Asian | 176 | 2.1% |
| Native Hawaiian and Other Pacific Islander | 11 | 0.1% |
| Some other race | 2,686 | 32.4% |
| Two or more races | 1,251 | 15.1% |
| Hispanic or Latino (of any race) | 4,443 | 53.5% |

=== Demographic estimates ===
In 2023, the US Census Bureau estimated that 19.3% of the population were foreign-born. Of all people aged 5 or older, 52.6% spoke only English at home, 45.9% spoke Spanish, 0.5% spoke other Indo-European languages, and 0.9% spoke Asian or Pacific Islander languages. Of those aged 25 or older, 75.8% were high school graduates and 12.8% had a bachelor's degree.

=== Income and poverty ===
The median household income in 2023 was $64,531, and the per capita income was $26,078. About 14.6% of families and 14.5% of the population were below the poverty line.

=== 2010 census ===
At the 2010 census Orland had a population of 7,291. The population density was 2,453.8 inhabitants per square mile (947.4/km^{2}). The racial makeup of Orland was 4,828 (66.2%) White, 37 (0.5%) African American, 122 (1.7%) Native American, 208 (2.9%) Asian, 1 (0.0%) Pacific Islander, 1,833 (25.1%) from other races, and 262 (3.6%) from two or more races. Hispanic or Latino of any race were 3,269 persons (44.8%).

The census reported that 7,280 people (99.8% of the population) lived in households, 6 (0.1%) lived in non-institutionalized group quarters, and 5 (0.1%) were institutionalized.

There were 2,515 households, 1,074 (42.7%) had children under the age of 18 living in them, 1,280 (50.9%) were opposite-sex married couples living together, 377 (15.0%) had a female householder with no husband present, 147 (5.8%) had a male householder with no wife present. There were 191 (7.6%) unmarried opposite-sex partnerships, and 7 (0.3%) same-sex married couples or partnerships. 583 households (23.2%) were one person and 272 (10.8%) had someone living alone who was 65 or older. The average household size was 2.89. There were 1,804 families (71.7% of households); the average family size was 3.42.

The age distribution was 2,209 people (30.3%) under the age of 18, 742 people (10.2%) aged 18 to 24, 1,875 people (25.7%) aged 25 to 44, 1,608 people (22.1%) aged 45 to 64, and 857 people (11.8%) who were 65 or older. The median age was 32.0 years. For every 100 females, there were 96.6 males. For every 100 females age 18 and over, there were 92.1 males.

There were 2,659 housing units at an average density of 894.9 units per square mile (345.5 units/km^{2}), of which 2,515 were occupied, 1,459 (58.0%) by the owners and 1,056 (42.0%) by renters. The homeowner vacancy rate was 2.2%; the rental vacancy rate was 3.5%. 4,235 people (58.1% of the population) lived in owner-occupied housing units and 3,045 people (41.8%) lived in rental housing units.

== Politics ==
In the state legislature, Orland is in the 1st senatorial district, represented by Republican Megan Dahle, and in the 3rd Assembly district, represented by Vacant.

Federally, Orland is in California's 1st congressional district, represented by Republican James Gallagher.

== Education ==
Orland is served by the Orland Joint Unified School District for grades PK–12.

Public schools

- Fairview Elementary
- Mill Street Elementary
- C.K. Price Middle School
- Orland High School
- North Valley Continuation High School

Private schools

- North Valley Christian School

== Views ==
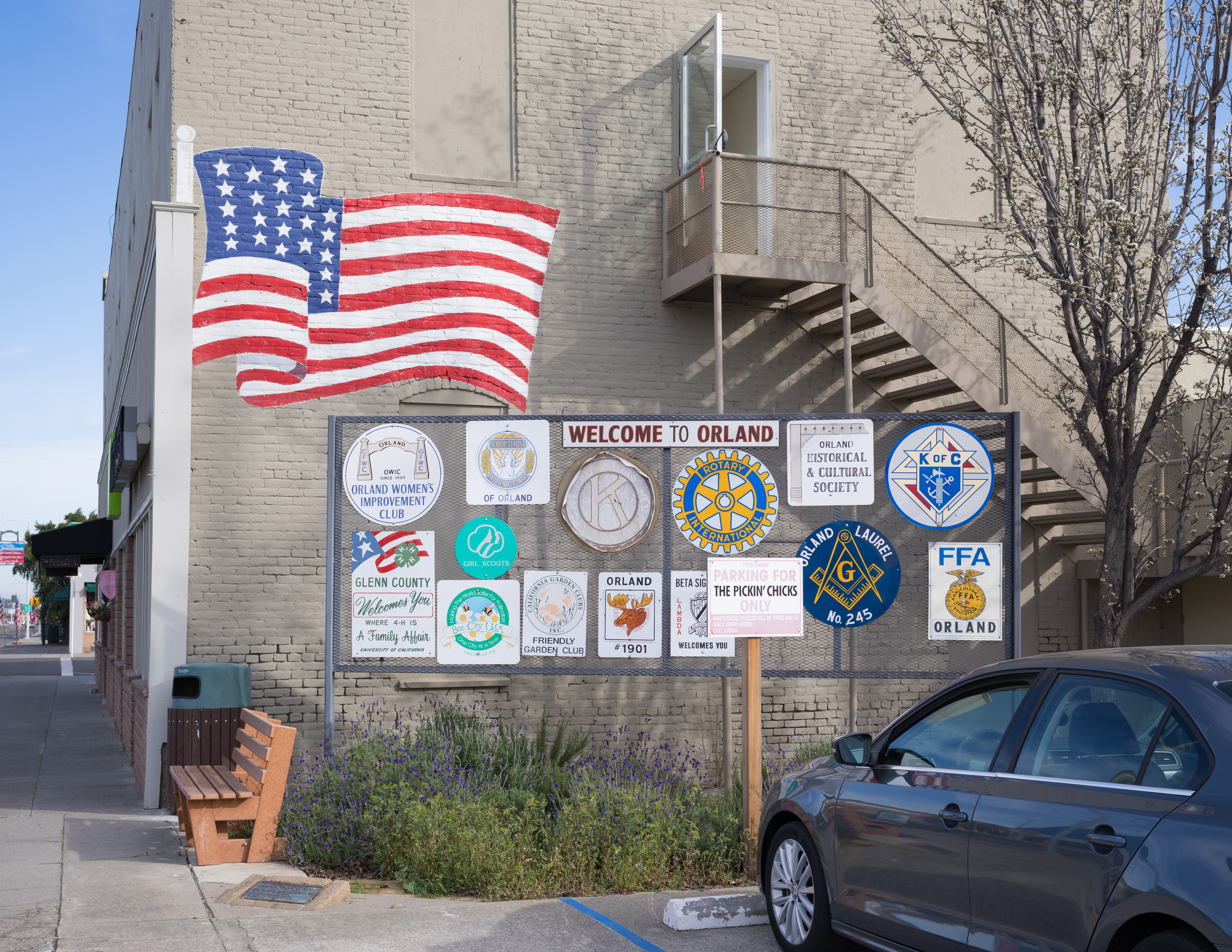
Welcome signs

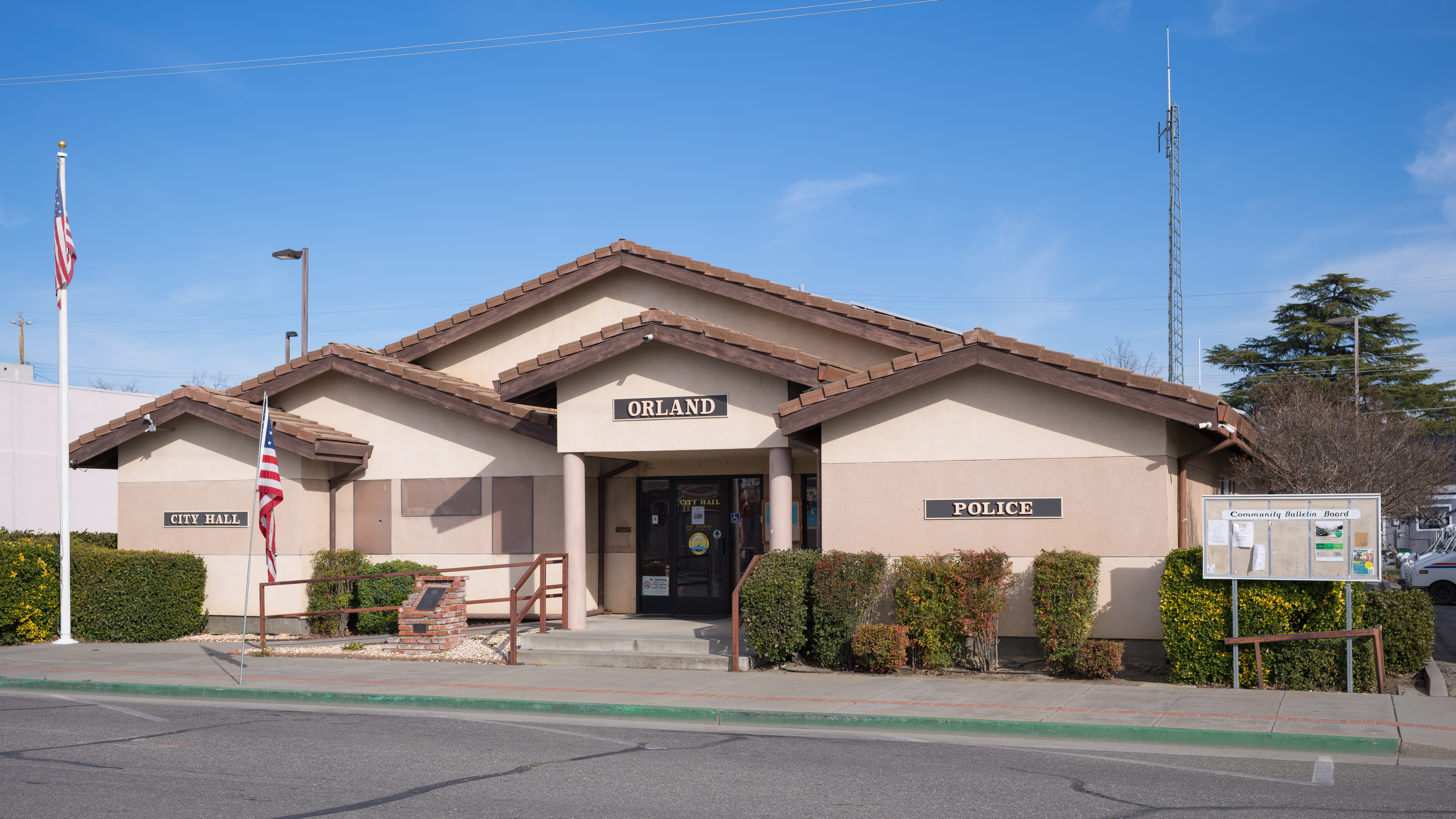
City Hall and Police Station

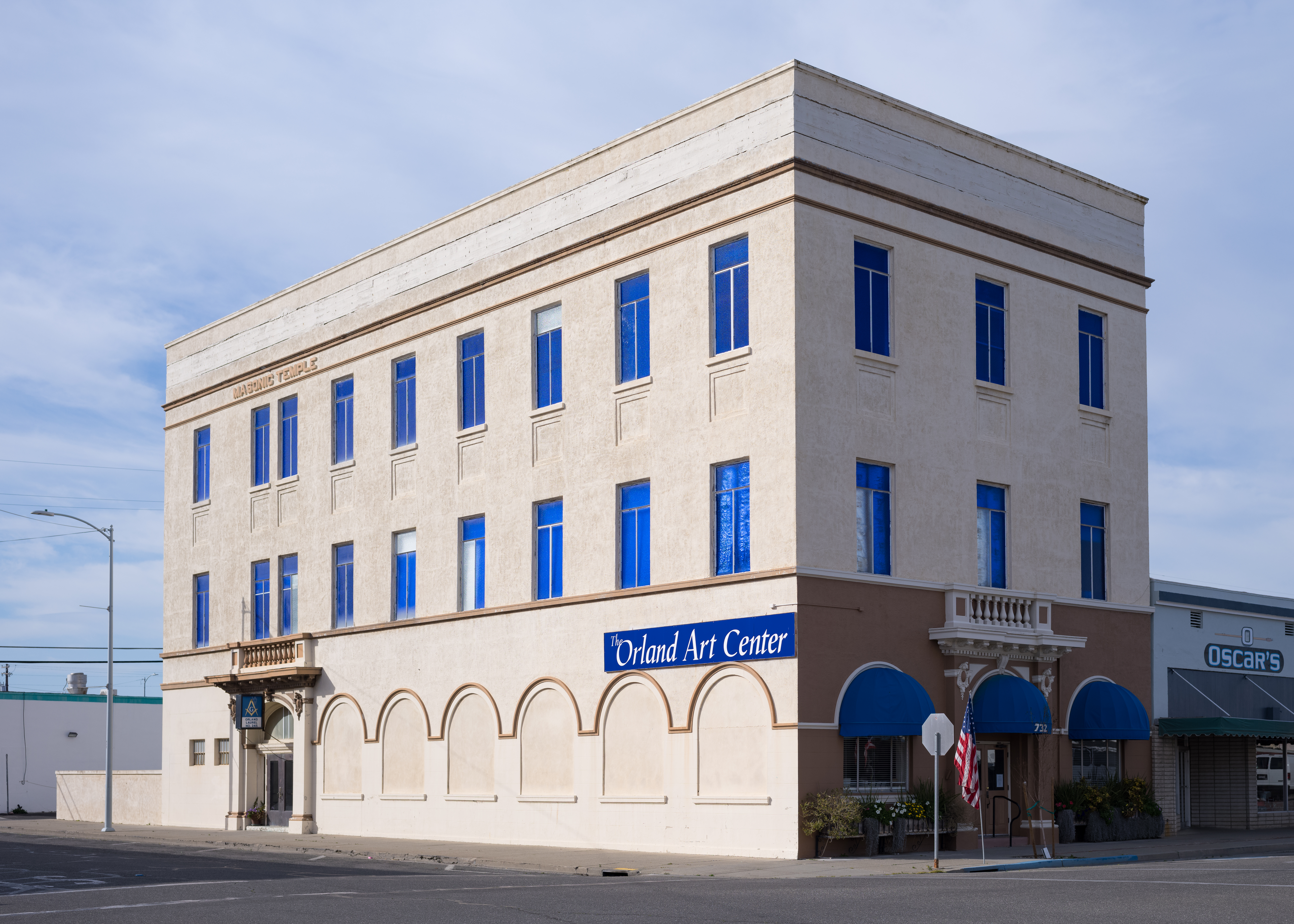
Masonic Temple

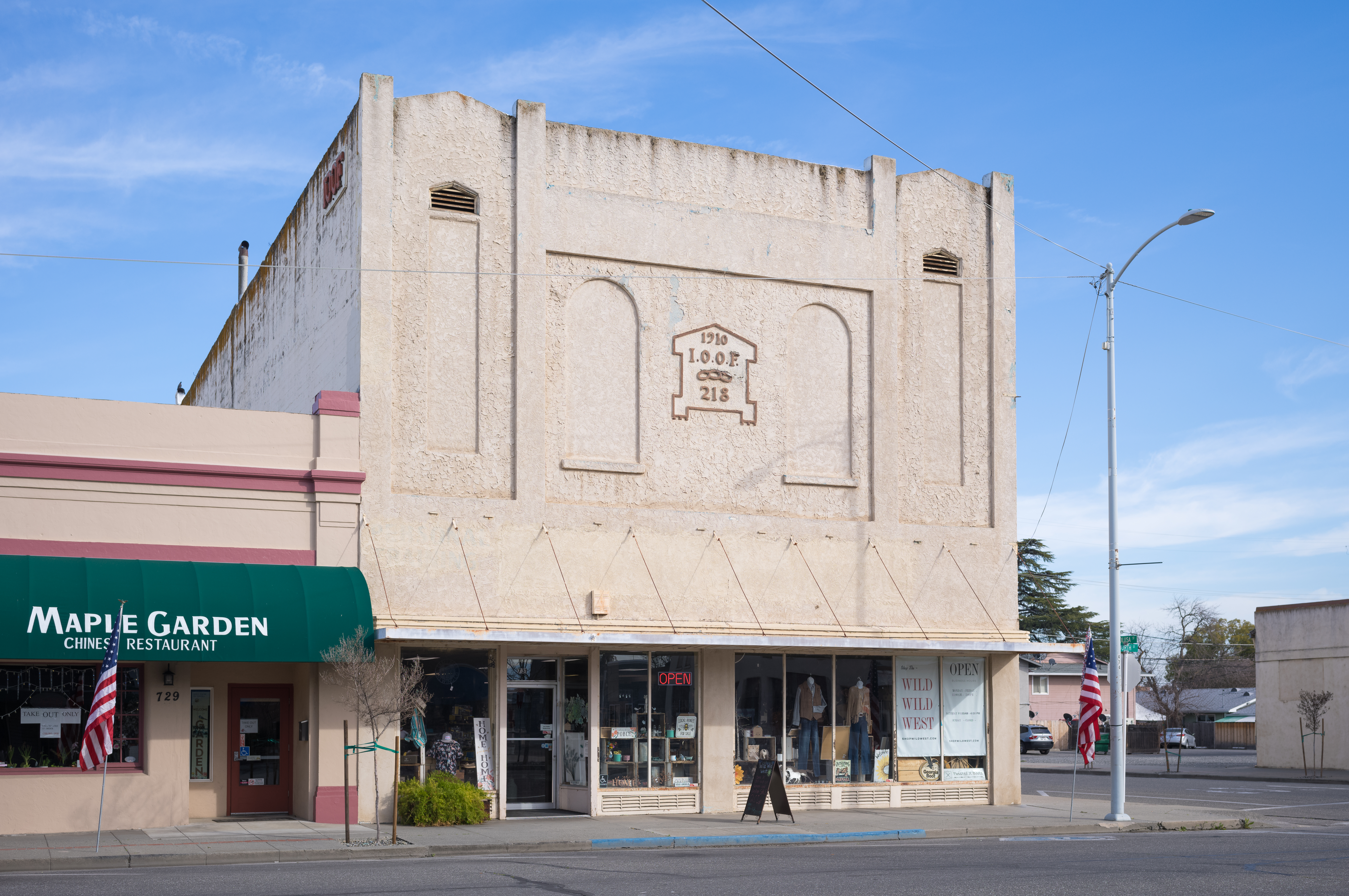
Odd Fellows Building

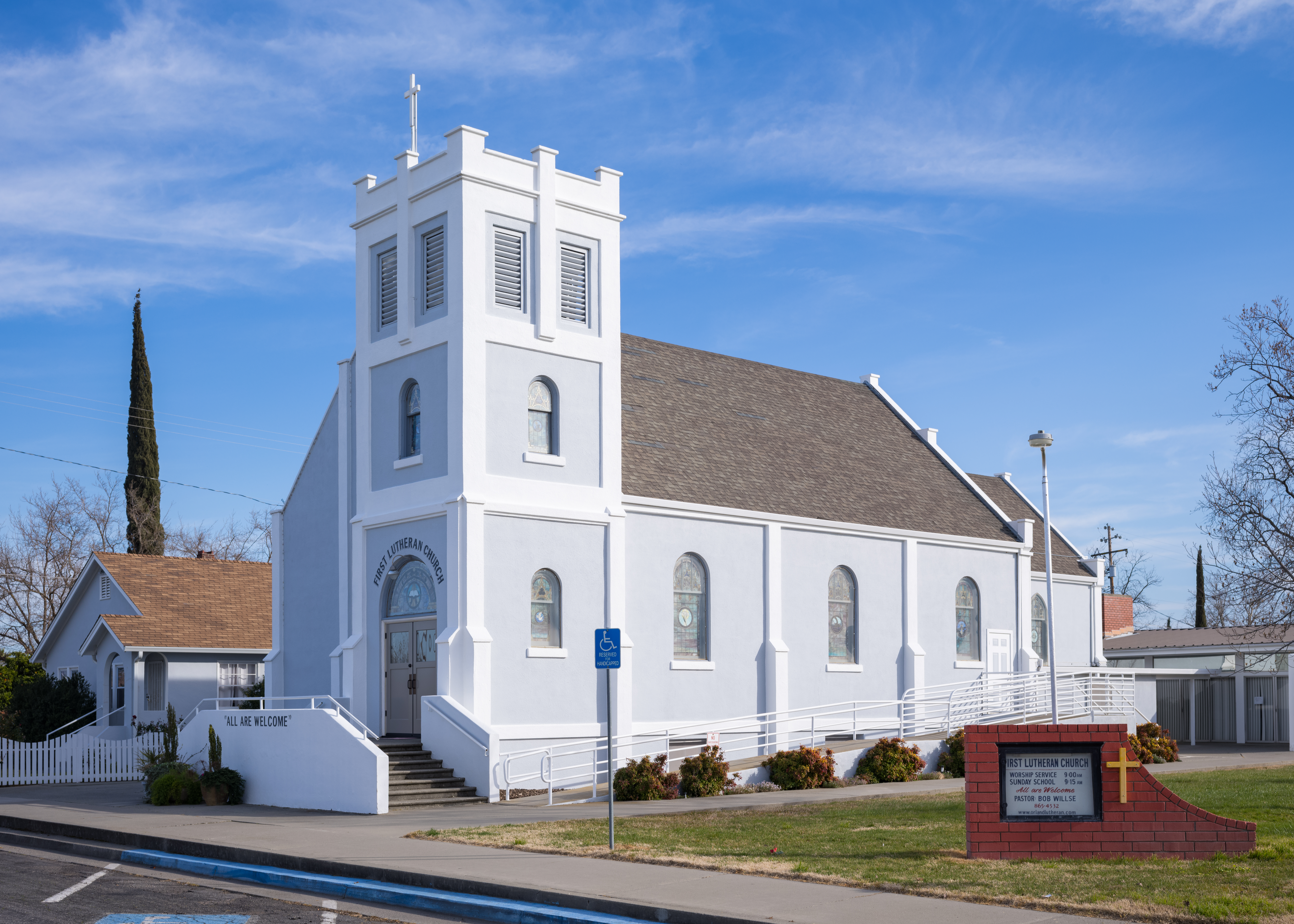
First Lutheran Church

== Notable people ==
- Mark Koenig, infielder and teammate of Babe Ruth and Lou Gehrig with the New York Yankees, was living in Orland at the time of his death in 1993.
- Jackson Pollock, painter, lived on the outskirts of Orland for a short while growing up.
- Aldrick Rosas, NFL placekicker for the New York Giants, was born and raised in Orland.
- Cal Worthington, automobile mogul, owned a 24,000-acre (9,700 ha) ranch here and died in Orland at age 92.
- George Wright, organist, was born in Orland.
