= National Register of Historic Places listings in Colusa County, California =

Location of Colusa County in California

This is a list of the National Register of Historic Places listings in Colusa County, California.

This is intended to be a complete list of the properties and districts on the National Register of Historic Places in Colusa County, California, United States. Latitude and longitude coordinates are provided for many National Register properties and districts; these locations may be seen together in a Google map.

There are 6 properties and districts listed on the National Register in the county.

This National Park Service list is complete through NPS recent listings posted September 4, 2026.

== Current listings ==
	Name on the Register	Image	Date listed	Location	City or town	Description
1	Cecil Ranch		May 14, 2004 (#03000988)	1840 CA 45; 39°05′29″N 121°54′04″W	Grimes	Ranch complex including architect-designed house of 1909.
2	Colusa Carnegie Library	Colusa Carnegie Library	December 10, 1990 (#90001816)	260 Sixth St. 39°12′49″N 122°00′36″W	Colusa	
3	Colusa Grammar School	Colusa Grammar School	June 13, 1978 (#78000657)	425 Webster St. 39°12′32″N 122°00′33″W	Colusa	
4	Colusa High School and Grounds	Colusa High School and Grounds	August 13, 1976 (#76000479)	745 10th St. 39°12′36″N 122°00′59″W	Colusa	
5	Grand Island Shrine	Grand Island Shrine	December 31, 1974 (#74000508)	8 miles (13 km) south of Colusa on CA-45; 39°06′56″N 121°56′15″W	Colusa	
6	Nowi Rancheria		March 24, 1971 (#71000135)	Address Restricted	Grimes	

== See also ==
- List of National Historic Landmarks in California
- National Register of Historic Places listings in California
- California Historical Landmarks in Colusa County, California
