= Colusa =

Colusa or Colusi may refer to:

== People ==
- Colusa Indian Community, a Wintun tribe

== Places ==
- Colusa, California, county seat of Colusa County
- Colusa County, California
- Colusa County Airport, California
- Colusa County Courthouse, California
- Colusa, Illinois
- Colusa National Wildlife Refuge, California
- Colusa Rancheria, California
- Colusa Unified School District, California

== Other ==
- Colusa grass, a common name of Neostapfia colusana, the sole species within the genus Neostapfia
