= List of churches in the Diocese of Sacramento =

This is a list of current and former Roman Catholic churches in the Roman Catholic Diocese of Sacramento. The diocese consists of 12 deaneries covering 20 counties in northwest California and includes the cities of Sacramento, Vallejo, Redding, Fairfield, and Chico

The mother church of the Diocese is the Cathedral of the Blessed Sacrament in Sacramento. The Diocese also includes several parishes dating from the time of the California Gold Rush in the 1850s: St. Canice in Nevada City; Immaculate Conception in Downieville; St. Patrick in Weaverville; St. Dominic in Benicia; and St. Joseph in Marysville.

== City Deanery ==
Name	Image	Location	Established	Sources
Cathedral of the Blessed Sacrament		1017 11th St, Sacramento	1889	
Divine Mercy		2231 Club Center Dr, Sacramento	2005	
Holy Spirit		3159 Land Park Dr, Sacramento	1940	
Our Lady of Guadalupe National Shrine		711 T St, Sacramento	1958	
Sacred Heart		1040 39th St, Sacramento	1926	
St. Anne		7724 24th St, Sacramento	1961	
St. Anthony		660 Florin Rd, Sacramento	1974	
St. Elizabeth of Portugal		1817 12th St, Sacramento	1909	
St. Francis of Assisi		1066 26th St, Sacramento	1894	
St. Joseph		32890 S River Rd, Clarksburg	1893	
St. Mary		1333 58th St, Sacramento	1906	
St. Robert		2243 Irvin Way, Sacramento	1955	

== American River Deanery ==
Name	Image	Location	Established	Sources
Our Lady of the Assumption		5057 Cottage Way, Carmichael	1952	
Our Lady of Lourdes		1951 North Ave, Sacramento	1957	
Presentation of the Blessed Virgin Mary		4123 Robertson Ave, Sacramento	1961	
St. Ignatius Loyola		3235 Arden Way, Sacramento	1954	
St. John the Evangelist		5751 Locust Ave, Carmichael	1960	
St. John Vianney		10497 Coloma Rd, Rancho Cordova	1958	
St. Joseph		1717 El Monte Ave, Sacramento	1924	
St. Lawrence the Martyr		4325 Don Julio Blvd, North Highlands	1955	
St. Mel		4745 Pennsylvania Ave, Fair Oaks	1947	
St. Philomene		2428 Bell St, Sacramento	1948	

== Gold Country Deanery ==
Name	Image	Location	Established	Sources
Holy Trinity		3111 Tierra de Dios Dr, El Dorado Hills	1992	
Immaculate Conception Mission		115 Spanish St, Sutter Creek		
Our Lady of the Pines Mission		26750 Tiger Creek Rd, Pioneer		
Our Lady of the Sierras Mission		18880 US-50, Twin Bridges		
Sacred Heart of Jesus Mission		20 Relihan Dr, Ione		
St. Bernard Mission		16285 Emigrant St, Volcano		
St. James Mission		2831 Harkness Rd, Georgetown		
St. John the Baptist		307 Montrose Dr, Folsom	1857	
St. Katharine Drexel		11361 Prospect Dr, Martell	2011	
St. Mary of the Mountains		18765 Church St, Plymouth		
St. Patrick		3109 Sacramento St, Placerville	1855	
St. Patrick Mission		115 Court St, Jackson		
St. Theresa		1041 Lyons Ave, South Lake Tahoe	1951	

== Mother Lode Deanery ==
Name	Image	Location	Established	Sources
Assumption of the Blessed Virgin Mary		10930 Alder Dr, Truckee	1869	
Corpus Christi		905 W Lake Blvd, Tahoe City	1961	
Immaculate Conception		110 Sunnyside Dr, Downieville	1853	
Our Lady of the Lake Mission		8263 Steelhead Ave, Kings Beach		
Queen of the Snows		1550 Squaw Valley Rd, Squaw Valley		
St. Canice		317 Washington St, Nevada City	1851	
St. Dominic		58 E Oak St, Colfax	1929	
St. Joseph		1162 Lincoln Way, Auburn	1911	
St. Joseph Mission		22200 Foresthill Rd, Foresthill	1861	
St. Patrick		235 Chapel St, Grass Valley	1855	
St. Teresa of Avila		11600 Atwood Rd, Auburn	1994	
St. Thomas Mission		Main St., Sierra City		

== Ridge Deanery ==
Name	Image	Location	Established	Source
Herlong		74 C St, Herlong		
Holy Family		108 Taylor Ave, Portola	1929	
Holy Rosary Mission		614 4th St, Loyalton		
Our Lady of the Snows		220 Clifford Dr, Lake Almanor	1929	
Sacred Heart		507 E. 4th St, Alturas	1883	
Sacred Heart		120 N Union St, Susanville	1912	
St. Anthony Mission		209 Jessie St, Greenville		
St. James Mission		Bonner and Garfield Sts., Cedarville		
St. John		170 Lawrence St, Quincy	1947	

== Shasta Deanery ==
Name	Image	Location	Established	Source
Holy Trinity		60 Hyampom Rd, Hayfork		
Mary, Queen of Peace		30719 Shingletown Ridge Rd, Shingletown		
Our Lady of Mercy		2600 Shasta View Dr, Redding	1980	
Our Lady of the Valley Mission		43434 Hwy 299 E, Fall River Mills		
Sacred Heart		3141 St. Stephen's Dr, Anderson	1949	
Sacred Heart		515 Main St, Red Bluff	1867	
St. Anne Mission		2nd & Main Sts, Cottonwood		
St. Francis of Assisi		37464 Juniper Ave, Burney	1948	
St. Gilbert Mission		Lewiston Rd, Lewiston		
St. Joseph		2040 Walnut Ave, Redding	1903	
St. Michael Mission		3440 Shasta Dam Blvd, Shasta Lake		
St. Patrick		102 Church St, Weaverville	1853	
St. Stephen Mission		200 Hwy 299 E, Bieber		

== Siskiyou Deanery ==
Name	Image	Location	Established	Source
All Saints Mission		1321 Indian Creek Rd, Happy Camp		
Holy Cross		765 First St, Tulelake	1949	
Holy Family		1051 N Davis Ave, Weed	1933-35	
Immaculate Conception Mission		1508 Hawkinsville Humbug Rd, Hawkinsville		
Our Lady of Good Counsel Mission		West Third St, Dorris		
Sacred Heart		11630 Main St, Fort Jones	1921	
St. Anthony		507 Pine St, Mount Shasta	1947	
St. John the Evangelist		5603 Shasta Ave, Dunsmuir	1899	
St. Joseph		213 Colombero Dr, McCloud	1933	
St. Joseph		312 Fourth St, Yreka	1855	
St. Joseph Mission		26200 Sawyer's Bar Rd, Sawyer's Bar		
St. Mary Mission		387 Center St, Etna		

== Solano Deanery ==
Name	Image	Location	Established	Source
Holy Spirit		1050 N Texas St, Fairfield	1877	
Our Lady of Mount Carmel		2700 Dover Ave, Fairfield	1979	
St. Basil		1200 Tuolumne St, Vallejo	1941	
St. Catherine of Siena		3450 Tennessee St, Vallejo	1964	
St. Dominic		475 E I St, Benicia	1854	
St. Joseph		130 S 4th St, Rio Vista	1885	
St. Joseph		1791 Marshall Rd, Vacaville	1992	
St. Mary		350 Stinson Ave, Vacaville	1947	
St. Vincent Ferrer		420 Florida St, Vallejo	1855	

== Southern Suburbs Deanery ==
Name	Image	Location	Established	Source
Good Shepherd		9539 Racquet Court, Elk Grove	1993	
Immaculate Conception		3263 1st Ave, Sacramento	1909	
St. Anthony		14012 Walnut Ave, Walnut Grove	1931	
St. Charles Borromeo		7584 Center Pkwy, Sacramento	1960	
St. Christopher		950 S Lincoln Way, Galt	1920	
St. Jeong-Hae Elizabeth		9354 Kiefer Blvd, Sacramento	1993	
St. Joseph		9961 Elk Grove-Florin Rd, Elk Grove	1962	
St. Maria Goretti		8700 Bradshaw Rd, Elk Grove	2007	
St. Paul		8720 Florin Rd, Sacramento	1958	
St. Peter & All Hallows		5501 14th Ave, Sacramento	2011	
St. Rose		5961 Franklin Blvd, Sacramento	1942	
St. Stephen the First Martyr		5461 44th St, Sacramento	2002	
St. Therese		100 4th St, Isleton	1953	
St. Vincent de Paul		14673 Cantova Way, Rancho Murieta		
Vietnamese Martyrs		8181 Florin Rd, Sacramento	1976	

== Sutter Buttes Deanery ==
Name	Image	Location	Established	Sources
Annunciation Mission		617 8th St, Williams		
Holy Cross Mission		408 Laurel St, Arbuckle		
Immaculate Conception		818 Solano St, Corning	1946	
Our Divine Savior		566 E Lassen Ave, Chico	1967	
Our Lady of Guadalupe Mission		9660 Broadway, Live Oak		
Our Lady of Lourdes		345 Oak St, Colusa	1870	
Grand Island Shrine, a.k.a. Our Lady of Sorrows Shrine		Sycamore Slough Rd, Colusa	1856	
Sacred Heart		1560 Hazel St, Gridley	1926	
Sacred Heart		45 Elm St, Maxwell	1910	
Sacred Heart Station		10316 Old Dobbins Rd, Dobbins		
St. Anthony		10184 La Porte Rd, Challenge		
St. Dominic		830 A St, Orland	1919	
St. Isidore		222 Clark Ave, Yuba City	1952	
St. James Mission		2416 Faber St.		
St. John the Baptist		435 Chestnut St, Chico	1878	
St. Joseph		702 C St, Marysville	1852	
St. Mary Mission		400 Los Robles Ave, Hamilton City		
St. Mary of the Mountain Mission		2nd & Geary Sts, Stonyford		
St. Monica		1129 W Wood St, Willows	1877	
St. Stainslaus Mission		4th & D Sts, Tehama		
St. Thomas the Apostle		1330 Bird St, Oroville	1857	
St. Thomas More		767 Elliott Rd, Paradise	1948	

== West Placer Deanery ==
Name	Image	Location	Established	Source
Divine Savior		9079 Greenback Ln, Orangevale	1987	
Holy Family		7817 Old Auburn Rd, Citrus Heights	1949	
St. Boniface		1045 Marcum Rd, Nicolaus		
St. Clare		1950 Junction Blvd, Roseville	1995	
St. Daniel Mission		214 Main St, Wheatland		
St. Joseph		280 Oak Tree Lane, Lincoln	1892	
St. Joseph Marello		7200 Auburn-Folsom Rd, Granite Bay	2004	
Ss. Peter & Paul		4450 Granite Dr, Rocklin	1981	
St. Rose of Lima		615 Vine Ave, Roseville	1907	

== Yolo Deanery ==
Name	Image	Location	Established	Source
Holy Cross		1321 Anna St, West Sacramento	1913	
Holy Rosary		301 Walnut St, Woodland	1870	
Our Lady of Grace		911 Park Blvd, West Sacramento	1949	
St. Agnes Mission		9865 Main St, Zamora		
St. Anthony		511 Main St, Winters	1913	
St. James		1275 B St, Davis	1912	
St. Martin Mission		25633 Grafton St, Esparto		
St. Paul		222 Sycamore Way, Knights Landing	1949	
St. Peter		105 S 2nd St, Dixon	1877	
