= California Historical Landmarks in Colusa County =

This list includes properties and districts listed on the California Historical Landmark listing in Colusa County, California, United States. Click the "Map of all coordinates" link to the right to view a Google map of all properties and districts with latitude and longitude coordinates in the table below.

Image		Landmark name	Location	City or town	Summary
Colusa County Courthouse	890	Colusa County Courthouse	547 Market St. 39°12′50″N 122°00′31″W	Colusa	
Letts Valley	736	Letts Valley	Letts Lake Campground; 39°18′12″N 122°42′33″W	Letts Lake	Valley and lake settled in 1855 by Jack and David Lett.
Swift's Stone Corral	238	Swift's Stone Corral	Just south of Maxwell-Sites Rd. 39°17′23″N 122°18′11″W	Maxwell	On private property

== See also ==
- List of California Historical Landmarks
- National Register of Historic Places listings in Colusa County, California
