= Doug Mayberry =

American football player (born 1937)

No. 35, 33
- Position: Fullback

Personal information
- Born: March 23, 1937 (age 89); Arbuckle, California, U.S.
- Listed height: 6 ft 1 in (1.85 m)
- Listed weight: 220 lb (100 kg)

Career information
- High school: Colusa (Colusa, California)
- College: California (1955–1956); Utah State (1959–1960)
- NFL draft: 1961: 10th round, 127th overall pick
- AFL draft: 1961: 11th round, 83rd overall pick

Career history
- Minnesota Vikings (1961–1962); Oakland Raiders (1963)

Career NFL/AFL statistics
- Rushing yards: 314
- Rushing average: 3.6
- Receptions: 13
- Receiving yards: 118
- Total touchdowns: 2
- Stats at Pro Football Reference

Douglas Clark Mayberry (born March 23, 1937) is an American former professional football player who was a fullback with the Minnesota Vikings of the National Football League (NFL) and Oakland Raiders of the American Football League (AFL). He played college football for the California Golden Bears and Utah State Aggies.
