= 008 =

008, OO8, O08, or 0O8 may refer to:

- "008", a fictional 00 Agent of MI6
- 008: Operation Exterminate, a 1965 Italian action film
- Explosivo 008, a 1940 Argentine crime film
- Tyrrell 008, a Formula One car
- Balls 8, NASA NB-52B mothership, tail number 52-008
- O08, Colusa County Airport
- The original toll-free area code in Australia
- Cyborg 008, a 00-number cyborg in Cyborg 009
- Dongfeng eπ 008, Chinese electric mid-size crossover SUV
