= Will S. Green =

American politician (1832–1905)

William Semple Green
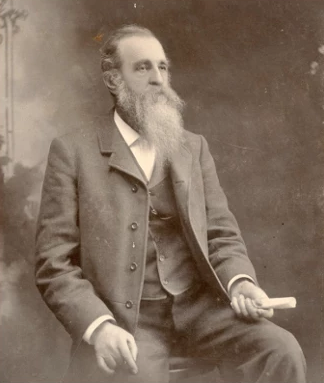
- Will S. Green

California State Treasurer
- In office 1898–1899
- Preceded by: Levi Rackliffe
- Succeeded by: Truman Reeves

Member of the California State Assembly
- Incumbent
- Assumed office 1868

Personal details
- Born: December 26, 1832 Kentucky, U.S.
- Died: July 2, 1905 (aged 72) California, U.S.
- Occupation: Pioneer, steamboat captain, surveyor, newspaper publisher, writer, politician
- Known for: "Father of irrigation" in California

William Semple Green (December 26, 1832, Kentucky – July 2, 1905) was a California pioneer, a steamboat captain, mail carrier, surveyor, newspaper publisher, writer, legislator, United States Surveyor General for California, California State Treasurer, and irrigationist.

== Private life ==
He came to California during the California gold rush, arriving in San Francisco via the Panama Canal at the age of 17 on October 10, 1849, although he never tried his hand at gold mining. His uncle, C.D. Semple, purchased 8,875 acres (35.92 km^{2}) of land from John Bidwell in then-Colusi County (now Colusa County). On July 1, 1850, Green piloted a steamboat up the Sacramento River, taking his uncle and cousin to their land, where they founded the town of Colusa.

Over the next several years, Green held a number of different jobs, such as hotel keeper, joint founder of a bakery, selling fresh vegetables and writing magazine articles. He married his first wife Josephine Davis in 1862, and they had a daughter (Lucy) in 1864. Josephine died in 1881, and Green was remarried ten years later to Sally Morgan whom he had met at an irrigation meeting there a few years before in Salt Lake City.

== Newspaperman ==
On September 26, 1863, he and a partner purchased the Colusa Sun newspaper.

As editor-publisher of the Sun, he concentrated on representing his local area. Largely self-taught (as a youth, he received no formal education beyond the old backwoods field school), he was interested in practical education. His view of editorship was that a newspaperman should teach his community social responsibilities and educate men to live happily together.

He also became known as an advocate of states' rights, although he was clear to distinguish that from slavery. On June 1, 1865 he wrote, "There could be such a thing as a Republic in this country without slavery, but there can never be such a thing as a Republic in America without the acknowledgement of States Rights."

In 1899, Green was the elected first president of The Central and Northern California Press Association. He saw it as an opportunity to discuss problems common to newspaper editors, and to broaden their horizons beyond just their localities. He also saw it as means to resist advertisers who sought articles putting them in favorable light in return for vague promises of future business, in addition to local bodies that demanded free newspaper space for material they were required to publish by law.

For his efforts, Green is enshrined in the California Press Association's California Newspaper Hall of Fame.

== Irrigationist ==
Because of droughts that affected the region in the 1850s, he was a tireless promoter of irrigating the Sacramento Valley. In June 1863, the Sacramento Valley Irrigation Company incorporated with Green as its president. In 1864 he became County Surveyor, and he was President and Superintendent of the Stony Creek Canal Company formed in October 1881.

On December 18, 1883, on an oak tree on the west bank of the Sacramento River, he posted the first water notice, stating that 500,000 miner's inches (350 m³/s) of river water was being diverted for irrigation of lands on the west side of the Sacramento Valley (this location is now registered as California Historical Landmark #831).

In 1888, Green broke ground on the 61-mile (98 km) Central Irrigation District canal and he organized the Sacramento Valley Development Corporation to attract settlers for the soon to be irrigated land.

It is therefore not surprising that Green became known as the "father of irrigation" in California.

== Later years ==
In 1900, Green helped to found the Sacramento Valley Development Association, an organization created to advance the area's political and commercial interests as well as market its agricultural products. He was elected its President soon after its inception and served until his death in 1905. In this capacity, he published pamphlets and monthly journals to educate existing residents and attract new ones, as well as promote potential valley projects. Proposals championed by Green in the Association's early days (despite a dearth of funds at the time) were the Orland Project with its East Park Dam as well as a Geological Survey of possible reservoir sites, the first study of water storage problems in the valley.

== Public servant ==
In addition to the above, Green also served in a number of public posts:

- County Superintendent of Schools (1867)
- President (Mayor) of the Board of Trustees of the City of Colusa (1873–1876)
- Public School Trustee
- California State Assemblyman (1868)
- U.S. Surveyor General for California (1892)
- California State Treasurer (1898)
- Trustee of the California State Library
- Director of the State Board of Trade

== W.S. Green cottage ==
The Green family moved into this cottage on July 10, 1868, across from the Colusa County Courthouse. Green lived there for the remainder of his entire life. The cottage still stands, restored to its 1880 state, although there was a battle to do so. The county had wanted to demolish the home for a parking lot, but the owner refused, instead selling it to Richard E. Patton, a retired judge, who initiated the restoration.

== References and external links ==
- Will S. Green, California Newspaper Association Hall of Fame
- Restoration of the Will S. Green Cottage, Colusi County Historical Society
- William Semple Green Memorial

Political offices
Preceded by Levi Rackliffe	State Treasurer of California; 1898–1899	Succeeded by Truman Reeves
