= Colusa Carnegie Library =

- U.S. National Register of Historic Places
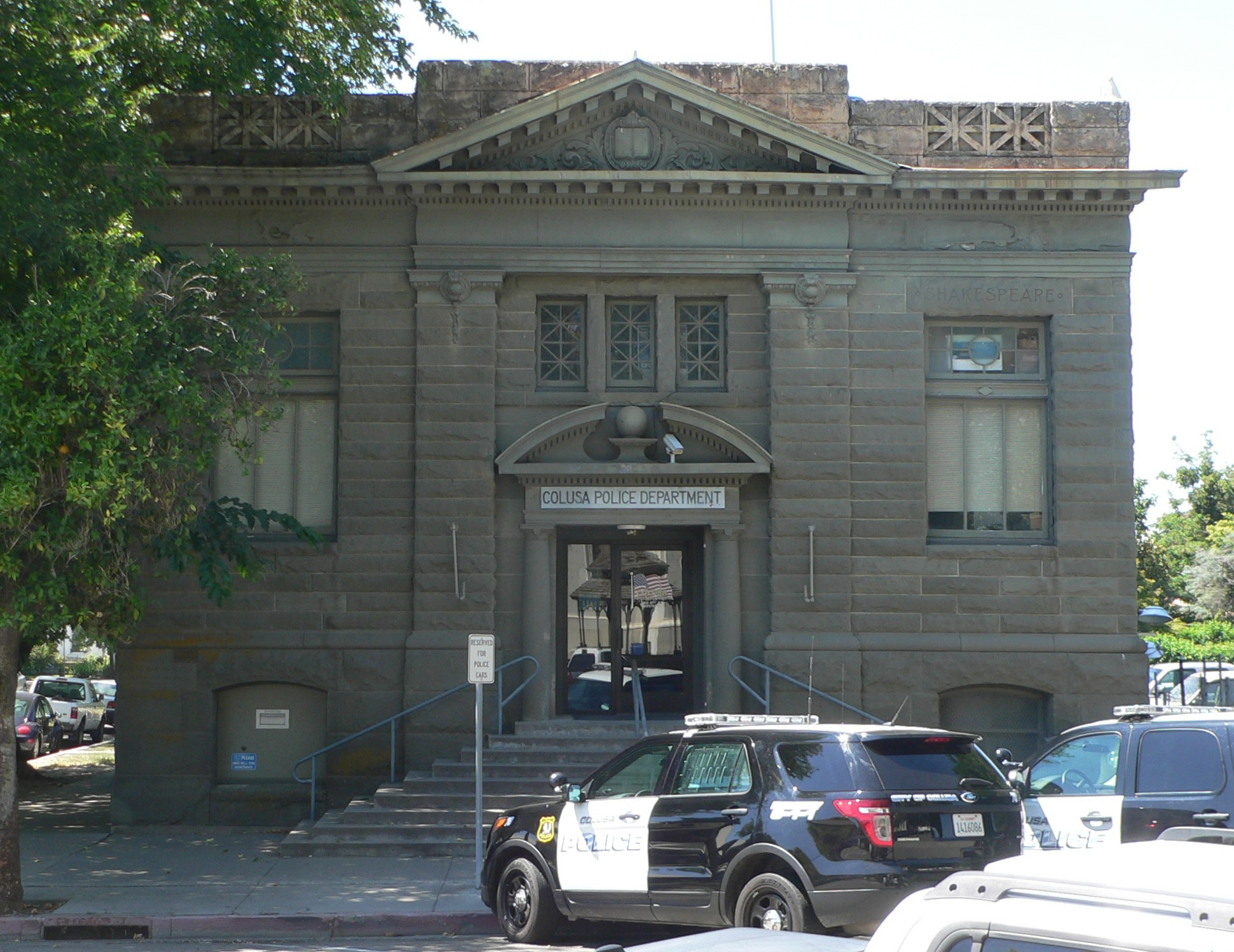
- City of Colusa Police Department, seen from 6th Street

- Location within California Location within the United States
- Location: 260 Sixth St., Colusa, California
- Coordinates: 39°12′49.11″N 122°0′35.63″W
- Area: less than one acre
- Built: 1906
- Built by: Stone, Louis S.; Smith, Henry C.
- Architectural style: Classical Revival
- MPS: California Carnegie Libraries MPS
- NRHP reference No.: 90001816
- Added to NRHP: December 10, 1990

The Colusa Carnegie Library, at 260 Sixth St. in Colusa, California, is a Carnegie library built in 1906 that is listed on the National Register of Historic Places. It has also been known as the Carnegie Library Building and the City of Colusa Police Department.

The library was one of 13 Carnegie libraries built in the Sacramento Valley during 1903–17, and the oldest one surviving in its original appearance. It was built with $10,000 Carnegie funding for a total of $13,158. It served as library from 1906 to 1964, and as police department since 1977. It was designated a Colusa Historic Landmark in 1981, at which time features specifically noted worthy of preservation were its Sites sandstone veneer and parapet, its metal pediment and entablature upon pilasters, its segmental arched windows at the basement level, its main floor rectangular windows with transoms and its carved stone lintels with famous authors' names.

It was listed on the National Register of Historic Places in 1990.

== See also ==
- Carnegie libraries in California
- National Register of Historic Places listings in Colusa County, California
