= Hiram M. Barton =

American businessman and politician

Hiram Merritt Barton

Mayor of San Bernardino
- In office May 8, 1905 – June 24, 1907

Member of the California State Assembly from the 79th district
- In office January 3, 1887 – January 7, 1889
- Preceded by: Truman Reeves
- Succeeded by: Elmer W. Holmes

Personal details
- Born: December 18, 1856 El Monte, California, United States
- Died: December 11, 1928 (aged 71) San Bernardino, California
- Party: Democratic Party
- Spouse(s): Ida Frances Haws (m. 1886); Florence Belle Gibson (m. 1895)
- Children: 3
- Parent: Ben Barton (father)
- Occupation: Businessman, politician

Hiram Merritt Barton (December 18, 1856 – December 11, 1928) was an American businessman and politician.

Born in El Monte, California, his father was Ben Barton, who was a physician, businessman, and politician. Hiram Merritt Barton was responsible for the development of the San Bernardino Valley. Barton served in the California State Assembly for the 79th district from 1887 to 1889 as a Democrat. From 1905 to 1907 Barton served as mayor of San Bernardino, California. Barton died in San Bernardino.

== See also ==
- History of San Bernardino, California
