= State Theatre (Red Bluff, California) =

- U.S. National Register of Historic Places
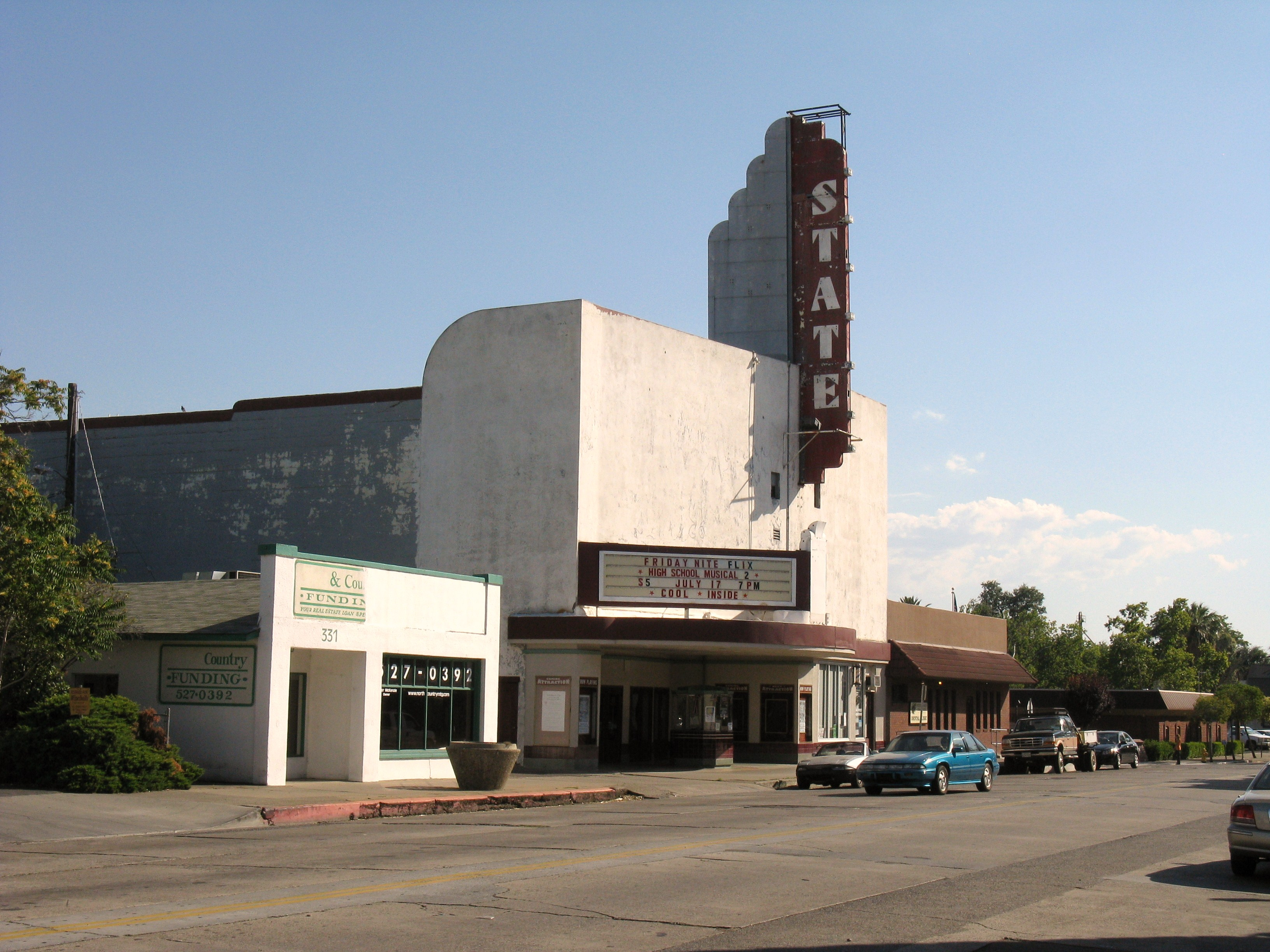

- Location within California Location within the United States
- Location: 333 Oak St., Red Bluff, California
- Coordinates: 40°10′35″N 122°14′3″W
- Area: less than one acre
- Architect: Cantin, Alexander A.; Cantin, Mackenzie A.
- Architectural style: Moderne
- NRHP reference No.: 02000372
- Added to NRHP: April 17, 2002

The State Theatre is a Moderne style cinema in Red Bluff, California, US. It was built in 1945-46 to a design by architects Alexander A. and Mackenzie A. Cantin, replacing a theater that had burned two years before. It provided the only public stage in Tehama County until 1991, and was the only cinema until 1993. It is notable as one of the few theaters to be built in the United States during World War II.

== History ==
The State Theatre was built as a replacement of a building that was first built in 1908 as the Orpheum Theatre, or the Opera House. After a 1928 renovation, the theater was renamed the State Theatre. This building burned in 1944, and a replacement was deemed vital for morale. Construction began in April 1945, but was delayed by wartime materials shortages. The new theater opened on May 24, 1946, complete with air conditioning. The front of the theater was not completed as designed, with a more elaborate marquee and facade deferred and finally cancelled.

In 1980 the house was divided for two screens, then subdivided again in 1992. It closed in 1993, superseded by a newer multiplex cinema. It was purchased in 1998 for redevelopment as a community arts center. It was renovated and reopened as the State Theatre for the Arts with seating for about 750.

== Description ==
The one story State Theatre occupies a corner lot at Oak Street and Washington Street, with the theater entrance and a tenant space fronting on Oak Street. The theater is built of cast-in-place concrete with a two-story plain concrete facade. Original plans called for a large faceted pylon sign and a larger marquee, which were never built. A freestanding box office stands in a recessed exterior lobby area, surrounded by a terrazzo floor. Four pairs of doors give access to the inner lobby. The inner lobby has been substantially altered. The auditorium was originally designed for more the 900 patrons in three areas. The orchestra seats in front of the stage are separated from a loge by half-walls, while a balcony-like area is actually a sloped stadium-style seating area at the rear. The house features elaborate murals of nymphs and horses that are its most distinctive feature. There are basements under the stage and lobby.

The State Theatre was listed on the National Register of Historic Places on April 17, 2002.

== See also ==
- National Register of Historic Places listings in Tehama County, California
