= Grimes, California =

Grimes
- Census-designated place
- Location in California
- Coordinates: 39°04′28″N 121°53′38″W
- Country: United States
- State: California
- County: Colusa
- Post office: 1883
- Named after: Cleaton Grimes

Area
  - Total: 2.261 sq mi (5.856 km^{2})
  - Land: 2.261 sq mi (5.856 km^{2})
  - Water: 0 sq mi (0 km^{2}) 0%
- Elevation: 46 ft (14 m)

Population (2020)
  - Total: 296
  - Density: 131/sq mi (50.5/km^{2})
- Time zone: UTC-8 (Pacific (PST))
  - Summer (DST): UTC-7 (PDT)
- ZIP code: 95950
- Area code: 530, 837
- FIPS code: 06-31288
- GNIS feature IDs: 224619, 2583030

Grimes (formerly Grimes Landing) is a census-designated place in Colusa County, California, United States, on the Southern Pacific Railroad. It lies at an elevation of 46 feet (14 m). The two main roads that run through it are State Route 45 and Grimes-Arbuckle Road. Its ZIP code is 95950, and its area code is 530. Grimes's population was 296 at the 2020 U.S. census.

== History ==
The post office was established in 1883. Grimes is named after Cleaton Grimes, who obtained the townsite land in 1844.

The Cecil Ranch in Grimes is listed on the National Register of Historic Places, partly for the architecture of its architect-designed main house, built in 1909.

== Features ==
Grimes is located near the Sacramento River, on Highway 45 between Colusa and Knight's Landing. There is a convenience store, a small post office, a public library, and an elementary school. The school features grades kindergarten through fifth grade; however, some years the school will accept sixth graders due to its small student count. There is a boat landing on the river to the south of the town, which also serves as a restaurant for the community.

== Demographics ==
Historical population
Census	Pop.	Note	%±
2010	391		—
2020	296		−24.3%
U.S. Decennial Census; 2010

Grimes first appeared as a census designated place in the 2010 U.S. census.

The 2020 United States census reported that Grimes had a population of 296. The population density was 130.9 inhabitants per square mile (50.5/km^{2}). The racial makeup of Grimes was 110 (37.2%) White, 1 (0.3%) African American, 5 (1.7%) Native American, 1 (0.3%) Asian, 0 (0.0%) Pacific Islander, 128 (43.2%) from other races, and 51 (17.2%) from two or more races. Hispanic or Latino of any race were 196 persons (66.2%).

The whole population lived in households. There were 112 households, out of which 43 (38.4%) had children under the age of 18 living in them, 57 (50.9%) were married-couple households, 6 (5.4%) were cohabiting couple households, 23 (20.5%) had a female householder with no partner present, and 26 (23.2%) had a male householder with no partner present. 37 households (33.0%) were one person, and 21 (18.8%) were one person aged 65 or older. The average household size was 2.64. There were 69 families (61.6% of all households).

The age distribution was 71 people (24.0%) under the age of 18, 37 people (12.5%) aged 18 to 24, 60 people (20.3%) aged 25 to 44, 69 people (23.3%) aged 45 to 64, and 59 people (19.9%) who were 65 years of age or older. The median age was 35.7 years. For every 100 females, there were 94.7 males.

There were 123 housing units at an average density of 54.4 units per square mile (21.0 units/km^{2}), of which 112 (91.1%) were occupied. Of these, 41 (36.6%) were owner-occupied, and 71 (63.4%) were occupied by renters.

== Government ==
In the California State Legislature, Grimes is in the 1st senatorial district, represented by Republican Megan Dahle, and the 4th Assembly district, represented by Democrat Cecilia Aguiar-Curry.

In the United States House of Representatives, Grimes is in California's 1st congressional district, represented by Republican James Gallagher.

== Education ==
Grimes is served by the Pierce Joint Unified School District.
