= Barton Villa =

Historic house in California, United States

- U.S. National Register of Historic Places
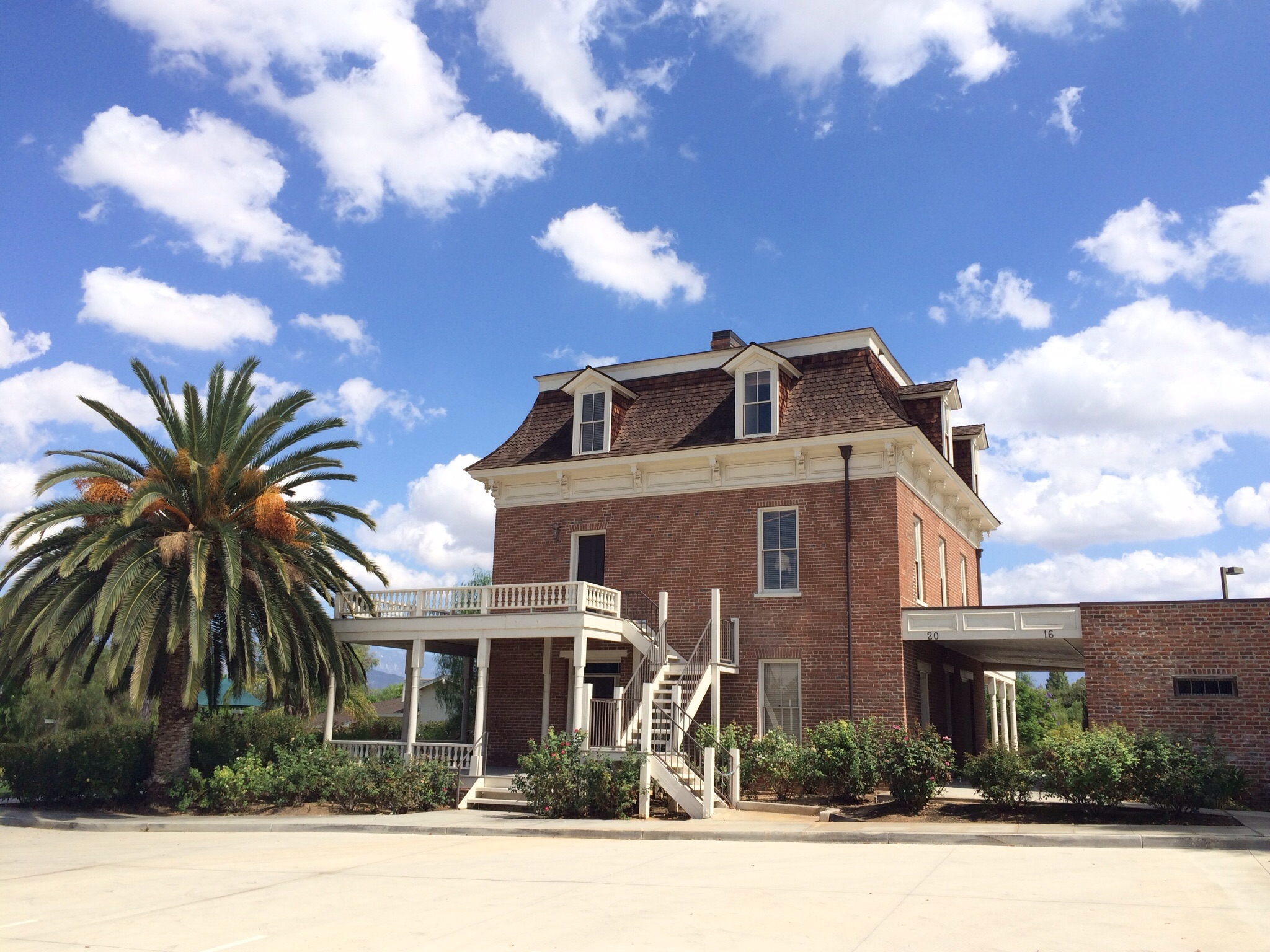

- Location within California Location within the United States
- Location: 11245 Nevada St., Redlands, California
- Coordinates: 34°2′58″N 117°12′58″W
- Area: 2.4 acres (0.97 ha)
- Built: 1866-67; 1871-72; 1893
- Architectural style: Second Empire
- NRHP reference No.: 96001176
- Added to NRHP: October 24, 1996

Barton Villa, at 11245 Nevada St. in Redlands, California, is a historic Second Empire house that is listed on the National Register of Historic Places. It was built as a vernacular house during 1866–67, was renovated to Greek Revival c. 1871–72, and renovated again into Second Empire style in 1893. It was the first fired-brick house built in Redlands (and the second in all of San Bernardino County, California), and is the oldest surviving house in Redlands. When it was NRHP-listed, it was the only Second Empire house in Redlands.

Also known as Barton House and as Barton Ranch, it was listed on the National Register of Historic Places in 1996; the listing included two contributing buildings. It was deemed significant for association with Dr. Ben Barton, early settler (of "Anglos") and large landowner.
