= Truman Reeves =

American politician

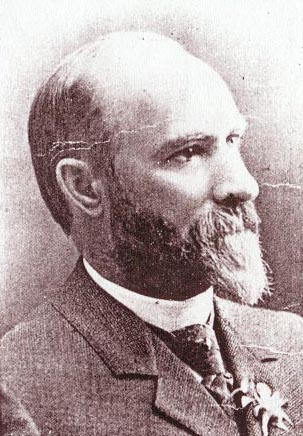
- Reeves in 1897

18th California State Treasurer
- In office January 4, 1899 – January 9, 1907
- Governor: Henry T. Gage; George Pardee
- Preceded by: Will S. Green
- Succeeded by: William R. Williams

Member of the California State Assembly
- In office January 8, 1883 – January 3, 1887
- Preceded by: Elijah W. Hendrick
- Succeeded by: Hiram M. Barton
- Constituency: 1st district (1883–1885); 79th district (1885–1887)

Personal details
- Born: August 17, 1840 Chardon, Ohio, U.S.
- Died: March 8, 1924 (aged 83) Sacramento, California, U.S.
- Party: Republican
- Spouse: Marion E. McConkey (m. 1867)
- Children: 2

Military service
- Branch/service: Union Army
- Rank: Lieutenant
- Battles/wars: American Civil War

Truman Reeves (August 17, 1840 – March 8, 1924) was California State Treasurer from 1899 to 1907. He also was a member of the California State Assembly from 1883 to 1887 and treasurer of San Bernardino County (1890–98). He was a Republican.

== Biography ==
Reeves was born in Chardon, Ohio. He became a watchmaker's apprentice at age 18, and enlisted in the Union Army in 1861. He was promoted from private to lieutenant, and was wounded three times—the last at the Battle of Cold Harbor in 1864, where he lost his left arm. After the war, he was postmaster of Orwell, Ohio until 1868, and was then elected recorder of Ashtabula County, Ohio. In 1867 he married Marion E. McConkey (1845–1930), with whom he raised two children. They moved to San Bernardino, California in 1875, where Reeves worked as a watchmaker and fruit grower. He died in 1924 and his grave is at the East Lawn Memorial Park in Sacramento, California.

Political offices
Preceded by Will S. Green	California State Treasurer; 1899–1907	Succeeded by William R. Williams
