= Levi Rackliffe =

American politician

State Treasurer of California
- In office 1895–1898
- Preceded by: J. R. McDonald
- Succeeded by: Will S. Green

Personal details
- Born: c. 1843 Lincolnville, Maine
- Died: April 21, 1898 Sacramento, California
- Resting place: Sacramento Historic City Cemetery
- Party: California Republican
- Occupation: Politician
- Known for: State Treasurer of California

Levi Rackliffe (c. 1843 – April 21, 1898) served as California State Treasurer from 1895 until his death. He was born in Lincolnville, Maine and died in Sacramento, California, at around age 55. He is interred in the Sacramento Historic City Cemetery.

== Resources ==
- Levi Rackliffe entry at Genealogy.com

Political offices
| Preceded by J. R. McDonald | State Treasurer of California; 1895–1898 | Succeeded by Will S. Green |
