= Ben Barton =

American politician (1823–1899)

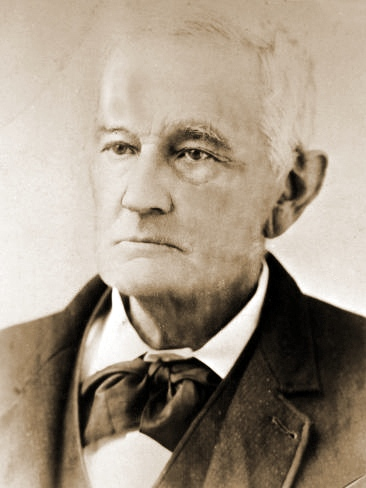

Member of the California State Assembly from the 1st district
- In office January 6, 1862 – December 7, 1863

Personal details
- Born: June 8, 1823 South Carolina
- Died: January 1, 1899 (aged 75)
- Spouse: Eliza Brite
- Children: 5, including Hiram
- Occupation: Doctor, landowner, vintner, politician, settler

Ben Barton (June 8, 1823 – January 1, 1899), often erroneously referred to as Benjamin Barton, was a prominent landowner and white settler of the San Bernardino Valley in southern California. Educated as a medical doctor in the Eastern United States, he migrated to Southern California in 1854. A few years later, he purchased a large tract of land in Rancho San Bernardino. He served various political roles in state and local government. After retiring from his medical practice, he became a rancher and vintner, and had a large mansion built for his family. His sons also became prominent local politicians and businessmen.

After Barton's death, his land holdings were split into lots and sold for development; the area eventually became the city of Redlands. Barton built some of the earliest buildings in Redlands and neighboring San Bernardino, and his villa is now listed as a historic site. Barton was also a philanthropist and social host. He and his family were well-known and influential in the San Bernardino area during its pioneer era.

== Early life and family ==
Barton was born in South Carolina in 1823 to a family descended from European colonists of the area. He studied medicine in Lexington, Kentucky, which he moved to in 1845. He lived and worked as a doctor in Texas and Alabama after his time in Kentucky. He met and married his wife, Eliza Brite, in Texas, and they resided in El Paso until 1854. In that year, he moved west with his wife to El Monte, California. The Bartons had two sons during this time, John H. Barton (b. 1855) and Hiram Barton (b. 1856).

== Career ==
In the late 1850s, Barton was able to purchase large amounts of land from members of the Church of Jesus Christ of Latter-day Saints in Rancho San Bernardino at low prices due to Brigham Young's recalling the Mormon outpost in San Bernardino. From Charles C. Rich and Amasa Lyman, leaders of the Mormon settlement in the area, he purchased, for $5,000 (approximately $186,100 today), 640 acres (2.6 km^{2}) of property around the San Bernardino Asistencia, land known as Old San Bernardino due to its status as a late 17th-/early 18th-century outpost of Mission San Gabriel Arcángel. His purchases also included a number of properties within San Bernardino proper. Barton was appointed the city's postmaster, and built a building in 1858 in San Bernardino out of adobe to house a post office, doctor's office, and pharmacy. Due to Barton's other commitments, the post office was effectively overseen by John P. Barton, his brother. Also in 1858, Barton was elected school superintendent for the recently formed county of San Bernardino.

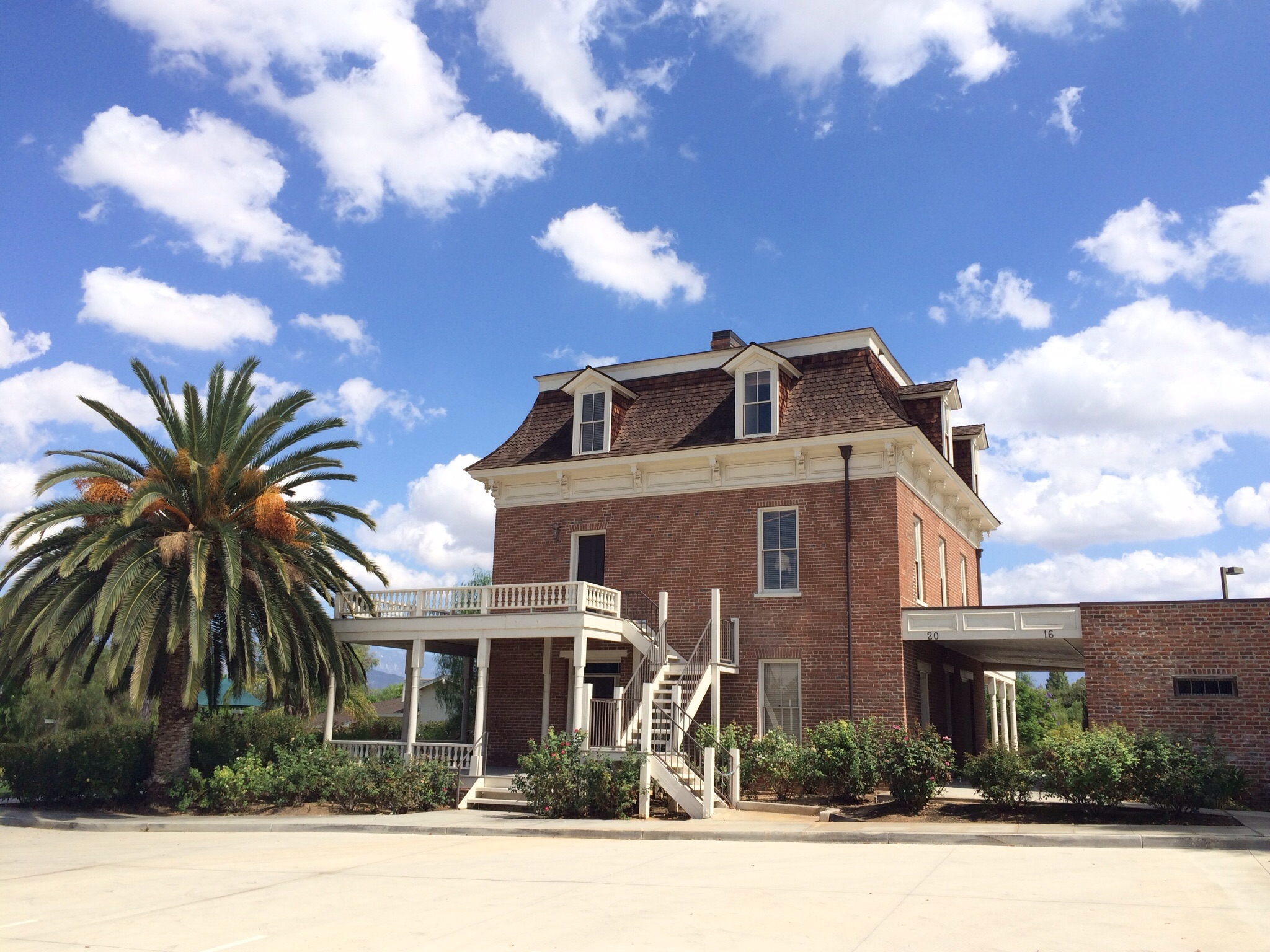
The Barton Villa, home to Barton and his family later in his life. The villa was listed on the National Register of Historic Places in 1996.

In 1859, Barton and his family moved to the Asistencia and sold their San Bernardino home. Around this time, Barton shifted his focus from medicine to ranching and farming. Some sources report that he gave up medicine entirely, while others state he maintained a home office for some time. Barton had the Barton Villa, now the oldest extant house in the city of Redlands, built as a home for him and his family. He served as a member of the California State Assembly in the early 1860s, representing what was then the first district. He died in 1899.

== Legacy ==
Barton Road, which runs between Redlands and Grand Terrace, is named after him. Barton and his sons' real estate holdings would come to be known as the Barton Ranch or Barton Tract, and after being subdivided and sold off into individual house lots, would eventually become the land incorporated as the city of Redlands.

== See also ==
- History of Redlands, California
