= Colusa High School =

Public school in Colusa, California, United States

Location
- 901 Colus Avenue; Colusa, California 95932; United States; 39.20048°N 122.02004°W

Information
- Type: Public
- Established: 1926
- School district: Colusa Unified School District
- Principal: David Johnstone
- Teaching staff: 19.79 (on an FTE basis)
- Grades: 9-12
- Enrollment: 459 (2023–2024)
- Student to teacher ratio: 23.19
- Colors: Cardinal and white
- Athletics: Football, girls' volleyball, girls' tennis, boys' tennis football cheerleading, cross country, boys' basketball, girls' basketball, boys' soccer, girls' soccer, basketball cheerleading, wrestling, baseball, softball, and track
- Mascot: Robbie The RedHawk
- Yearbook: Colus (1916-2010), Redhawk Tales (2010-present)
- Website: Colusa High School

Colusa High School is a public high school located in Colusa, Colusa County, California, United States.

In August 2010, it was featured on the MTV series If You Really Knew Me.

Colusa Grammar School and Colusa High School and Grounds (the 1926 building, which served as a junior high school until 1976) are both listed on the National Register of Historic Places.

== Notable alumni ==
- Doug Mayberry, former NFL player
