= Colusa County Airport =

- IATA: none; ICAO: none; FAA LID: O08

Summary
- Airport type: County of Colusa
- Operator: Colusa, California
- Location: 47
- Elevation AMSL: 14.3 ft (4.4 m)
- Coordinates: 39°10′45″N 121°59′36″W
- Interactive map of Colusa County Airport

Runways
Direction	Length		Surface
Direction	ft	m	Surface
13/31	3,000	914	Asphalt

Colusa County Airport (FAA LID: O08) is a public airport located three miles (4.8 km) south of Colusa, serving Colusa County, California, United States. It is mostly used for general aviation.

== Facilities ==
Colusa County Airport covers 81 acres and has one runway:

- Runway 13/31: 3,000 x 60 ft (914 x 18 m), surface: asphalt
