= Colusa High School and Grounds =

- U.S. National Register of Historic Places
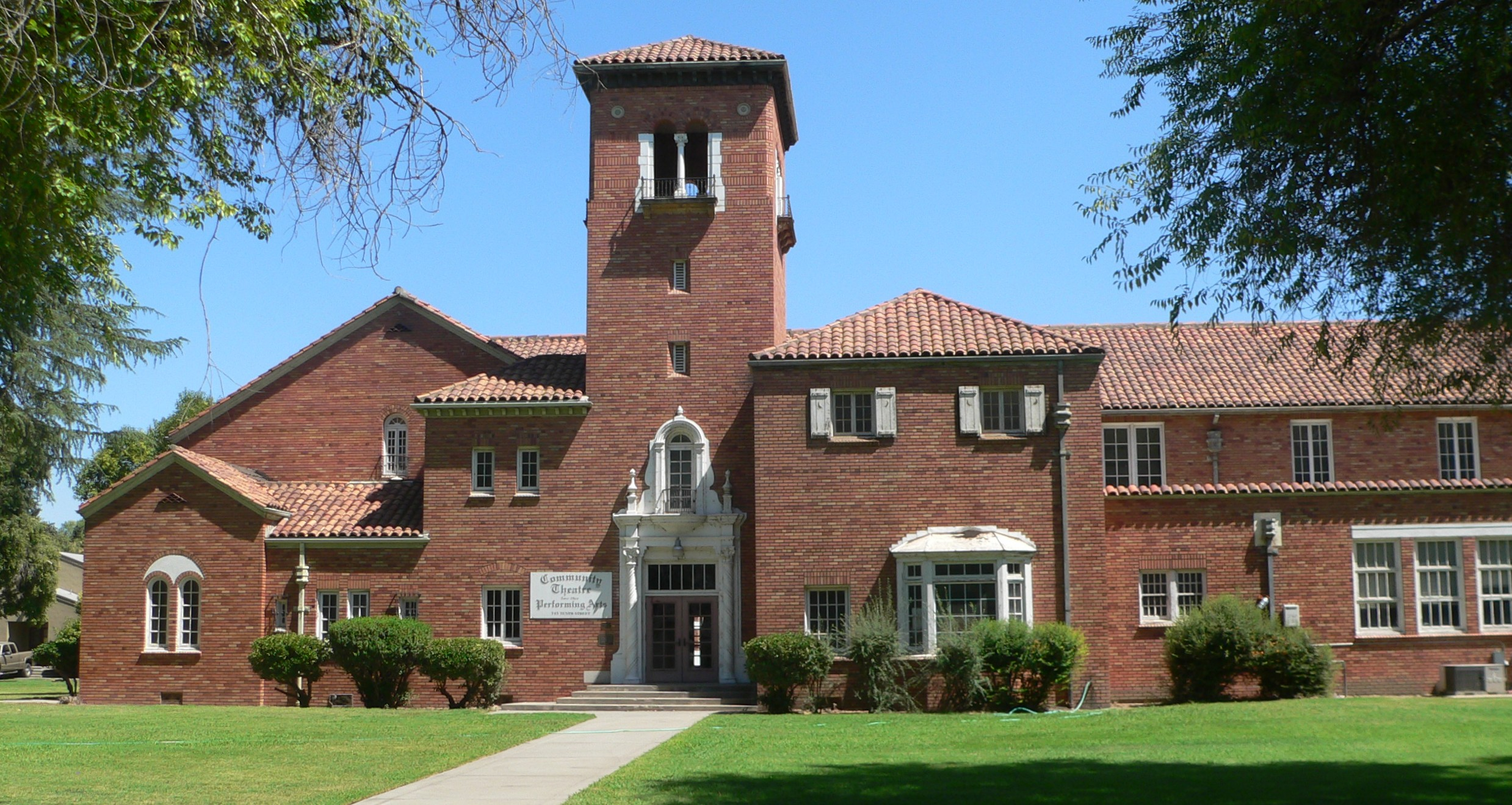

- Location within California
- Location: 745 10th St., Colusa, California
- Coordinates: 39°12′36″N 122°00′59″W
- Area: 3 acres (1.2 ha)
- Built: 1925-26
- Architect: George C. Sellon
- Architectural style: Late 19th And 20th Century Revivals, Mediterranean Revival
- NRHP reference No.: 76000479
- Added to NRHP: August 13, 1976

The Colusa High School and Grounds, at 745 10th St. in Colusa, California, was built during 1925 to 1926. It was listed on the National Register of Historic Places in 1976. It was built as a high school in 1926 and later served as a junior high school, until 1976. At the time of its National Register nomination it was most commonly known as the Old Colusa Junior High School.

It was then the third home of the Colusa High School, having replaced the second building of the which was built in 1903.

It was designed by architect George C. Sellon and was intended to serve 300 students. It was funded by a $200,000 bond.

It is a two-story, 252 by 82 feet (77 m × 25 m) building, with a 60 feet (18 m) tower over its main entrance.

It is Mediterranean Revival in style.
