= Saint Mary's Parish (Red Bluff, California) =

Historic church in California, United States

- U.S. National Register of Historic Places
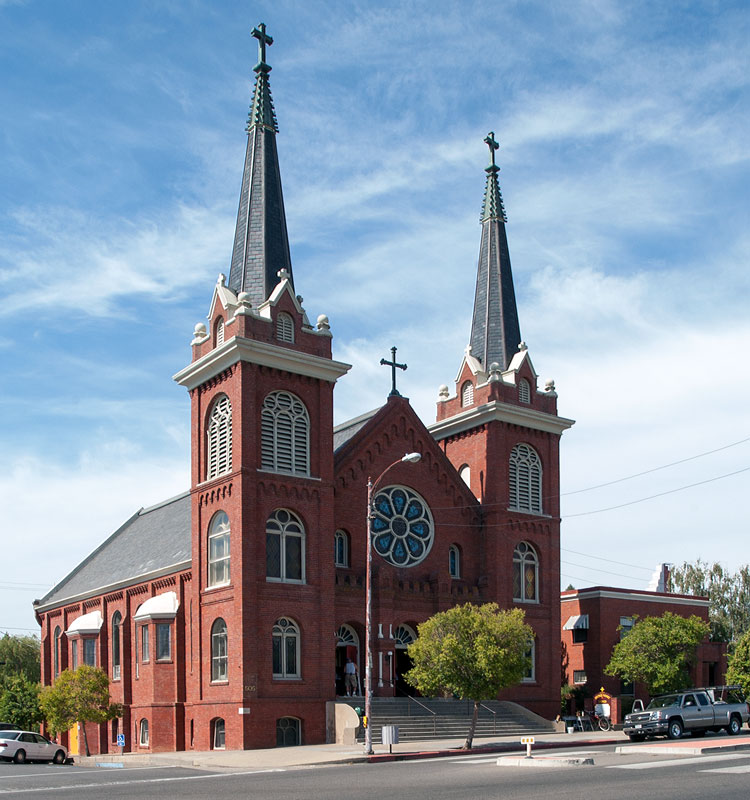

- Location within California Location within the United States
- Location: 515 Main St., Red Bluff, California
- Coordinates: 40°10′32″N 122°13′58″W
- Area: 0.2 acres (0.081 ha)
- Built: 1906
- Architect: William Henry Weeks
- Architectural style: Gothic, Romanesque
- NRHP reference No.: 82002278
- Added to NRHP: February 4, 1982

Saint Mary's Parish (Sacred Heart Catholic Church) is a historic church at 515 Main Street in Red Bluff, California.

It was built in 1906 and added to the National Register in 1982.

== See also ==
- National Register of Historic Places listings in Tehama County, California
