= Colusa County Courthouse =

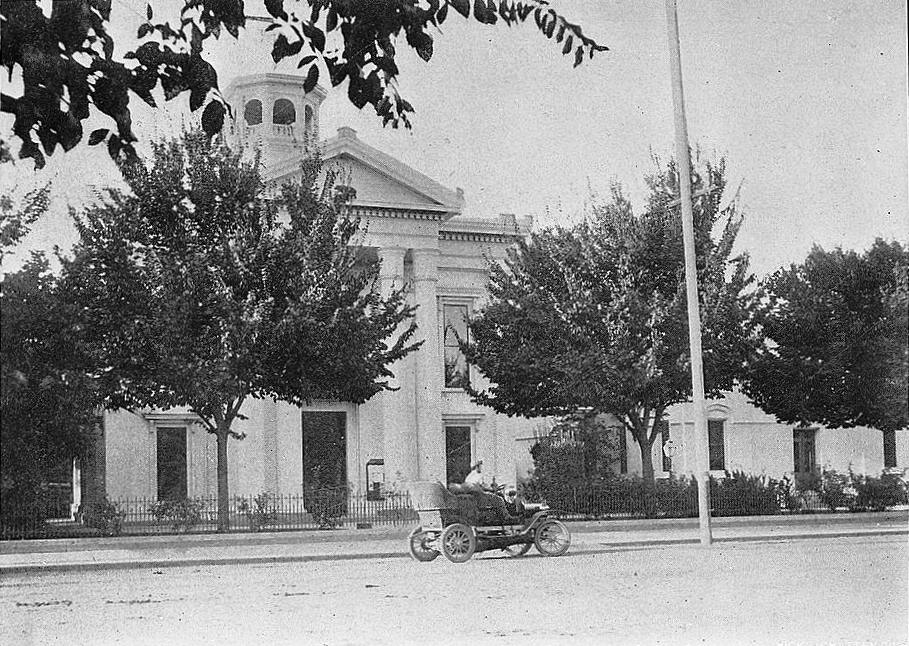
- Colusa County Courthouse, 1908

- Location within California
- 39.21402°N 122.00853°W
- Location: 547 Market Street, Colusa, California

Site notes
- Architectural style: Greek Revival

California Historical Landmark
- Reference no.: 890

The Colusa County Courthouse, in Colusa, California was erected in 1861. This Greek Revival style building is the oldest remaining courthouse in the Sacramento Valley. The "Southern" style reflects the county's heritage and states' rights sympathies during the American Civil War, largely due to the influence of the local newspaper editor Will S. Green. In its early years, the courthouse also served as a center for cultural, social, and religious activities. The courthouse is California Historical Landmark #890, a designation it received in 1976.

The courthouse, constructed of brick and later covered in plaster, cost $21,000 to build. A golden bear statue stands above the front door, atop four 30-foot columns. Originally, the building had a large dome on the roof, but it was removed not long after the courthouse's construction because it leaked. The building is now topped by a cupola that holds a bell.

The courthouse is home to a statue of George Washington that was given to the county after the 1860 election. Colusa County voters donated more money per voter to fund construction of the Washington Monument, in Washington, D.C., than voters anywhere else in California. The county received the statue in recognition.

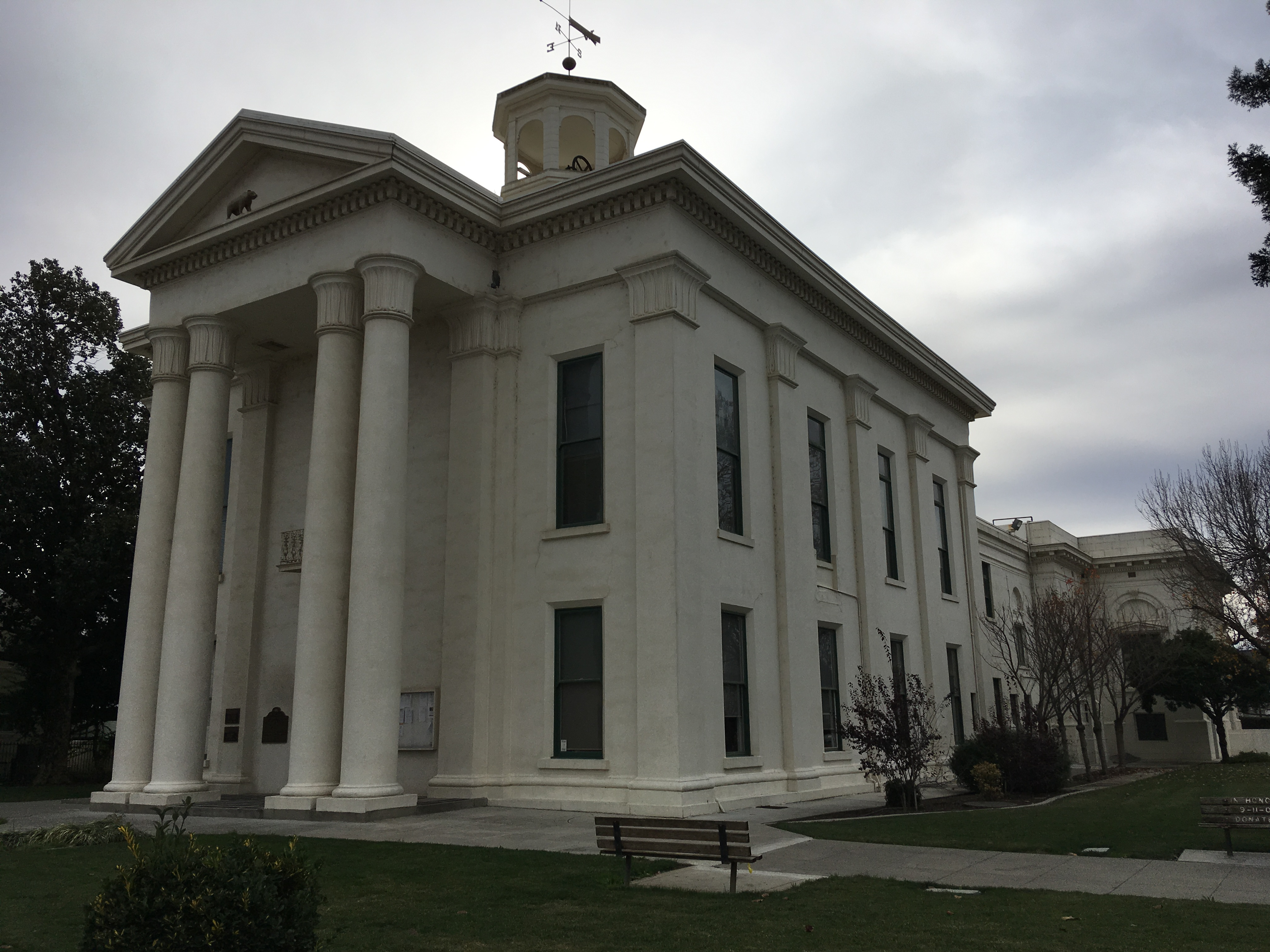
Colusa County Courthouse, 2018
