= Grand Island Shrine =

- U.S. National Register of Historic Places
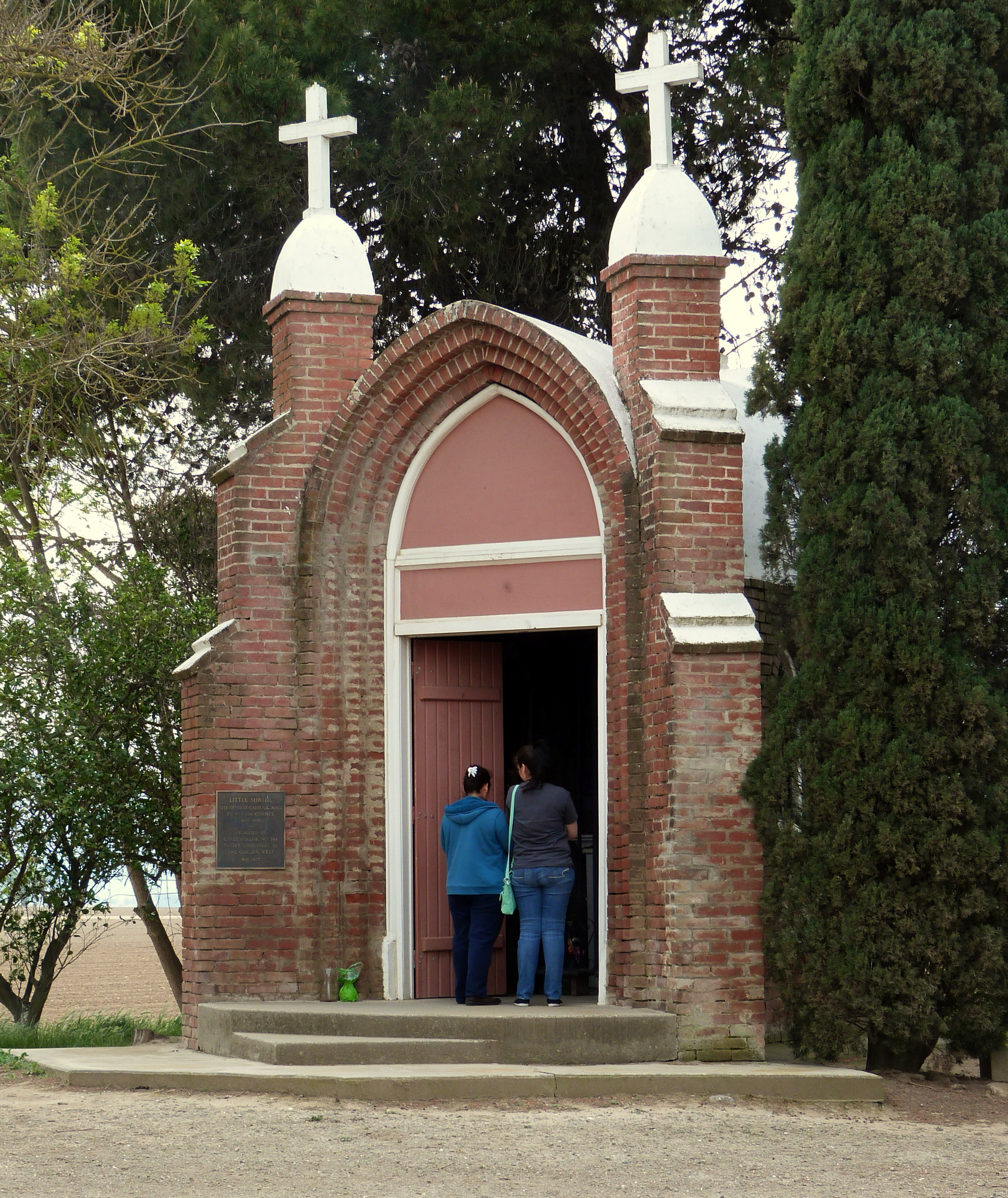
- The Grand Island Shrine in 2015

- Location within California Location within the United States
- Nearest city: Colusa, California
- Coordinates: 39°06′56″N 121°56′15″W
- Area: 0.5 acres (0.20 ha)
- Built: 1883
- Built by: Wallrath, Father Michael
- Architectural style: Gothic
- NRHP reference No.: 74000508
- Added to NRHP: December 31, 1974

The Grand Island Shrine, near Colusa, California, was built in 1883. It has also been known as the Little Shrine at Sycamore.

It was listed on the National Register of Historic Places in 1974. According to its NRHP nomination, it is significant as "a unique example of vernacular or folk architecture. The initial impact of suddenly sighting a small Gothic structure 100 yards off the highway in the middle of an open barley field lends to its uniqueness." It was designed and built Father Michael Wallrath, who also hand kilned its bricks. It is located on the site of the First Mass in Colusa County.
