= Cecil Ranch =

- U.S. National Register of Historic Places
- Location within California
- Location: 1840 CA 45, Grimes, California
- Coordinates: 39.091378°N 121.901132°W
- Area: 1.7 acres (0.69 ha)
- Built: 1909
- Architect: Alden Campbell
- Architectural style: Queen Anne, Craftsman, Colonial Revival
- NRHP reference No.: 03000988
- Added to NRHP: May 14, 2004

The Cecil Ranch, in Grimes, California in Colusa County, California, United States, was listed on the National Register of Historic Places in 2004. The listing included seven contributing buildings and a contributing structure on 1.7 acres (0.69 ha).

It is a complex of buildings mostly dating from around the 1909 construction year of the main house.

The main house is a two-and-a-half-story woodframe house upon a brick foundation. It was designed by Sacramento architect Alden Campbell and is somewhat similar to other houses he designed in that city, but is unusual in its rural area. It reflects a mix of architectural styles: Queen Anne in its variation of exterior sheathing textures for each story, Craftsman for its clinker brick porch bases, secondary story base, chimney, and some of the bracketing, and Colonial Revival for its Tuscan columns, balustrades, enclosed gables and "rather trim formal image".

Its address is 1840 CA 45 in Grimes. The complex is located on what is now an oxbow lake named Cecil Lake, which was formerly a bend in the Sacramento River, altered by levees.
