= Colusa Unified School District =

School district in California

Address
- 745 10th Street Colusa, California, 95932; United States

District information
- Type: Public
- Grades: K–12
- NCES District ID: 0609570

Students and staff
- Students: 1,529
- Teachers: 72.1 (FTE)
- Staff: 45.75 (FTE)
- Student–teacher ratio: 21.21:1

Other information
- Website: www.colusa.k12.ca.us

Colusa Unified School District is located in Colusa, California. The district is formed by the following three schools: Burchfield Primary School, Egling Middle School, and Colusa High School; which currently have 34, 31 and 26 staff members, respectively. The Burchfield Primary School's mascot is the BraveHawks, the Egling Middle School's mascot is RiverHawks and Colusa High School's is the RedHawks. The mascots for the three schools were changed to a Non-Native American name through a voting process effective August 2011. In addition to these physical schools, the district also has a Colusa Alternative Home School which assists families with the desire to educate children at home.
