= Colusa, California =

City in California, United States

- City
- City of Colusa
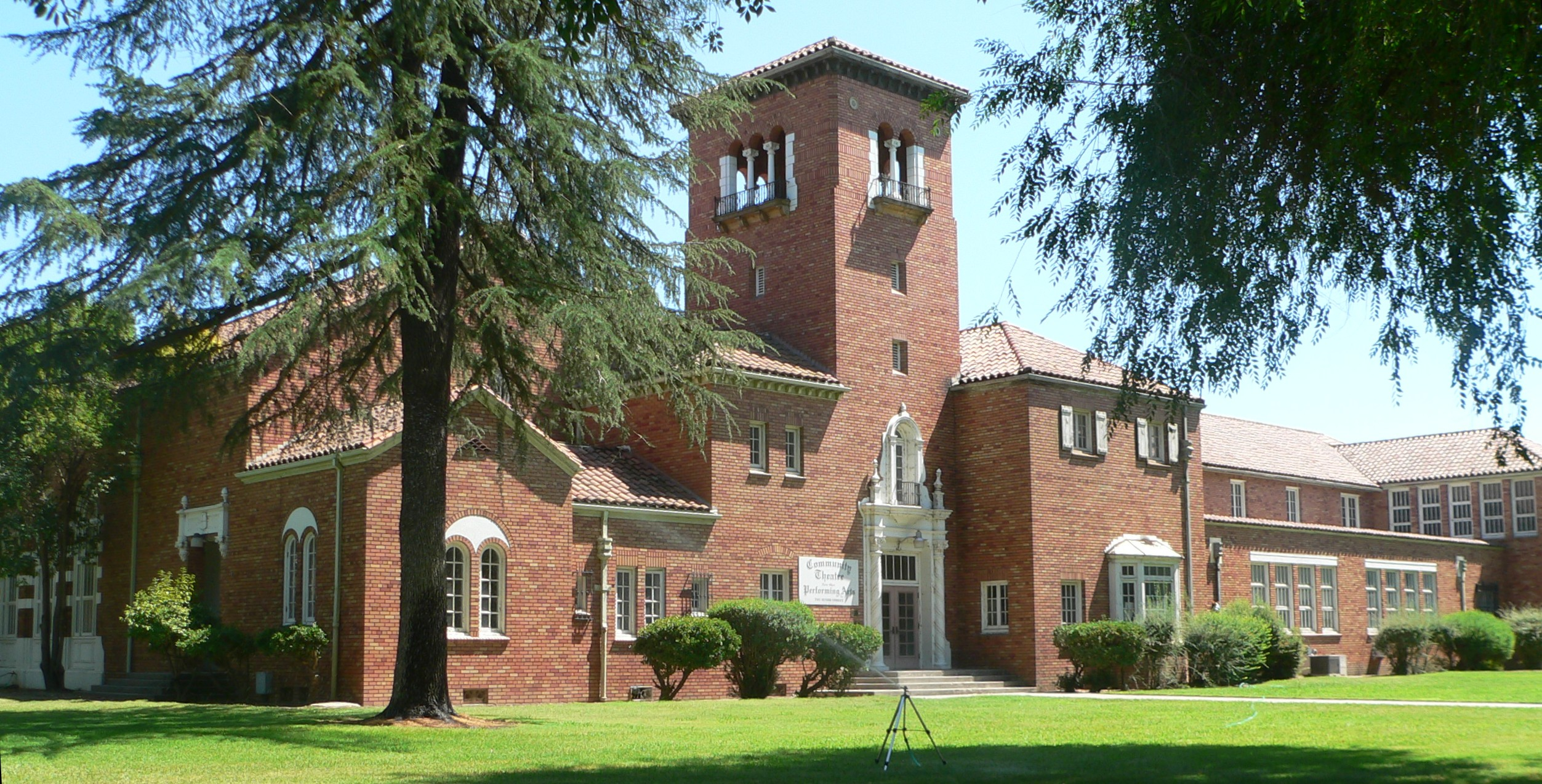
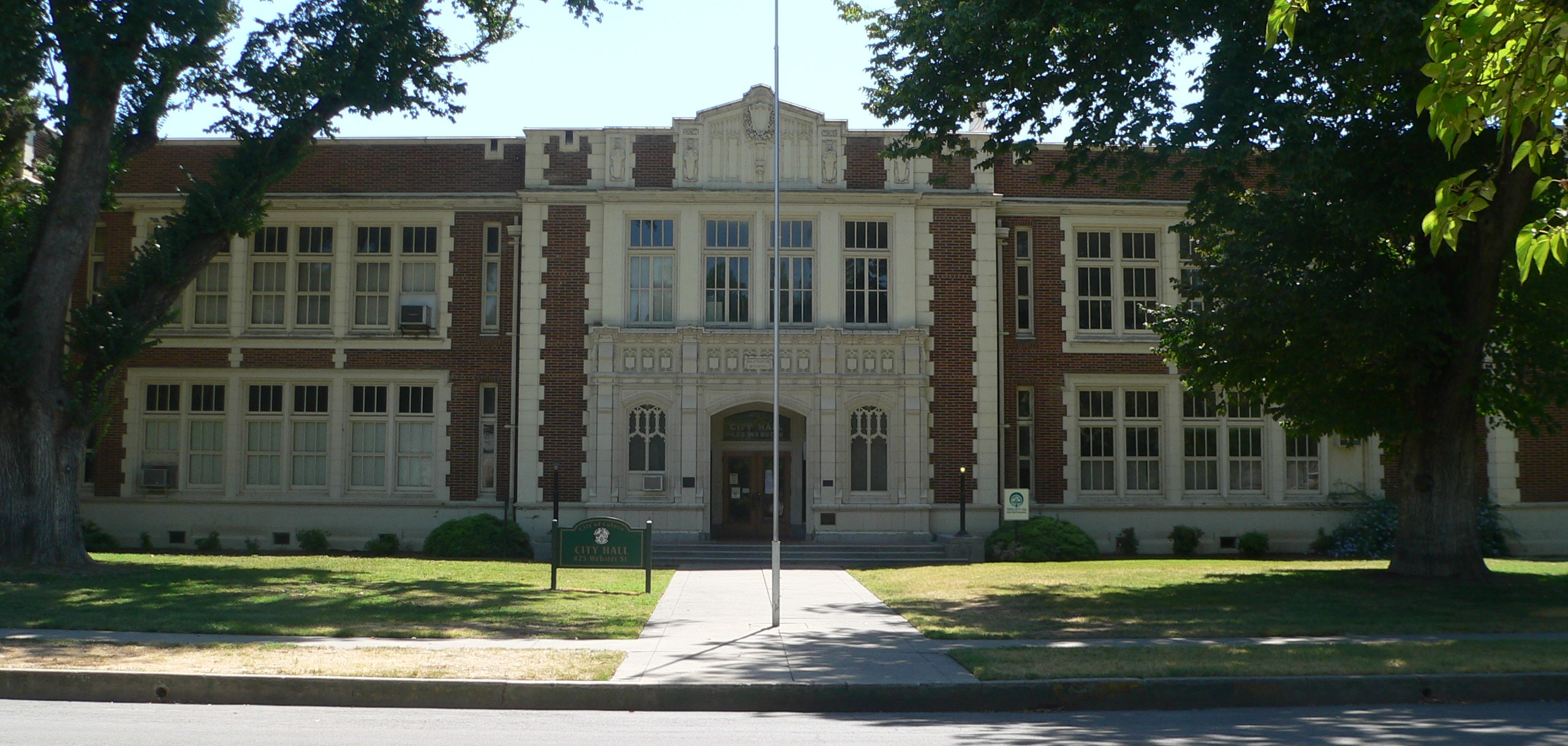
- Top: Old Colusa High School; bottom: Colusa City Hall.

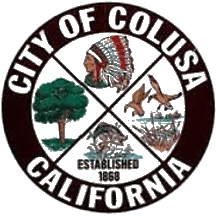
- Seal
- Interactive map of Colusa, California
- Location in the United States
- Coordinates: 39°12′52″N 122°00′34″W
- Country: United States
- State: California
- County: Colusa
- Incorporated: June 16, 1868

Area
  - Total: 3.42 sq mi (8.87 km^{2})
  - Land: 3.42 sq mi (8.87 km^{2})
  - Water: 0 sq mi (0.00 km^{2}) 0%
- Elevation: 49 ft (15 m)

Population (2020)
  - Total: 6,411
  - Density: 1,872.4/sq mi (722.93/km^{2})
- Time zone: UTC-8 (Pacific)
  - Summer (DST): UTC-7 (PDT)
- ZIP code: 95932
- Area code: 530, 837
- FIPS code: 06-14946
- GNIS feature IDs: 277602, 2410204
- Website: www.cityofcolusa.com

Colusa is a city in and the county seat of Colusa County, California, United States, located in the Sacramento Valley region of the Central Valley. The population was 6,411 at the 2020 census, up from 5,971 at the 2010 census. Colusa originates from the local Coru Native American tribe, who in the 1840s lived on the opposite side of the Sacramento River.

== History ==
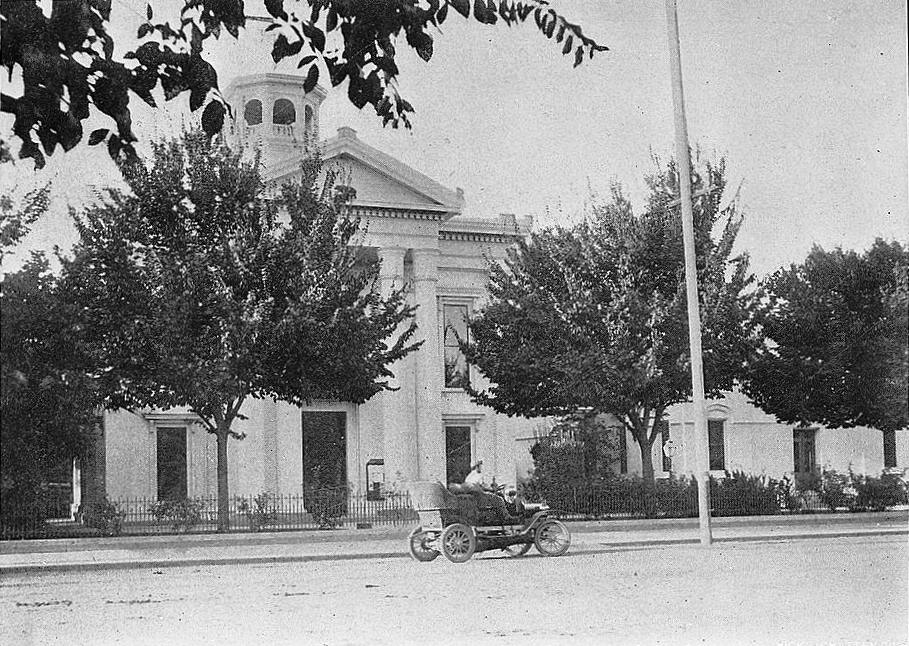
Colusa County Courthouse in 1908

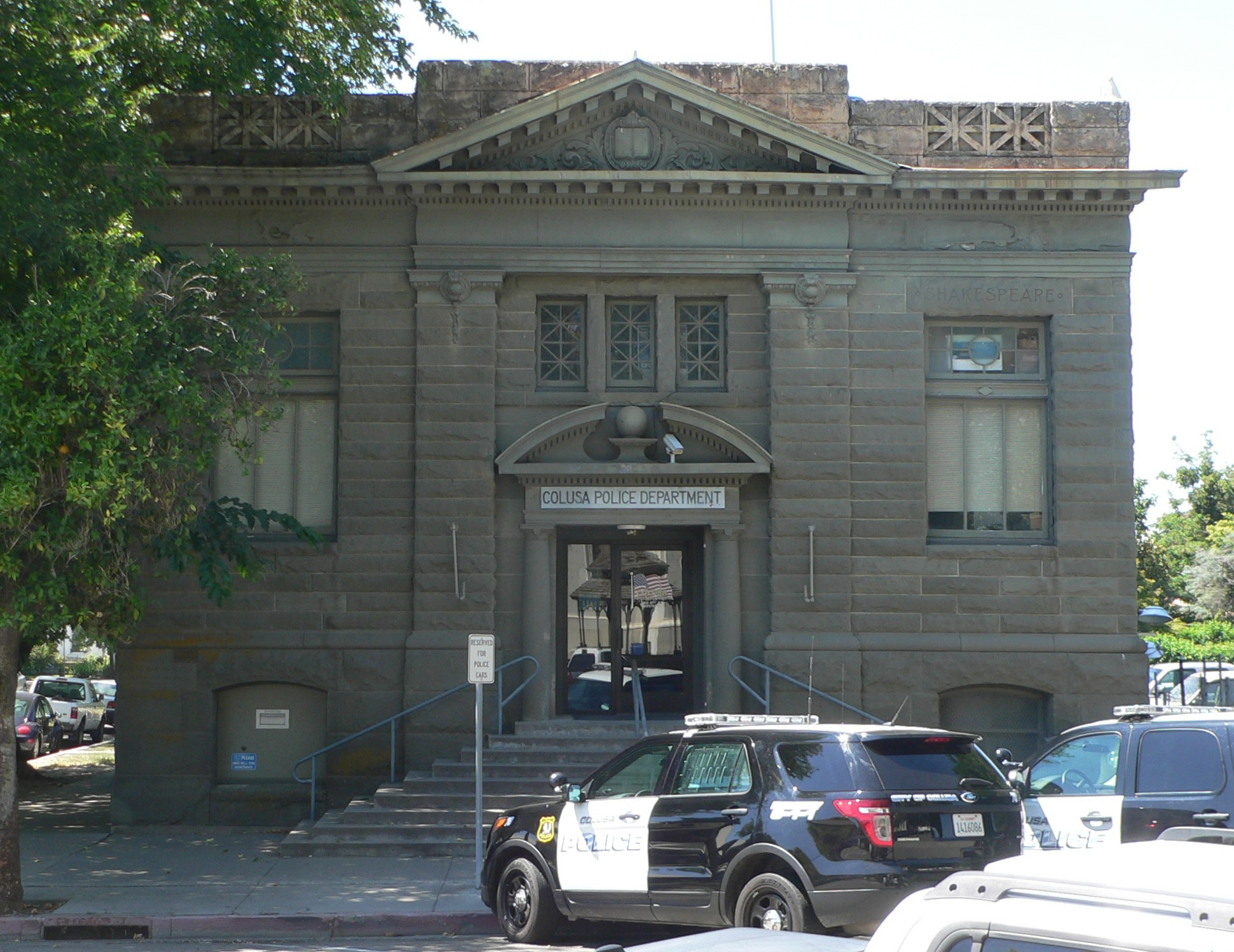
The former Colusa Carnegie Library was built in 1906.

In 1850, Charles D. Semple purchased the Rancho Colus Mexican land grant on which Colusa was founded and called the place Salmon Bend. The town was founded, under the name Colusi, by Semple in 1850. The first post office was established the following year, 1851. The California legislature changed the town's (and the county's) name to Colusa in 1854. The town flourished due to its location on the Southern Pacific Railroad. Several travelers rest stops were established at various road distances from Colusa, including Five Mile House, Seven Mile House, Nine Mile House, Ten Mile House, Eleven Mile House, Fourteen Mile House (also called Sterling Ranch), Sixteen Mile House (at the current location of Princeton), and Seventeen Mile House. The original settlement of what became Colusa was originally placed at the site of Seven Mile House but subsequently removed to its current site in 1850.

=== Lynching of Hong Di ===
On July 10, 1887, convicted murderer Hong Di, an immigrant from China, was dragged from the Colusa jail and was forced by over a hundred and fifty men through the streets of Colusa's Chinatown, before he was hanged from the rafters of the locomotive turntable of the Colusa and Lake Railroad. Di, who had worked as a servant for the Billiou family of St. Johns, California, had shot and killed his employer Julie Billiou on April 7, 1887. He was captured on May 22, 1887, near Gridley, California.

== Geography ==
According to the United States Census Bureau, the city has a total area of 3.4 square miles (8.8 km^{2}), all land. According to the United States Geological Survey, the city's location is at 39°12′52″N 122°00′34″W.

Colusa is on the Sacramento River, which has a high levee so that the river is not clearly apparent from the city.

Colusa features a historic Chinatown, Carnegie Library building constructed in 1905, and an architecturally noteworthy courthouse built in a classical style, among its historically notable buildings.

=== Climate ===
According to the Köppen Climate Classification system, Colusa has a warm-summer Mediterranean climate, abbreviated "Csa" on climate maps.

Climate data for Colusa, California, 1991–2020 normals, extremes 1893–present
Month	Jan	Feb	Mar	Apr	May	Jun	Jul	Aug	Sep	Oct	Nov	Dec	Year
Record high °F (°C)	78 (26)	81 (27)	92 (33)	98 (37)	106 (41)	112 (44)	112 (44)	114 (46)	114 (46)	105 (41)	89 (32)	76 (24)	114 (46)
Mean maximum °F (°C)	66.1 (18.9)	71.6 (22.0)	79.3 (26.3)	88.8 (31.6)	95.6 (35.3)	102.1 (38.9)	104.7 (40.4)	102.4 (39.1)	100.8 (38.2)	92.4 (33.6)	76.7 (24.8)	65.2 (18.4)	105.9 (41.1)
Mean daily maximum °F (°C)	54.6 (12.6)	60.2 (15.7)	66.5 (19.2)	73.4 (23.0)	81.1 (27.3)	88.2 (31.2)	92.4 (33.6)	91.7 (33.2)	89.1 (31.7)	79.0 (26.1)	64.1 (17.8)	54.5 (12.5)	74.6 (23.7)
Daily mean °F (°C)	46.4 (8.0)	50.7 (10.4)	55.1 (12.8)	59.7 (15.4)	67.3 (19.6)	73.4 (23.0)	76.2 (24.6)	74.9 (23.8)	71.8 (22.1)	63.5 (17.5)	53.0 (11.7)	46.1 (7.8)	61.5 (16.4)
Mean daily minimum °F (°C)	38.2 (3.4)	41.1 (5.1)	43.8 (6.6)	46.1 (7.8)	53.4 (11.9)	58.7 (14.8)	59.9 (15.5)	58.1 (14.5)	54.4 (12.4)	47.9 (8.8)	41.8 (5.4)	37.7 (3.2)	48.4 (9.1)
Mean minimum °F (°C)	29.8 (−1.2)	32.4 (0.2)	34.9 (1.6)	36.0 (2.2)	43.8 (6.6)	50.1 (10.1)	52.8 (11.6)	52.1 (11.2)	47.4 (8.6)	40.1 (4.5)	31.7 (−0.2)	28.8 (−1.8)	26.3 (−3.2)
Record low °F (°C)	17 (−8)	20 (−7)	24 (−4)	24 (−4)	31 (−1)	34 (1)	35 (2)	42 (6)	35 (2)	31 (−1)	22 (−6)	14 (−10)	14 (−10)
Average precipitation inches (mm)	3.59 (91)	2.97 (75)	2.19 (56)	1.00 (25)	0.84 (21)	0.51 (13)	0.01 (0.25)	0.03 (0.76)	0.11 (2.8)	0.87 (22)	1.91 (49)	3.17 (81)	17.2 (436.81)
Average precipitation days	10.6	8.6	8.2	5.0	3.0	1.0	0.1	0.2	0.5	2.6	5.8	9.3	54.9
Source 1: NOAA
Source 2: XMACIS2

==== Climate events ====
During December 1996–January 1997, the nearby Colusa Weir Gauge reached flood stage. This historic flooding event devastated the region by destroying thousands of crop acres (rice, tomatoes, alfalfa) and property. The Colusa Weir Gauge reached flood stage 68.67 feet (20.93 m) on January 3, 1997.

== Film production ==
The crime drama movie ...tick...tick...tick... (1970), starring Jim Brown, was filmed in downtown Colusa, featuring the historic courthouse. The setting of the film in Mississippi is referred to as "Colusa County". The movie explores what happens when an African-American is elected sheriff for the town.

== Demographics ==
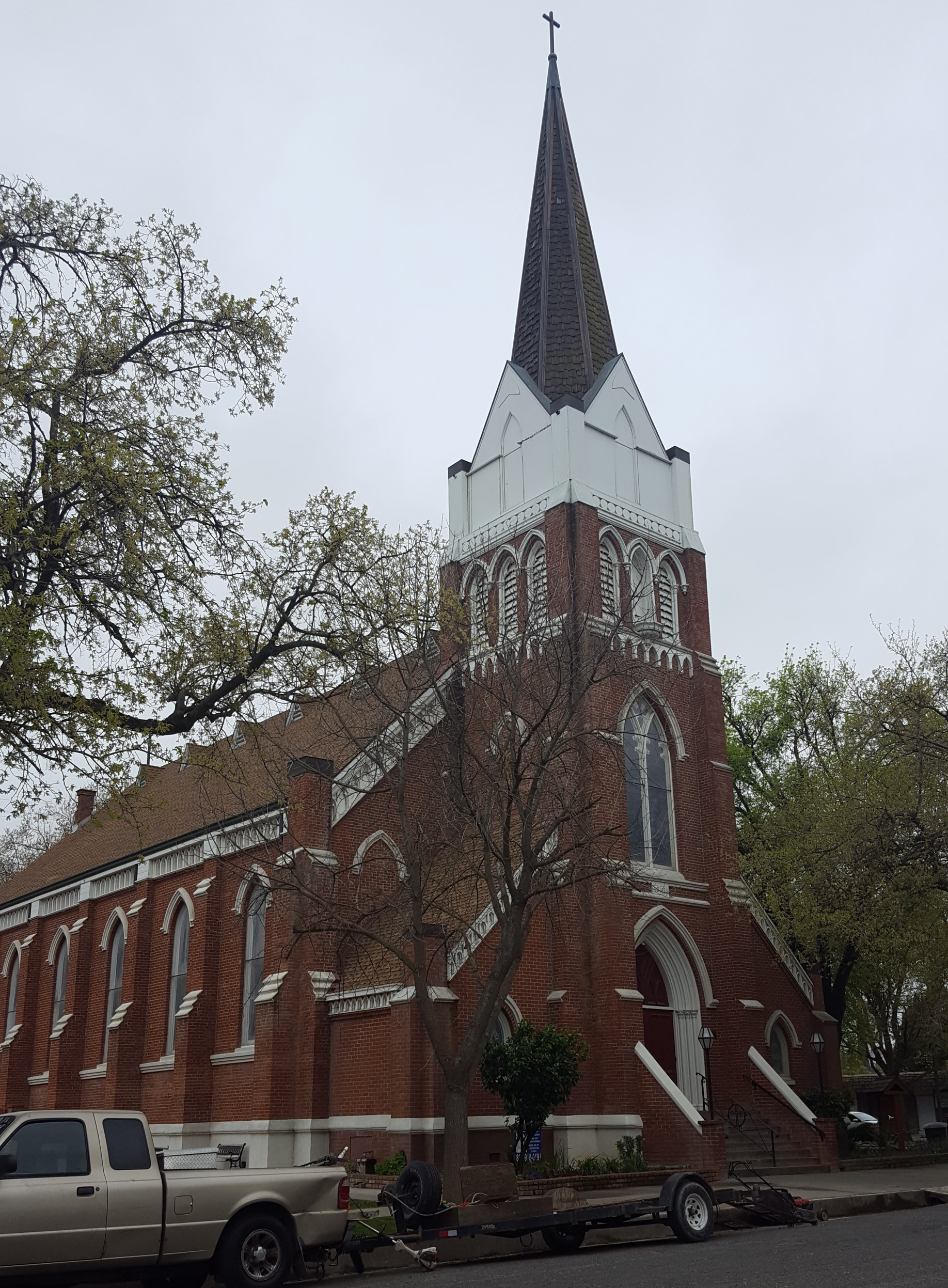
Our Lady of Lourdes Catholic Church, a parish of the Roman Catholic Diocese of Sacramento.

Historical population
Census	Pop.	Note	%±
1870	1,051		—
1880	1,779		69.3%
1890	1,336		−24.9%
1900	1,441		7.9%
1910	1,582		9.8%
1920	1,846		16.7%
1930	2,116		14.6%
1940	2,285		8.0%
1950	3,031		32.6%
1960	3,518		16.1%
1970	3,842		9.2%
1980	4,075		6.1%
1990	4,934		21.1%
2000	5,402		9.5%
2010	5,971		10.5%
2020	6,411		7.4%
U.S. Decennial Census

=== 2020 census ===
As of the 2020 census, Colusa had a population of 6,411. The population density was 1,872.4 inhabitants per square mile (722.9/km^{2}). The census reported that 98.4% of the population lived in households, 0.2% lived in non-institutionalized group quarters, and 1.4% were institutionalized. 98.8% of residents lived in urban areas, while 1.2% lived in rural areas.

The age distribution was 27.8% under the age of 18, 7.9% aged 18 to 24, 25.5% aged 25 to 44, 23.3% aged 45 to 64, and 15.5% who were 65 years of age or older. The median age was 36.3 years. For every 100 females there were 99.0 males, and for every 100 females age 18 and over there were 96.6 males age 18 and over.

There were 2,255 households in Colusa, of which 41.0% had children under the age of 18 living in them. Of all households, 47.3% were married-couple households, 7.8% were cohabiting couple households, 17.3% were households with a male householder and no spouse or partner present, and 27.7% were households with a female householder and no spouse or partner present. About 24.5% of all households were made up of individuals and 12.5% had someone living alone who was 65 years of age or older. The average household size was 2.8. There were 1,571 families (69.7% of all households).

There were 2,417 housing units at an average density of 705.9 units per square mile (272.5 units/km^{2}), of which 2,255 (93.3%) were occupied. Of occupied units, 56.5% were owner-occupied and 43.5% were occupied by renters. Of all housing units, 6.7% were vacant. The homeowner vacancy rate was 1.0% and the rental vacancy rate was 6.1%.

Racial composition as of the 2020 census
Race	Number	Percent
White	2,846	44.4%
Black or African American	63	1.0%
American Indian and Alaska Native	118	1.8%
Asian	91	1.4%
Native Hawaiian and Other Pacific Islander	39	0.6%
Some other race	1,951	30.4%
Two or more races	1,303	20.3%
Hispanic or Latino (of any race)	3,757	58.6%

=== Income and poverty ===
In 2023, the US Census Bureau estimated that the median household income was $68,750, and the per capita income was $31,144. About 13.7% of families and 16.3% of the population were below the poverty line.

=== 2010 census ===
At the 2010 census Colusa had a population of 5,971. The population density was 3,255.3 inhabitants per square mile (1,256.9/km^{2}). The racial makeup of Colusa was 3,944 (66.1%) White, 54 (0.9%) African American, 107 (1.8%) Native American, 80 (1.3%) Asian, 28 (0.5%) Pacific Islander, 1,510 (25.3%) from other races, and 248 (4.2%) from two or more races. Hispanic or Latino of any race were 3,128 persons (52.4%).

The census reported that 5,916 people (99.1% of the population) lived in households, 4 (0.1%) lived in non-institutionalized group quarters, and 51 (0.9%) were institutionalized.

There were 2,142 households, 890 (41.5%) had children under the age of 18 living in them, 1,080 (50.4%) were opposite-sex married couples living together, 290 (13.5%) had a female householder with no husband present, 135 (6.3%) had a male householder with no wife present. There were 128 (6.0%) unmarried opposite-sex partnerships, and 13 (0.6%) same-sex married couples or partnerships. 555 households (25.9%) were one person and 224 (10.5%) had someone living alone who was 65 or older. The average household size was 2.76. There were 1,505 families (70.3% of households); the average family size was 3.35.

The age distribution was 1,789 people (30.0%) under the age of 18, 484 people (8.1%) aged 18 to 24, 1,566 people (26.2%) aged 25 to 44, 1,435 people (24.0%) aged 45 to 64, and 697 people (11.7%) who were 65 or older. The median age was 33.5 years. For every 100 females, there were 100.1 males. For every 100 females age 18 and over, there were 96.2 males.

The median value of a home was $196,400. There were 2,282 housing units at an average density of 1,244.1 units per square mile (480.3 units/km^{2}), of which 2,142 were occupied, 1,191 (55.6%) by the owners and 951 (44.4%) by renters. The homeowner vacancy rate was 1.4%; the rental vacancy rate was 2.3%. 3,233 people (54.1% of the population) lived in owner-occupied housing units and 2,683 people (44.9%) lived in rental housing units.

== Economy ==
Colusa County industry is dominated by agriculture, primarily in rice crops and tree nuts like almonds and walnuts. It's one of the top rice producing counties in the United States with over 135,000 acres harvested in 2016.

Major employers in Colusa include Colusa County and Colusa Unified School District. Sunsweet Growers has a plant just outside of city limits.

== Politics ==
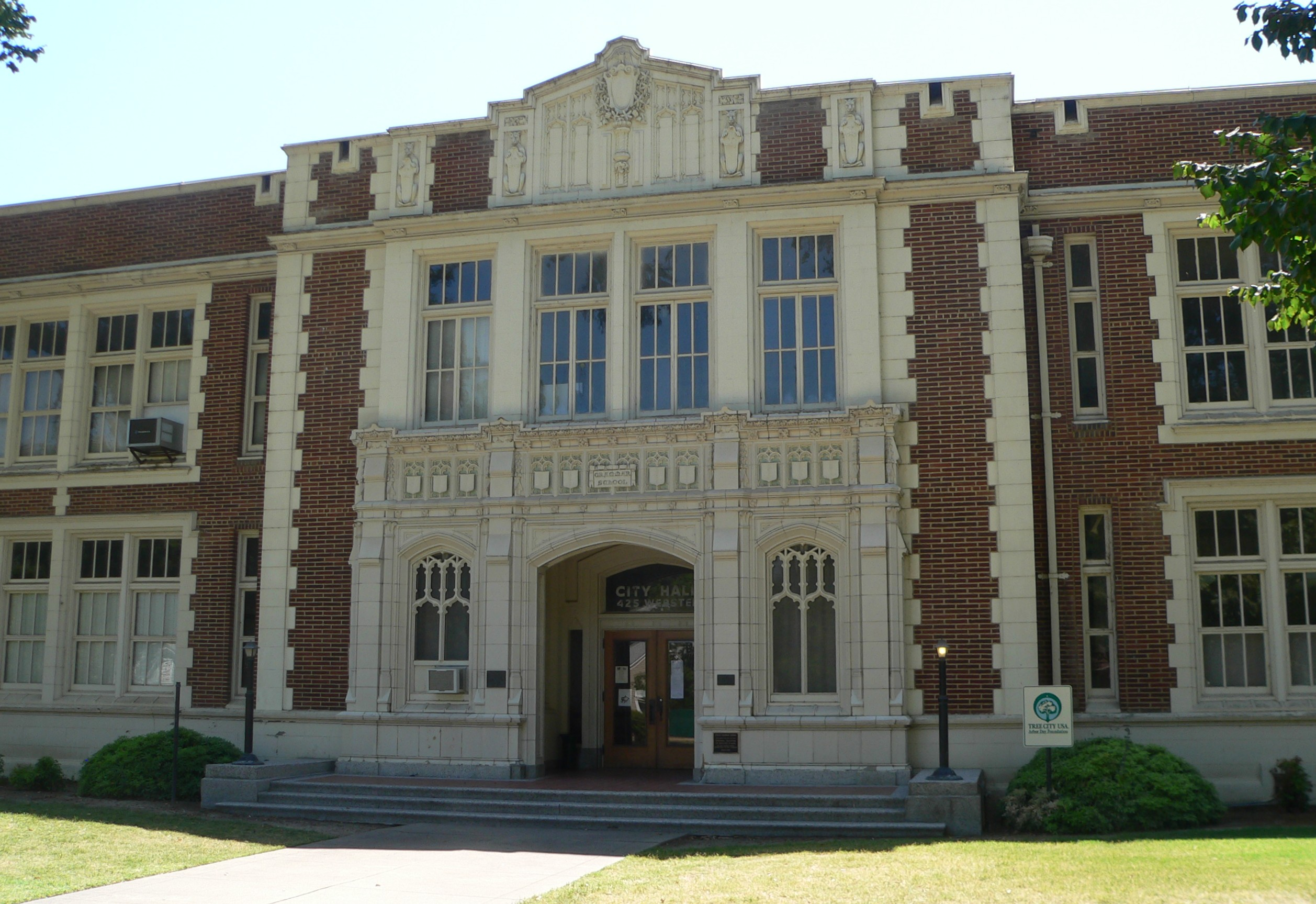
Colusa City Hall.

In the state legislature, Colusa is in the 1st senatorial district, represented by Republican Megan Dahle, and the 4th Assembly district, represented by Democrat Cecilia Aguiar-Curry. Federally, Colusa is in California's 1st congressional district, represented by Republican James Gallagher.

== Education ==
Colusa is served by the Colusa Unified School District, formed by three schools: Burchfield Primary School, Egling Middle School, and Colusa High School. The high school's mascot is the Redhawks. Starting in the 2011–12 academic year, the name of the high school mascot was changed from the Redskins to the Redhawks amid controversy over using names and insignia deemed derogatory toward Native Americans.

== Notable people ==
- Bill Cunningham, Major League Baseball player
- Byron De La Beckwith, convicted assassin of civil rights activist Medgar Evers
- Mike Griffin, Major League Baseball pitcher
