= Business routes of Interstate 5 =

Interstate 5 Business

Location
- Country: United States

Highway system
- Interstate Highway System; Main; Auxiliary; Suffixed; Business; Future

Business routes of Interstate 5 (I-5) exist in both California and Washington. There are no business routes in Oregon as that state does not assign such designations for any of its Interstate Highways. However, Oregon Route 99 (OR 99) essentially acts as a business route for most of Oregon, along with OR 99W and OR 99E, which also has its own business route in Salem.

== California ==
Interstate business routes in California are assigned by the California Department of Transportation (Caltrans), but are not maintained by Caltrans unless they overlay other routes of the state highway system. Local authorities may request route assignment from the Caltrans Transportation System Information Program, and all requests require approval of the executive committee of the American Association of State Highway and Transportation Officials (AASHTO).

=== Chula Vista business loop ===
Interstate 5 Business
- Location: San Ysidro–National City
- Existed: 1960s–1990s

Interstate 5 Business (I-5 Bus.) was a business route of I-5 in San Ysidro, Chula Vista, and National City. I-5 Bus. followed the original routing of US Route 101 (US 101) along Beyer Boulevard, Broadway, Harbor Drive, and Pacific Highway. The route terminated at I-5 at both ends.

The designation was assigned in the 1960s and removed in the 1990s.

=== San Diego business loop ===
Interstate 5 Business
- Location: San Diego
- Existed: 2004–2005

Interstate 5 Business (I-5 Bus.) was a business route of I-5 in San Diego. I-5 Bus. followed the original routing of US 101 along Mission Bay Drive and terminated at I-5 at both ends. The designation was removed in late 2004 and early 2005.

=== Irvine business spur ===
Interstate 5 Business
- Location: Irvine

Interstate 5 Business (I-5 Bus.) is a business route of I-5, starting at I-5 in Irvine and ending at Barranca Parkway in Irvine, traveling via Jamboree Road. The spur intersects with State Route 261 (SR 261) adjacent to the northern terminus of the spur.

=== Glendale–San Fernando Valley business loop ===
Interstate 5 Business
- Location: Glendale–San Fernando Valley

Interstate 5 Business (I-5 Bus.) in Glendale, Burbank, and the San Fernando Valley was a business loop of I-5 that followed present-day San Fernando Road in the 1970s. Prior to the construction of I-5, San Fernando Road was an alignment of US 6 and US 99.

=== Woodland business loop ===
Interstate 5 Business
- Location: Woodland

Interstate 5 Business (I-5 Bus.) in Woodland begins at I-5 exit 537, runs west on Main Street (known as County Road 22 [CR 22] outside city limits), and then north on SR 16 (County Road 98 [CR 98], CR E7) to exit 541.

Major intersections

The entire route is in Yolo County.

Location	mi	km	Destinations	Notes
Woodland			East Main Street	Continuation beyond I-5; former SR 16 east
Woodland			I-5 south – Sacramento	Interchange; southern terminus; I-5 north exit 537
Woodland			SR 113 to I-5 north – Yuba City, Redding, Davis	Interchange; SR 113 exit 37
Woodland			East Street	Serves Yolo County Fairgrounds; former US 40 Alt. / SR 113
Woodland			SR 16 west to I-505 / Road 98 (CR E7 south)	South end of SR 16 / CR E7 overlap
			I-5 – Sacramento, Redding	Interchange; northern terminus; north end of SR 16 / CR E7 overlap; eastern terminus of SR 16 western segment; northern terminus of CR E7; I-5 exit 541
			Road 18	Continuation beyond I-5
1.000 mi = 1.609 km; 1.000 km = 0.621 mi: Concurrency terminus

=== Arbuckle business loop ===
Interstate 5 Business
- Location: Arbuckle
- Length: 1.1 mi (1.8 km)

Interstate 5 Business (I-5 Bus.) in Arbuckle, at 1.1 miles (1.8 km), begins at I-5 exit 566, an interchange with no northbound reentry. The route runs seamlessly north from the offramp to Fifth Street through downtown Arbuckle, then turns west onto Freeway Underpass Road to exit 567, while Fifth Street continues north as Frontage Road (CR 99W). Both interchanges are signed for "Frontage Road".

Major intersections

The entire route is in Arbuckle, Colusa County.

mi	km	Destinations	Notes
		Hillgate Road	Continuation beyond I-5
		I-5 south – Sacramento	Interchange; southern terminus; no access to I-5 north; I-5 exit 566
		College City (Road 99W)	Former US 99W south
		Frontage Road	Former US 99W north
		I-5 – Redding, Sacramento	Interchange; northern terminus; I-5 exit 567
1.000 mi = 1.609 km; 1.000 km = 0.621 mi: Incomplete access

=== Williams–Maxwell business loop ===
Interstate 5 Business
- Location: Williams–Maxwell

Interstate 5 Business (I-5 Bus.) in Williams begins at I-5 exit 575, runs north on Husted Road, and then northwest onto Frontage Road and Old Highway 99W, which runs along the west side of a former Southern Pacific (SP) line, now part of Union Pacific Railroad (UP). Within downtown Williams, the route takes a reverse curve away from the tracks into Seventh Street where it intersects SR 20 Bus. but then returns to its previous trajectory before running under a bridge for SR 20, which has one connecting road between the two routes on the northwest corner. North of Williams, the route passes through the unincorporated community of Cortena, where it shifts from northwest to north. Entering Maxwell the road makes another slight shift away from the former SP line, but not as far away as in downtown Williams. It intersects Oak Street and Maxwell-Colusa Road (the main west–east road in Maxwell), and then shifts back to its previous trajectory at a mobile home park north of North Street. I-5 Bus. continues along the west side of the tracks until ending at a half diamond interchange with I-5 with only southbound offramp and northbound onramp at exit 588. Old Highway 99W simply continues northward as County Road 99W.

Major intersections

The entire route is in Colusa County.

Location	mi	km	Destinations	Notes
Williams			Husted Road south	Continuation beyond I-5
Williams			I-5 – Redding, Sacramento	Interchange; southern terminus; I-5 exit 575
Williams			Husted Road north, Frontage Road south	Frontage Road south is former US 99W south
Williams			SR 20 Bus. (E Street)	Former SR 20
Williams			SR 20 to I-5	Interchange via connector road
Maxwell			Oak Street, Maxwell Road – Sites, Lodoga, Stonyford	Connects to I-5 south
			I-5 north – Redding	Interchange; northern terminus; no access to I-5 south; I-5 south accessible via Maxwell Road; I-5 south exit 588
			Road 99W	Continuation beyond I-5; former US 99W north
1.000 mi = 1.609 km; 1.000 km = 0.621 mi: Incomplete access

=== Willows–Orland business loop ===
Interstate 5 Business
- Location: Willows–Orland
- Length: 20.7 mi (33.3 km)

Interstate 5 Business (I-5 Bus.) is one of the longer business loops at 20.7 miles (33.3 km) that runs between Willows and Orland, though most of the signage is as Historic Highway 99W. The route begins at exit 601 on CR 57 and turns east. The segment is merely 400 feet (120 m) from the northbound onramp before turning north onto Old Highway 99W, running along the west side of the same UP line mentioned in Williams and Maxwell. The route follows the historic U.S. Route past a bridge over a canal where it becomes South Tehama Street, and then North Tehama Street at the intersection with West and East Sycamore Avenues. At the intersection of West and East Wood Street (Biggs-Willows Road) is SR 162, he first major intersection with the business route and the only one in Willows outside of its southern terminus. North of SR 162, the North Tehama Street name fades away as route makes a slight northeast curve where it crosses a railroad spur leading to a Johns Manville insulation plant and then curves back north again running closer to that UP line.

Leaving Willows, I-5 Bus. passes through farmland, interrupted briefly by communities like Bluegum, where it curves away from the tracks to run along Walker Creek, only to cross a bridge over that creek and resumes hugging the side of the tracks again. The next community is Artois, where it moves northwest further away from the old SP line than it was in Willows but still turns back north again. Continuing its journey through rural Glenn County, I-5 Bus. passes through Grapit, then crosses a bridge over another canal to enter Greenwood. The route begins moving closer through the tracks as it continues through rural land and returns to the tracks after CR 20. The road returns to more rural setting as it enters Orland where it becomes Sixth Street and edges away from the tracks for local buildings on the east side. The intersection of Newville Road and Walker Street is where I-5 Bus. encounters SR 32. Two blocks later, the road hugs the side of the tracks again, and the road runs under an arch at a short bridge over the Stony Creek Irrigation Canal immediately south of the intersection with Almond Way. The tracks curve to the northeast away from the route just before the bridge over Hambright Creek where the road enters Wyo and then runs over a longer bridge over Stony Creek. After passing CR 9 then CR 8 on the east side, the business route turns left onto CR 7, while the former US 99W continues northward as "Highway 99W". Approximately 0.4 miles (0.64 km) west of there, I-5 Bus. ends at exit 621 on I-5.

Major intersections

The entire route is in Glenn County.

Location	mi	km	Destinations	Notes
			Road 57 west	Continuation beyond I-5
			I-5 – Redding, Sacramento	Interchange; southern terminus; I-5 exit 601
Willows			Road 57 east, Road 99W south	Road 99W south is former US 99W south
Willows			SR 162 (East Wood Street, West Wood Street)	
Bluegum			Road 39	Connects to I-5
Artois			Road 33	Connects to I-5
Orland			South Street	
Orland			SR 32 (Walker Street, Newville Road) to I-5	
			Highway 99W north	Former US 99W north
			I-5 – Redding, Sacramento	Interchange; northern terminus; I-5 exit 621
			Road 7 west	Continuation beyond I-5
1.000 mi = 1.609 km; 1.000 km = 0.621 mi

=== Red Bluff business loop ===
Interstate 5 Business
- Location: Red Bluff
- Length: 4.2 mi (6.8 km)

Interstate 5 Business (I-5 Bus.) in Red Bluff, at 4.2 miles (6.8 km), has historically been part of both US 99 as well as US 99 Bus. It begins on I-5 at exit 647 (exit 647A southbound). The route runs along South Main Street (CR A8), on the west side of an old UP line until after the intersection with the driveway to Red Bluff Shopping Center where it curves to the northeast and crosses under a trestle for that line. The route maintains that northeastern trajectory until just before it crosses a bridge over Reeds Creek, where the name changes to Main Street.

At Oak Street and Antelope Boulevard, I-5 Bus. is joined by an overlap with SR 36. Two blocks north of there, northbound I-5 Bus. and westbound SR 36 has an intersection with Walnut Street (CR A7) the road that leads to Shasta College. Less than three blocks later, the backyard of businesses along the east side is a bend in the Sacramento River, and I-5 Bus. and SR 36 curve to the northeast just north of that bend at Dog Island Park. The routes run parallel to the former SP line again, but this time on the west side before approaching the intersection with Adobe Road. The northern terminus of SR 36 ends where that route heads west toward Fortuna, just before the bridge over Dibble Creek. The last intersection with both directions of I-5 Bus. is with Hess Road just before the route approaches the flyover interchange with I-5 at exit 651, which contains a southbound offramp and northbound onramp. The last intersection for northbound I-5 Bus. is with Via Del Roble just before the aforementioned onramp with I-5.

Major intersections

The entire route is in Red Bluff, Tehama County.

mi	km	Destinations	Notes
		Road 99W (CR A8 south)	Continuation beyond I-5; former US 99W south
		I-5 – Sacramento, San Francisco, Redding	Interchange; southern terminus; south end of CR A8 overlap; I-5 north exit 647, south exit 647A
		Luther Road	Serves Red Bluff Municipal Airport
		SR 36 east (Antelope Boulevard) / Oak Street	South end of SR 36 overlap; north end of CR A8 overlap; northern terminus of CR A8; former US 99E south
		CR A7 (Walnut Street)	Eastern terminus of CR A7
		Adobe Road to I-5	
		SR 36 west – Fortuna	North end of SR 36 overlap
		I-5 north – Redding	Interchange; northern terminus; no access to I-5 south; I-5 south exit 651; former US 99 north
1.000 mi = 1.609 km; 1.000 km = 0.621 mi: Concurrency terminus; Incomplete access

=== Dunsmuir business loop ===
Interstate 5 Business
- Location: Dunsmuir
- Length: 3.7 mi (6.0 km)

Interstate 5 Business (I-5 Bus.) is a 3.7-mile (6.0 km) business route of I-5 in Dunsmuir. I-5 Bus. followed the original routing of US 99 along Dunsmuir Avenue at exits 729 and 732, but it also has an additional interchange at exit 730, where it switches over from the east side of I-5 to the west side.

Route description

I-5 Bus. begins at a trumpet interchange at Dunsmuir Avenue. The first sites along the road are a gas station and convenience store, two motels, and a self-storage facility. The route winds through the mountains of the southern outskirts of the city, passing by the Dunsmuir Lodge motel. Between the intersection with Katherine and Hill streets, it runs alongside the Dunsmuir Cemetery, officially entering the city limits halfway though. The route runs between Dunsmuir City Hall on the west side and Siskiyou County Sheriffs Office just before entering the Dunsmuir Historic Commercial District between Cedar and Spruce streets.

Exit 730 is a partial diamond interchange on the northbound side where the off- and onramps do not connect to one another, and a southbound right-in/right-out interchange with a wide gap between the two ramps divided by the Sacramento River as well as Tauhindauli Park. North of the southbound offramp with exit 730, I-5 Bus. moves closer to the southbound lanes of I-5 and runs beneath the south end of Siskiyou Avenue which contains a bridge over both Dunsmuir Avenue and I-5. Near a local road named Scarlet Way, the road moves away from the interstate with mostly residential wooded surroundings. Across from the Castle Rock Water Company, Dunsmuir Avenue becomes Mott Road with a parking lot for the Hedge Creek Falls Scenic Area, while I-5 Bus. makes a right turn onto the north end of Siskiyou Avenue, and ends at a diamond interchange with I-5 at exit 732.

Major intersections

The entire route is in Siskiyou County.

Location	mi	km	Destinations	Notes
			I-5 – Weed, Redding	Interchange; southern terminus; I-5 exit 729; former US 99 south
Dunsmuir			I-5 – Portland, Redding	Interchange; I-5 exit 730
Dunsmuir			I-5 – Portland, Redding	Interchange; northern terminus; I-5 south exit 732; former US 99 north
Dunsmuir			Siskiyou Avenue	Continuation beyond I-5
1.000 mi = 1.609 km; 1.000 km = 0.621 mi

=== Mount Shasta business loop ===
Interstate 5 Business
- Location: Mount Shasta
- Length: 3.8 mi (6.1 km)

Interstate 5 Business (I-5 Bus.) is a 3.8-mile (6.1 km) business route of I-5 in the city of Mount Shasta. I-5 Bus. followed the original routing of US 99 along South Mount Shasta Boulevard at exit 737 (mixed with SR 89 at exit 736) and North Mount Shasta Boulevard at exit 740. Many of the businesses along the route are Alpine and Scandinavian mountain-themed motels.

Route description

I-5 Bus. begins at exit 737 which has connecting ramps to and from exit 736 (SR 89). The first intersection along the road is with South Mount Shasta Boulevard, a frontage road connecting to SR 89, which also connects southbound drivers to northbound I-5 via SR 89. North of that intersection the street name for the business route is South Mount Shasta Boulevard, with remnants of the old road on the northeast corner of that intersection. The road starts out as a two-lane forest road, though sparse development begins to show up after the intersection with Church Street where the road turns straight north. At the Evergreen Lodge, the route curves to the northwest, where development can now be found on both sides. Though primarily consisting of commercial development including motels and restaurants, a few residences can also be seen along the road. The northwest trajectory continue through the intersection with Old McCloud Road then turns straight north at Ream Avenue replacing the trajectory for that street.

At a blinker light intersection with Mount Cloud Avenue and Chestnut Street, South Mount Shasta becomes North Mount Shasta and bends to the northwest again. The first intersection after this blinker light is West Lake Street (at City Hall) and East Lake Street, the former of which is CR A10, a route that joins I-5 Bus. for two blocks. The overlap ends at East Alma Street, and CR A10 makes a right turn. It is here that the road runs parallel along the east side of a former SP line, now part of UP, although it briefly moves away from the tracks between East Ivy Street and north of East Hinckley Street with the north end of Chestnut Street in between. Shortly after returning to the side of the tracks it encounters a railroad crossing of a spur leading to the south side of the mountain almost to McCloud. Shortly after passing by some industrial zoning, the remnant of an even older section of US 99 can be found at Ski Village Drive. After making a sharp curve to the west, the old section of US 99 is spotted again as Road Number 2M16, albeit cut off from I-5 Bus. as a dead-end street. The last intersection along the route is with Spring Hill Road, before I-5 Bus. finally terminates at northbound I-5, while southbound I-5 Bus. begins at a flyover interchange from exit 740.

Major intersections

The entire route is in Siskiyou County.

Location	mi	km	Destinations	Notes
	0.0	0.0	I-5 south / SR 89 south – Redding, McCloud	Interchange; southern terminus; no access to I-5 north; I-5 north exit 737; I-5 is former US 99 south
Mount Shasta	1.9	3.1	Lake Street (CR A10 west) to I-5	South end of CR A10 overlap
Mount Shasta	2	3.2	Alma Street (CR A10 east)	North end of CR A10 overlap
Mount Shasta	3.8	6.1	I-5 north – Weed, Portland	Interchange; northern terminus; no access to I-5 south; I-5 south exit 740; former US 99 north
1.000 mi = 1.609 km; 1.000 km = 0.621 mi: Concurrency terminus; Incomplete access

=== Weed business loop ===
Interstate 5 Business
- Location: Weed

Interstate 5 Business (I-5 Bus.) runs along Weed Boulevard in Weed. Its southern terminus is at I-5 at exit 745. It then overlaps the southernmost segment of US 97 before overlapping SR 265 between US 97 and I-5 at exit 748.

Major intersections

The entire route is in Weed, Siskiyou County.

mi	km	Destinations	Notes
		Vista Drive	Continuation beyond I-5
		I-5 – Redding, Portland	Interchange; southern terminus; I-5 exit 745; former US 99 south
		I-5 / College Avenue – Redding, Portland	Interchange; south end of US 97 overlap; southern terminus of US 97; I-5 exit 747; College Avenue serves College of the Siskiyous
		Main Street	
		US 97 north – Klamath Falls, Bend	North end of US 97 overlap; south end of SR 265 overlap; southern terminus of SR 265
		I-5 / Edgewood Road – Portland, Redding	Interchange; northern terminus; north end of SR 265 overlap; I-5 exit 748; former US 99 north
		Chaparral Drive	Continuation beyond I-5; dead end
1.000 mi = 1.609 km; 1.000 km = 0.621 mi: Concurrency terminus

=== Yreka business loop ===
Interstate 5 Business
- Location: Yreka
- Length: 3.8 mi (6.1 km)

Interstate 5 Business (I-5 Bus.) in Yreka, at 3.8 miles (6.1 km), begins on I-5 at exit 773. It then overlaps with SR 3 along Main Street, another part of former US 99. I-5 Bus./SR 3 then turns east onto Montague Road to intersect with I-5 at its exit 776. I-5 Bus. terminates at I-5 while SR 3 continues onto Montague.

The entire route is in Yreka, Siskiyou County.

mi	km	Destinations	Notes
		Moonlit Oaks Avenue east to Fairlane Road	Continuation beyond I-5; former US 99 south
		I-5 – Portland, Redding	Interchange; southern terminus; I-5 exit 773
		SR 3 south (South Main Street) / Moonlit Oaks Avenue west – Fort Jones, Etna	South end of SR 3 overlap
		Oberlin Road	
		Center Street to I-5	
		Miner Street	One way westbound
		SR 263 north (North Main Street) / Tebbe Street	Southern terminus of SR 263; former US 99 north
		I-5 – Redding, Portland	Interchange; northern terminus; north end of SR 3 overlap; I-5 exit 776
		SR 3 north (Montague Road) – Montague	Continuation beyond I-5
1.000 mi = 1.609 km; 1.000 km = 0.621 mi: Concurrency terminus; Incomplete access

== Oregon ==
Although Oregon has no official business routes of I-5, OR 99 essentially serves as a de facto one, running along a former routing of US 99.

== Washington ==
=== Vancouver business loop ===
Interstate 5 Business
- Location: Vancouver

Interstate 5 Business (I-5 Bus.) was a business route of I-5 in Vancouver.

=== Castle Rock business loop ===
Interstate 5 Business
- Location: Castle Rock

Interstate 5 Business (I-5 Bus.) is a business route of I-5 in Castle Rock. It is partially concurrent with State Route 411 (SR 411).

=== Chehalis–Centralia business loop ===
Interstate 5 Business
- Location: Chehalis–Centralia
- Existed: 1964–2018

Interstate 5 Business (I-5 Bus.) was a business route of I-5 from Chehalis to Centralia.

The route was originally composed of two partial loops connected by a center leg. Each loop served a city, with the northern loop serving Centralia and the southern loop serving Chehalis. These were posted following the elimination of the US 99 designation along most of the route in 1964. The business loop was removed in the 1970s; however, in 1989, the Chehalis City Council voted to restore the southern half of the route, composing the center leg and Chehalis loop. The Centralia City Council was also planning to take up the issue; however, it is unclear whether a vote was held and signs were not restored to the northern half of the route. However, the Chehalis part of the business loop had its signage restored in 1989. The signage was removed completely in 2018 when the interchange with I-5 was reconstructed.

=== Olympia ===
Interstate 5 Business
- Location: Olympia

=== Federal Way business loop ===
Interstate 5 Business
- Location: Fife–Midway
- Existed: 1962–1970

Interstate 5 Business (I-5 Bus.) was a section of former US 99 from Fife through Federal Way to Midway (near Des Moines) that was signed as a business loop in 1962. It is now part of SR 99.

=== Seattle ===
Interstate 5 Business
- Location: Seattle
- Existed: 2018–2024

Interstate 5 Business in Seattle was a temporary designation of the collector-distributor roads servicing Interstate 90's western terminal, as well as Dearborn, James, and Madison streets, in downtown Seattle during WSDOT's project to repair I-5 in 2018 so that motorists knew they could use that as a bypass around construction zones. When the project concluded in 2024, the designation was retired.
