= List of business routes of the Interstate Highway System =

Dwight D. Eisenhower National System of Interstate and Defense Highways
- Highway shields for Business Loop Interstate 24 and Business Spur Interstate 196

- Interstate Highways in the 48 contiguous states

System information
- Formed: June 29, 1956

Highway names
- Interstates: Interstate nn (I-nn)
- Business Loop: Business Loop Interstate nn (BL I-nn); Interstate nn Business Loop (I-nn Bus. or I-nn BL)
- Business Spur: Business Spur Interstate nn (BS I-nn); Interstate nn Business Spur (I-nn Bus. or I-nn BS)

System links
- Interstate Highway System; Main; Auxiliary; Suffixed; Business; Future

The Interstate Highway System of the United States, in addition to being a network of freeways, also includes a number of business routes assigned by the American Association of State Highway and Transportation Officials (AASHTO). These routes connect a central or commercial district of a city or town with an Interstate bypass.

As the main purpose of these routes are to serve a certain downtown area, business Interstates are typically routed along surface roads. These routes do not have to meet Interstate Highway standards and are not considered part of the Interstate Highway System. AASHTO does, however, apply similar standards as to new U.S. Highways, requiring a new business Interstate to meet certain design standards.

Business Interstates are more commonly found in the western regions of the United States, as well as both across the Great Plains and in the state of Michigan. In contrast, Eastern states generally did not designate as many business Interstates. This geographic difference can be attributed to the way the Interstate Highway System was constructed in different parts of the country. In many eastern states, the new Interstates were often built to parallel the existing U.S. Highway network, rather than directly replacing those older routes. With the exception of mountainous areas, this left the majority of U.S. Highways intact, or co-signed routes with the Interstates. However, in the western states, the construction of the Interstate system more frequently involved directly overlaying the former U.S. Highway alignments. This sometimes left sections of the old U.S. Highways disconnected, especially in rural areas between cities and towns. To maintain access to those former highway segments, business Interstate designations were often applied as a way to guide drivers to key commercial districts and services. Although business Interstates are primarily found along primary Interstates, a few auxiliary Interstates also have their own business route designations.

Like auxiliary Interstates, business Interstates can be repeated from state to state along their route. The only difference is that business Interstates can also be repeated in several locations within the same state.

Contents:	I-5; I-205; I-8; I-10; I-15; I-17; I-20; I-24; I-25; I-26; I-27; I-29; I-229; I-30; I-35; I-40; I-44; I-45; I-55; I-59; I-64; I-65; I-66; I-69; I-70; I-71; I-72; I-74; I-75; I-375; I-76(W); I-376; I-77; I-78; I-79; I-80; I-81; I-82; I-83; I-84(E); I-84(W); I-85; I-385; I-585; I-86; I-87; I-89; I-90; I-94; I-95; I-495; I-96; I-196; I-496; I-696

== Terminology and guidelines ==
As the main purpose of these routes is to serve a certain downtown or urban area, business Interstates are typically routed along surface roads rather than limited-access freeway segments. This allows the business route to directly connect to and navigate a local street network, providing more accessible connections to the central business district. Business Interstates are often designated along existing city streets or arterials that already have a strong commercial and retail presence, rather than cutting through the urban core on a new alignment.

Since business Interstates are primarily routed along surface roads, they do not have to meet the strict design standards required for the mainline Interstate Highway System in order to qualify for that kind of designation. However, despite sharing the "Interstate" designation and similar shield design, business Interstates are not actually considered part of the mainline Interstate Highway System. They are treated more as auxiliary or supplemental routes that complement the overall Interstate network, rather than being fully integrated components.

The design standards for business Interstates are more akin to the guidelines used for new U.S. Highway routes. While they aim to maintain a baseline of safety and continuity, the standards are less stringent than the exacting specifications for lane widths, access control, grade separations, and other factors that define the main Interstate Highway network.

=== Business route classifications ===
Business Interstates are signed with green shields that visually resemble the standard Interstate Highway shield, but with a few key differences. The word BUSINESS is used instead of INTERSTATE, and, above the number, where the state name is sometimes included, the word LOOP or SPUR appears.

A business loop has both ends connected to its parent Interstate route. This allows the business loop to provide direct access to the central business district or other major destinations within a city or town. Many business loops were created to replace a decommissioned U.S. Route. One example includes all the I-5 business loops in northern California, which replaced US 99W through towns like Woodland, Arbuckle, or Williams. Sometimes, a business loop may either be cosigned with or supplement an active U.S. Route, such as I-70 Business Loop in Denver, Colorado, that follows US 40 and Colfax Avenue across the metropolitan area.

A business spur has one end connected to the parent Interstate route, while the other end dangles or terminates at a specific destination, often the downtown or central business district of a city or town. One example is Business Spur I-75 into Bay City, Michigan. Sometimes, a business spur originates from an Interstate's terminus and continues into the city/destination. An example of this is I-20 Business Spur into Florence, South Carolina, which originates from I-20's eastern terminus at I-95.

While most business Interstates are usually routed along surface roads, they are sometimes routed onto freeways. Some of these stretches of freeways were once designated as mainline Interstates themselves, such as I-85 Business Loop in Spartanburg, South Carolina, and I-80 Business Loop in Sacramento, California.

== List ==
Defunct routes are listed in italics.

=== Interstate 5 ===
- I-5 Bus.—San Ysidro, National City and San Diego, California
- I-5 Bus.—San Diego, California
- I-5 Bus.—Solana Beach, California
- I-5 Bus.—San Clemente, California
- I-5 Bus.—Irvine, California
- I-5 Bus.—Los Angeles, California
- I-5 Bus.–Coalinga, California
- I-5 Bus.—Woodland, California
- I-5 Bus.—Arbuckle, California
- I-5 Bus.—Williams and Maxwell, California
- I-5 Bus.—Willows and Orland, California
- I-5 Bus.—Red Bluff, California
- I-5 Bus.—Cottonwood, California
- I-5 Bus.—Anderson and Redding, California
- I-5 Bus.—Dunsmuir, California
- I-5 Bus.—Mount Shasta, California
- I-5 Bus.—Weed, California
- I-5 Bus.—Yreka, California
- I-5 Bus.—Vancouver, Washington
- I-5 Bus.—Castle Rock, Washington
- I-5 Bus.—Chehalis and Centralia, Washington
- I-5 Bus.—Olympia, Washington
- I-5 Bus.—Fife, Washington and Midway (near Des Moines, Washington)
- I-5 Bus.—Seattle, Washington
- I-5 Bus.—Marysville, Washington and Everett, Washington
- I-5 Bus.—Bellingham, Washington

=== Interstate 205 ===
- I-205 Bus.—Tracy, California

=== Interstate 8 ===
- I-8 Bus.—San Diego, California
- I-8 Bus.—El Cajon, California
- I-8 Bus.—Alpine, California
- I-8 Bus.—El Centro, California
- State Bus. Route 8 (1)—Winterhaven, California and Yuma, Arizona
- State Bus. Route 8 (3)—Gila Bend, Arizona

=== Interstate 10 ===
- I-10 Bus.—Ontario, California
- I-10 Bus.—Colton, California
- I-10 Bus.—Indio, California
- I-10 Bus.—Blythe, California
- State Bus. Route 10 (1)—Quartzsite, Arizona
- State Bus. Route 10—Phoenix, Arizona
- State Bus. Route 10—Casa Grande, Arizona
- State Bus. Route 10 (2)—Tucson, Arizona
- State Bus. Route 10 (3)—Benson, Arizona
- State Bus. Route 10 Spur—Benson, Arizona
- State Bus. Route 10 (4)—Willcox, Arizona
- State Bus. Route 10 (5)—Bowie, Arizona
- State Bus. Route 10 (6)—San Simon, Arizona
- BL 21—Lordsburg, New Mexico
- BL 22—Deming, New Mexico
- BL—Las Cruces, New Mexico
- Bus. I-10-C—Sierra Blanca, Texas
- Bus. I-10-D—Van Horn, Texas
- Bus. I-10-F—Balmorhea, Texas
- Bus. I-10-G—Fort Stockton, Texas

=== Interstate 15 ===
- I-15 Bus.—Escondido, California
- I-15 Bus.—Victorville, California
- I-15 Bus.—Barstow, California
- I-15 Bus.—Mesquite, Nevada
- I-15 Bus.- St. George, Utah
- I-15 Bus.—Cedar City, Utah
- I-15 Bus.—Parowan, Utah
- I-15 Bus.—Beaver, Utah
- I-15 Bus.—Fillmore, Utah
- I-15 Bus.—Holden, Utah
- I-15 Bus.—Nephi, Utah
- I-15 Bus.—Layton, Utah
- I-15 Bus.—Brigham City, Utah (co-signed with I-84 Bus.)
- I-15 Bus.—Tremonton, Utah (partially concurrent with I-84 Bus.)
- I-15 Bus.—Pocatello, Idaho
- I-15 Bus.—Idaho Falls, Idaho
- I-15 Bus.—Butte, Montana (co-signed with I-90 Bus.)
- I-15 Bus.—Helena, Montana
- I-15 Bus.—Great Falls, Montana
- I-15 Bus.—Conrad, Montana
- I-15 Bus.—Shelby, Montana

=== Interstate 17 ===
- State Bus. Route 17—Black Canyon City, Arizona

=== Interstate 19 ===
- State Bus. Route 19 (1)—Nogales, Arizona
- State Bus. Route 19 (2)—Sahuarita, Arizona – Tucson, Arizona (Decommissioned in 2004; continued to be shown on Rand McNally road atlases until 2026.)

=== Interstate 20 ===
- Bus. I-20-B—Pecos, Barstow, Texas
- Bus. I-20-D—Monahans, Texas
- Bus. I-20-E—Odessa, Midland, Texas
- Bus. I-20-F—Stanton, Texas
- Bus. I-20-G—Big Spring, Texas
- Bus. I-20-H—Westbrook, Texas
- Bus. I-20-J—Colorado City, Texas
- Bus. I-20-K—Loraine, Texas
- Bus. I-20-L—Roscoe, Texas
- Bus. I-20-M—Sweetwater, Texas
- Bus. I-20-N—Trent, Texas
- Bus. I-20-P—Merkel, Texas
- Business I-20-Q—Tye, Texas
- Bus. I-20-R—Abilene, Texas
- Bus. I-20-T—Baird, Texas
- I-20 BS—Florence, South Carolina

=== Interstate 24 ===
- I-24 Bus.—Paducah, Kentucky
- Downtown Loop (Note: Downtown Loop I-24 in Paducah, Kentucky was changed to Business Loop I-24 in 2002.)—Paducah, Kentucky

=== Interstate 25 ===
- BL (11)—Williamsburg, New Mexico – Truth or Consequences, New Mexico
- BL (12)—Socorro, New Mexico
- BL (13)—Belen, New Mexico
- BL (14)—Santa Fe, New Mexico
- BL (15)—Las Vegas, New Mexico
- BL (16)—Springer, New Mexico
- BL (17)—Raton, New Mexico
- State Highway 25A—Trinidad, Colorado
- State Highway 25B Spur—Aguilar, Colorado
- State Highway 25C—Walsenburg, Colorado
- State Highway 25 Bus.—Colorado Springs, Colorado
- State Highway 25 Bus.—Castle Rock, Colorado (likely unsigned)
- I-25 Bus.—Cheyenne, Wyoming
- I-25 Bus.—Chugwater, Wyoming
- I-25 Bus.—Wheatland, Wyoming
- I-25 Bus.—Douglas, Wyoming
- I-25 Bus.—Glenrock, Wyoming
- I-25 Bus.—Casper, Wyoming
- I-25 Bus.—Buffalo, Wyoming

=== Interstate 126 ===
- I-126 BS—Columbia, South Carolina

=== Interstate 526 ===
- I-526 BS—Mount Pleasant, South Carolina

=== Interstate 27 ===
- Bus. I-27-T—Hale Center, Texas
- Bus. I-27-U—Plainview, Texas

=== Interstate 29 ===
- I-29 Bus.—Saint Joseph, Missouri
- I-29 Bus.—Elk Point, South Dakota
- I-29 Bus.—Brookings, South Dakota
- I-29 Downtown Spur—Sioux Falls, South Dakota
- I-29P Bus.—North Sioux City, South Dakota (unsigned)

=== Interstate 229 ===
- I-229 Downtown Loop—Sioux Falls, South Dakota

=== Interstate 30 ===
- I-30 Bus.—Benton, Arkansas
- I-30 Bus.—Little Rock, Arkansas

=== Interstate 35 ===
- BS I-35-A—Laredo, Texas
- Bus. I-35-B—Encinal, Texas
- Bus. I-35-C—Cotulla, Texas
- Bus. I-35-D—Dilley, Texas
- Bus. I-35-E—Pearsall, Texas
- Bus. I-35-H—New Braunfels, Texas
- Bus. I-35-J—Kyle, Texas
- Bus. I-35-L—Round Rock, Texas
- Bus. I-35-M—Georgetown, Texas (Cancelled July 2006)
- BS I-35-V—Alvarado, Texas
- Bus. I-35-X—Sanger, Texas
- I-35 BL—Ames, Iowa
- I-35 BL—Clear Lake, Iowa
- I-35 Bus.—Faribault, Minnesota
- I-35 Bus.—Albert Lea, Minnesota
- I-35 Bus.—Pine City, Minnesota

=== Interstate 40 ===
- I-40 Bus.—Needles, California
- State Bus. Route 40 (0)—Kingman, Arizona
- State Bus. Route 40 (1)—Seligman, Arizona
- State Bus. Route 40 (2)—Ash Fork, Arizona
- State Bus. Route 40 (3)—Williams, Arizona
- State Bus. Route 40 (4)—Flagstaff, Arizona
- State Bus. Route 40 (5)—Flagstaff, Arizona
- State Bus. Route 40 (6)—Winslow, Arizona
- State Route 40 Spur—Winslow, Arizona
- State Bus. Route 40 (7)—Joseph City, Arizona
- State Bus. Route 40 (8)—Holbrook, Arizona
- I-40 Bus.—Gallup, New Mexico
- I-40 Bus.—Grants, New Mexico
- I-40 Bus.—Albuquerque, New Mexico
- Bus. Route 40 (34)—Moriarty, New Mexico
- Bus. Route 40 (35)—Santa Rosa, New Mexico
- Bus. Route 40 (36)—Tucumcari, New Mexico
- Bus. I-40-A (Note: Business Loop I-40 for Glenrio, Texas is a spur route (at the New Mexico state line it becomes a country road), but is posted as a business loop.)—Glenrio, Texas
- Bus. I-40-B—Adrian, Texas
- Bus. I-40-C—Vega, Texas
- Bus. I-40-D—Amarillo, Texas
- Bus. I-40-F—Groom, Texas
- Bus. I-40-H—McLean, Texas
- Bus. I-40-J—Shamrock, Texas
- I-40 Bus.—Erick, Oklahoma
- I-40 Bus.—Sayre, Oklahoma
- I-40 Bus.—Elk City, Oklahoma
- I-40 Bus.—Clinton, Oklahoma
- I-40 Bus.—Weatherford, Oklahoma
- I-40 Bus.—El Reno, Oklahoma
- I-40 Bus.—Henryetta, Oklahoma
- I-40 Bus.—Sallisaw, Oklahoma
- I-40 Bus.—Winston-Salem and Greensboro, North Carolina (built as a freeway; Winston-Salem portion, alignment of the former I-40 since 1992, removed in February 2020; Greensboro portion, separated by a six-mile gap, removed September 2008)
- I-40 Bus.—Raleigh, North Carolina (unsigned; built as a freeway; replaced by Interstate 440)

=== Interstate 44 ===
- I-44 Bus.—Joplin, Missouri
- I-44 Bus.—Sarcoxie, Missouri
- I-44 Bus.—Mount Vernon, Missouri
- I-44 Bus.—Springfield, Missouri
- I-44 Bus.—Lebanon, Missouri
- I-44 Bus.—Waynesville–St. Robert, Missouri
- I-44 BS—Ft. Leonard Wood, Missouri
- I-44 Bus.—Rolla, Missouri
- I-44 Bus.—Pacific, Missouri

=== Interstate 45 ===
- Bus. I-45-F—Corsicana, Texas
- Bus. I-45-G—Ennis, Texas
- Bus. I-45-H—Palmer, Texas
- Bus. I-45-J—Ferris, Texas

=== Interstate 49 ===
- I-49 Bus.—Neosho, Missouri
- I-49 Bus.—Joplin, Missouri
- I-49 Bus.—Nevada, Missouri
- I-49 Bus.—Butler, Missouri

=== Interstate 55 ===
- I-55 Bus.—New Madrid, Missouri
- I-55 Bus.—Cape Girardeau-Fruitland, Missouri
- I-55 Bus.—Crystal City, Missouri
- I-55 Bus.—Springfield, Illinois
- I-55 Bus.—Lincoln, Illinois
- I-55 Bus.—Bloomington-Normal, Illinois

=== Interstate 65 ===
- I-65 Bus.—Lebanon, Indiana

=== Interstate 69 ===
- BL I-69—Charlotte, Michigan
- BL I-69—Coldwater, Michigan
- BL I-69—Lansing, Michigan
- BL I-69—Port Huron, Michigan

=== Interstate 70 ===
- I-70 Bus.—Richfield, Utah
- I-70 BS—Salina, Utah
- I-70 Bus.—Green River, Utah
- I-70 Bus.—Grand Junction, Colorado
- I-70 Bus.—Palisade, Colorado
- I-70 Bus.—Rifle, Colorado (unsigned)
- I-70 Bus.—Silt, Colorado (unsigned)
- I-70 Bus.—Eagle, Colorado (unsigned)
- I-70 Bus.—Edwards, Colorado (unsigned)
- I-70 Bus.—Avon, Colorado
- I-70 Bus.—Frisco, Colorado
- I-70 Bus.—Idaho Springs, Colorado
- I-70 Bus.—Denver, Colorado
- I-70 Bus.—Watkins, Colorado
- I-70 Bus.—Strasburg, Colorado (unsigned)
- I-70 Bus.—Deer Trail, Colorado (unsigned)
- I-70 Bus.—Agate, Colorado (unsigned)
- I-70 Bus.—Limon, Colorado
- I-70 Bus.—Vona, Colorado (unsigned)
- I-70 Bus.—Burlington, Colorado
- I-70 Bus.—Colby, Kansas
- I-70 Bus.—Oakley, Kansas
- I-70 Bus.—Hays, Kansas
- I-70 Bus.—Boonville, Missouri
- I-70 Bus.—Columbia, Missouri
- I-70 Bus.—St. Charles, Missouri
- I-70 Bus.—Springfield, Ohio

=== Interstate 72 ===
- I-72 Bus.—Jacksonville, Illinois

=== Interstate 75 ===
- BS I-75—Sault Ste. Marie, Michigan
- BL I-75—St. Ignace, Michigan
- BL I-75—Gaylord, Michigan
- BL I-75—Grayling, Michigan
- BL I-75—Roscommon, Michigan
- BL I-75—West Branch, Michigan
- BL I-75—Saginaw, Michigan
- BL I-75—Pontiac, Michigan
- BL I-75—Findlay, Ohio
- BL I-75—Sidney, Ohio
- BL I-75—Troy–Piqua, Ohio
- I-75 Bus.—Cordele, Georgia
- I-75 Bus.—Adel, Georgia
- I-75 Bus.—Tifton, Georgia
- I-75 Bus.—Valdosta, Georgia

=== Interstate 375 ===
- BS I-375—Detroit, Michigan (unsigned)

=== Interstate 76 (west) ===
- State Highway 76B—Keenesburg, Colorado (unsigned)
- I-76 Bus.—Fort Morgan, Colorado—Sterling, Colorado

=== Interstate 376 ===
- I-376 Bus.—Moon Township, Pennsylvania (created in 2009, replacing PA 60 Bus..)

=== Interstate 80 ===
- I-80 Bus.—Sacramento, California (freeway; alignment of the former I-80 since 1983; western segment unsigned since 2016)
- I-80 BS—Sacramento, California
- I-80 Bus.—Truckee, California
- I-80 Bus.—Lincoln, Nebraska
- I-80 Bus.—Sidney, Nebraska
- I-80 Bus.—Verdi, Nevada
- I-80 Bus.—Reno–Sparks, Nevada
- I-80 Bus.—Winnemucca, Nevada
- I-80 Bus.—Carlin, Nevada
- I-80 Bus.—Battle Mountain, Nevada
- I-80 Bus.—West Wendover, Nevada and Wendover, Utah
- I-80 Bus.—Evanston, Wyoming
- I-80 Bus.—Fort Bridger-Lyman, Wyoming
- I-80 Bus.—Green River, Wyoming
- I-80 Bus.—Rock Springs, Wyoming
- I-80 Bus.—Rawlins, Wyoming
- I-80 Bus.—Laramie, Wyoming
- I-80 Bus.—Cheyenne, Wyoming
- I-80 Bus.—Pine Bluffs, Wyoming

=== Interstate 81 ===
- I-81 Bus.—Syracuse, New York

=== Interstate 83 ===
- I-83 Bus.—York, Pennsylvania

=== Interstate 84 (east) ===
- I-84 Bus.—Newtown, Connecticut (now signed as part of US 6 and Route 25)

=== Interstate 84 (west) ===
- I-84 Bus.—Nampa and Caldwell, Idaho (Part of old US 30)
- I-84 Bus.—Mountain Home, Idaho
- I-84 Bus.—Hammett, Idaho
- I-84 Bus.—Glenns Ferry, Idaho
- I-84 Bus.—Bliss, Idaho (unsigned)
- I-84 Bus.—Jerome, Idaho (possibly being planned further)
- I-84 Bus.—Burley and Heyburn, Idaho
- I-84 Bus.—Tremonton, Utah (partially concurrent with I-15 Bus.)
- I-84 Bus.—Brigham City, Utah (co-signed with I-15 Bus.)

=== Interstate 85 ===
- I-85 Business—Greensboro, North Carolina (decommissioned in 2019; signage not fully eliminated until late 2023; continued to be shown on Rand McNally road atlases until 2026)
- I-85 Business—Spartanburg, South Carolina (alignment of the former I-85 since 1995; freeway)

=== Interstate 385 ===
- I-385 BS—Greenville, South Carolina (unsigned since 2007)

=== Interstate 585 ===
- I-585 BS—Spartanburg, South Carolina

=== Interstate 86 (west) ===
- I-86 Bus.—American Falls, Idaho

=== Interstate 89 ===
- I-89 BS—Lebanon, New Hampshire

=== Interstate 90 ===
- I-90 Bus.—Ellensburg, Washington
- I-90 Bus.—Moses Lake, Washington
- I-90 Bus.—Medical Lake, Washington
- I-90 Bus.—Spokane Valley, Washington
- I-90 Bus.—Wallace, Idaho
- I-90 Bus.—Missoula, Montana
- I-90 Bus.—Deer Lodge, Montana
- I-90 Bus.—Butte, Montana (co-signed with I-15 Bus.)
- I-90 Bus.—Billings, Montana
- I-90 Bus.—Sheridan, Wyoming
- I-90 Bus.—Buffalo, Wyoming
- I-90 Bus.—Gillette, Wyoming
- I-90 Bus.—Moorcroft, Wyoming
- I-90 Bus.—Sundance, Wyoming
- I-90 Bus.—Spearfish, South Dakota
- I-90 Bus.—Sturgis, South Dakota
- I-90 Bus.—Rapid City, South Dakota
- I-90 Bus.—Wall, South Dakota
- I-90 Bus.—Kadoka, South Dakota
- I-90 BS—Belvidere, South Dakota
- I-90 Bus.—Murdo, South Dakota
- I-90 Bus.—Vivian, South Dakota
- I-90 Bus.—Presho, South Dakota
- I-90 Bus.—Oacoma–Chamberlain, South Dakota
- I-90 BS—White Lake, South Dakota (unsigned)
- I-90 Bus.—Plankinton, South Dakota
- I-90 Bus.—Mitchell, South Dakota
- I-90 BS—Sioux Falls, South Dakota

=== Interstate 94 ===
- BL I-94—Benton Harbor–St. Joseph, Michigan
- BS I-94—Kalamazoo, Michigan
- BL I-94—Battle Creek, Michigan
- BL I-94—Marshall, Michigan
- BL I-94—Albion, Michigan
- BL I-94—Jackson, Michigan
- BL I-94—Ann Arbor, Michigan
- BL I-94—Port Huron, Michigan

=== Interstate 95 ===
- I-95 Bus.—Brunswick, Georgia
- I-95 Bus.—Darien, Georgia
- I-95 Bus.—Fayetteville, North Carolina
- I-95 Bus.—Wilson and Rocky Mount, North Carolina
- I-95 Bus.—Emporia, Virginia
- I-95 Bus.—Wilmington, Delaware (proposed around 2000, I-95 would have shifted to what is still I-495, but rejected by city's mayor—section was temporarily signed as I-895 in early 1980s.)
- I-95 Bus.- Mystic, Connecticut

=== Interstate 495 ===
- I-495 BS—Lowell, Massachusetts (built as a freeway)

=== Interstate 96 ===
- BS I-96—Muskegon, Michigan
- BS I-96—Portland, Michigan
- BL I-96—Lansing, Michigan
- BL I-96—Howell, Michigan
- BL I-96—Farmington, Michigan
- BS I-96—Detroit, Michigan

=== Interstate 196 ===
- BL I-196—South Haven, Michigan
- BL I-196—Holland, Michigan
- BS I-196—Wyoming, Michigan

=== Interstate 496 ===
- Capitol Loop—Lansing, Michigan

=== Interstate 696 ===
- BS I-696—Detroit, Michigan (built as a freeway)

== See also ==
- List of special routes of the United States Numbered Highway System
