= Sacramento National Wildlife Refuge =

Part of the United States system of National Wildlife Refuges

- IUCN category IV (habitat/species management area)
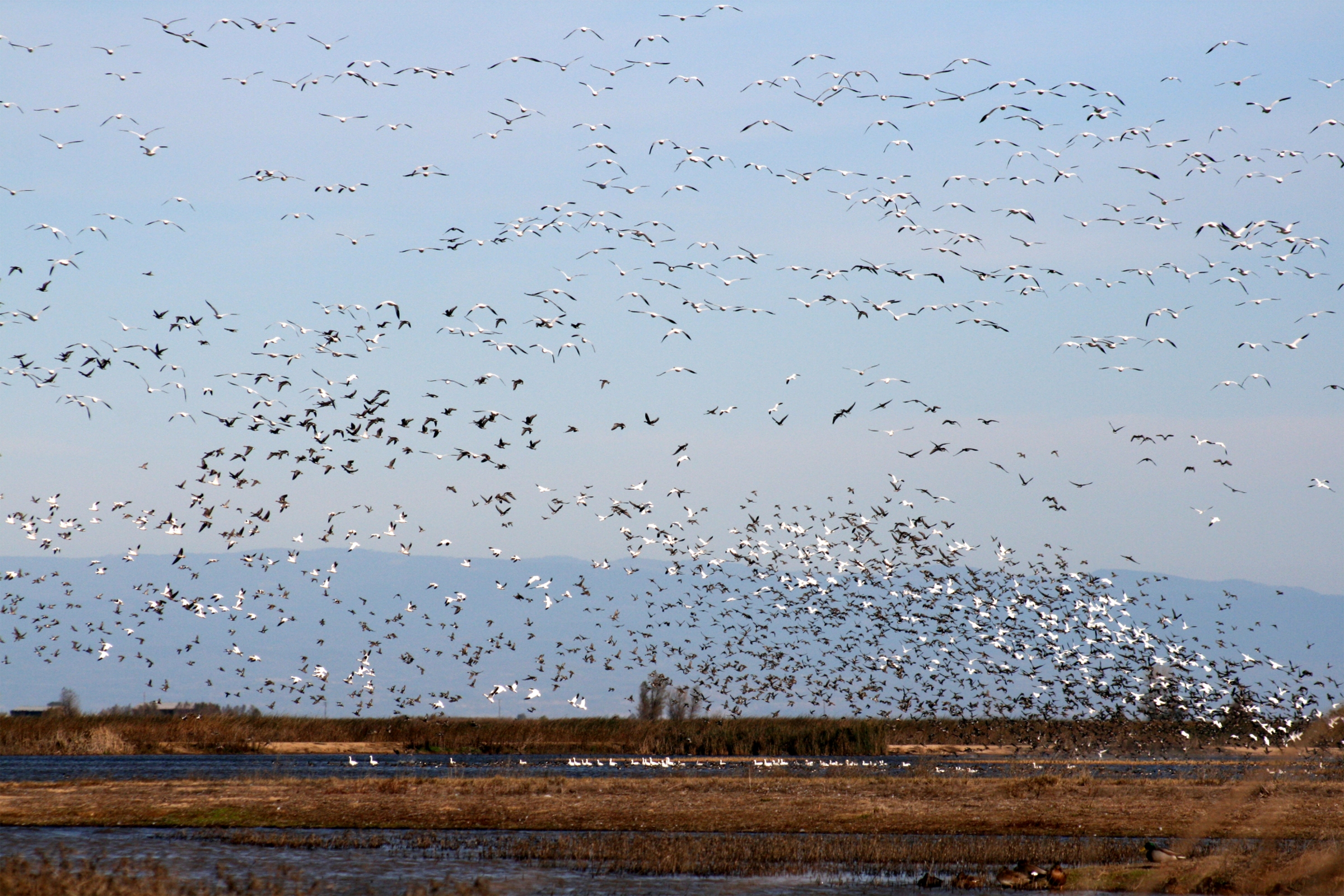
- Birds flying at Sacramento National Wildlife Refuge
- Interactive map of Sacramento National Wildlife Refuge
- Location: Glenn and Colusa Counties, California, United States
- Nearest city: Willows, California
- Coordinates: 39°25′48″N 122°11′10″W
- Area: 10,819 acres (43.78 km^{2})
- Established: 1937
- Governing body: U.S. Fish and Wildlife Service
- Website: Sacramento National Wildlife Refuge

The Sacramento National Wildlife Refuge Complex is part of the United States system of National Wildlife Refuges (NWR). It is located in northern California, in the valley of the Sacramento River.

The Sacramento NWR Complex was created in an attempt to resolve the conflict between the needs of migrating birds using the Pacific Flyway, and those of agriculture.

The Sacramento NWR Complex headquarters and visitor center is located in the 10,819-acre (4378 ha) Sacramento National Wildlife Refuge off 99W, and features a wildlife exhibit, bookstore, and Discovery Room. Visitors can enjoy a six-mile auto tour with 3 viewing areas and two walking trails.

== History and components ==
Before the arrival of European settlers in the 19th century, much of the Sacramento valley was taken up by seasonal wetlands and grasslands. By the beginning of the 20th century, much of this had been replaced by farmland, particularly for the growing of rice, and the rivers no longer create new wetlands because their flow is controlled by levees and irrigation schemes. Less than 10% of the original wetland area remains. Migrating birds have continued to use the area, and resting in the rice fields, consumed considerable quantities of the crop.

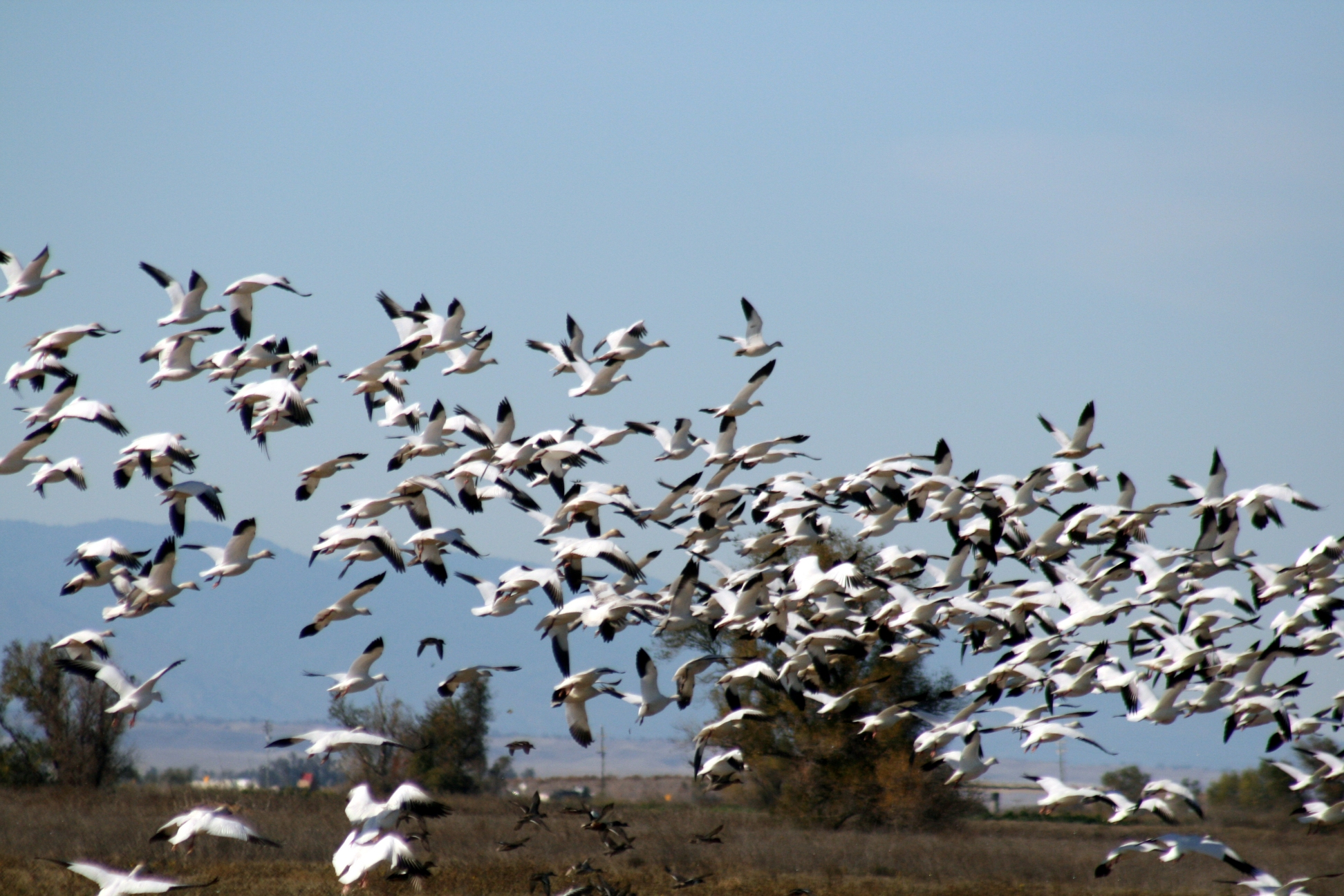
Snow geese

In 1937, the United States Fish and Wildlife Service, with the aid of the Civilian Conservation Corps, began the process of creating a refuge within dry, alkaline lands between the towns of Willows and Maxwell. This was the original Sacramento NWR. From the 1940s onward, additional refuges were created, so that the Sacramento NWR Complex now includes the following refuges, located between 80 and 145 kilometres (50 and 90 mi) north of the city of Sacramento:

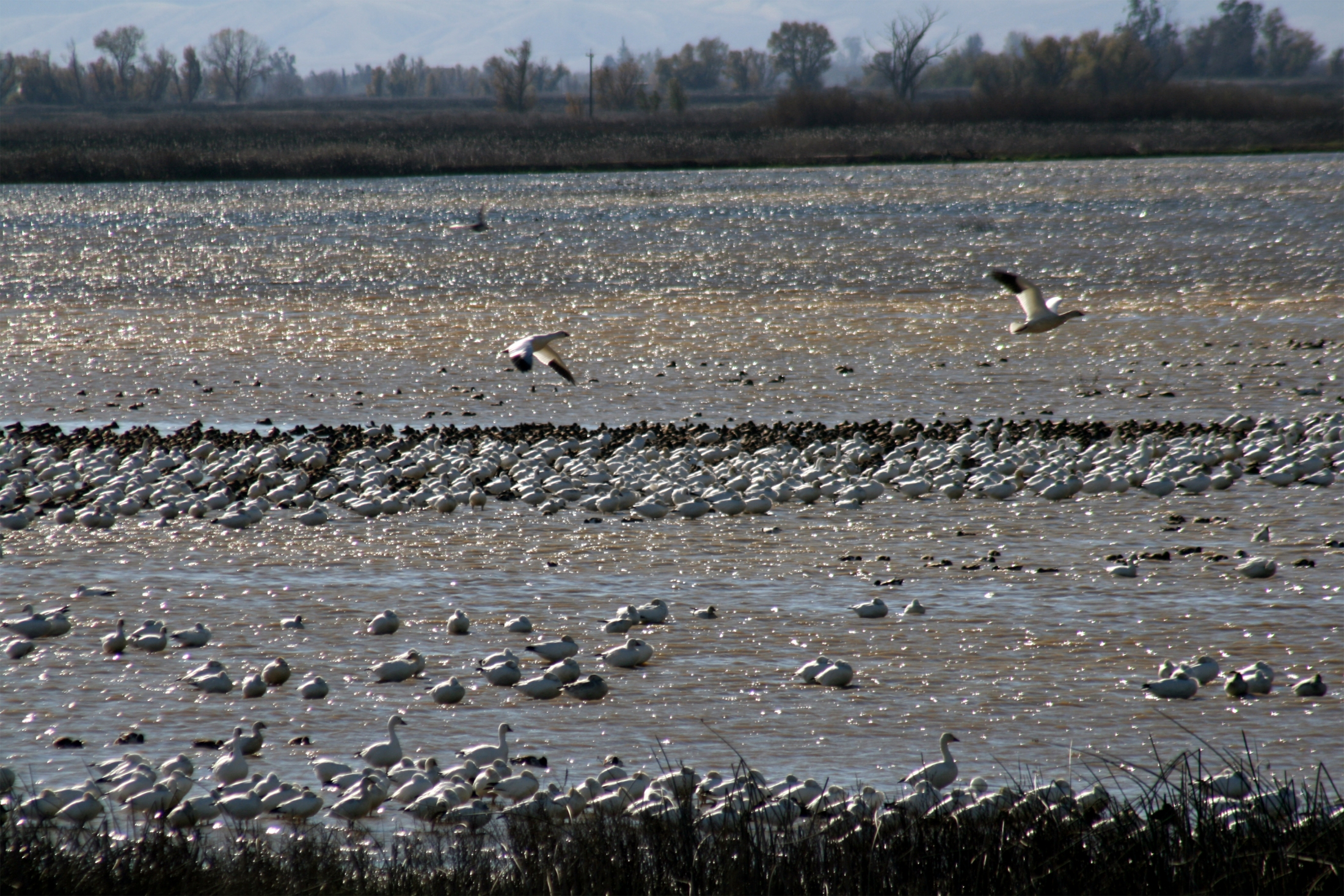
Snow geese at Sacramento National Wildlife Refuge

- Sacramento National Wildlife Refuge (southeastern Glenn and northeastern Colusa counties, south of Willows)
- Delevan National Wildlife Refuge (east of Maxwell)
- Colusa National Wildlife Refuge (between the towns of Colusa and Williams)
- Sutter National Wildlife Refuge (southwest of Yuba City)
- Sacramento River National Wildlife Refuge (several non-contiguous sites along the Sacramento River between Red Bluff and Colusa)
- Butte Sink Wildlife Management Area (northeast of the town of Colusa)
- North Central Valley Wildlife Management Area
- Willow Creek-Lurline Wildlife Management Area

The total area of the refuges is about 140 square kilometres (35,000 acres)s).

== Ecology ==
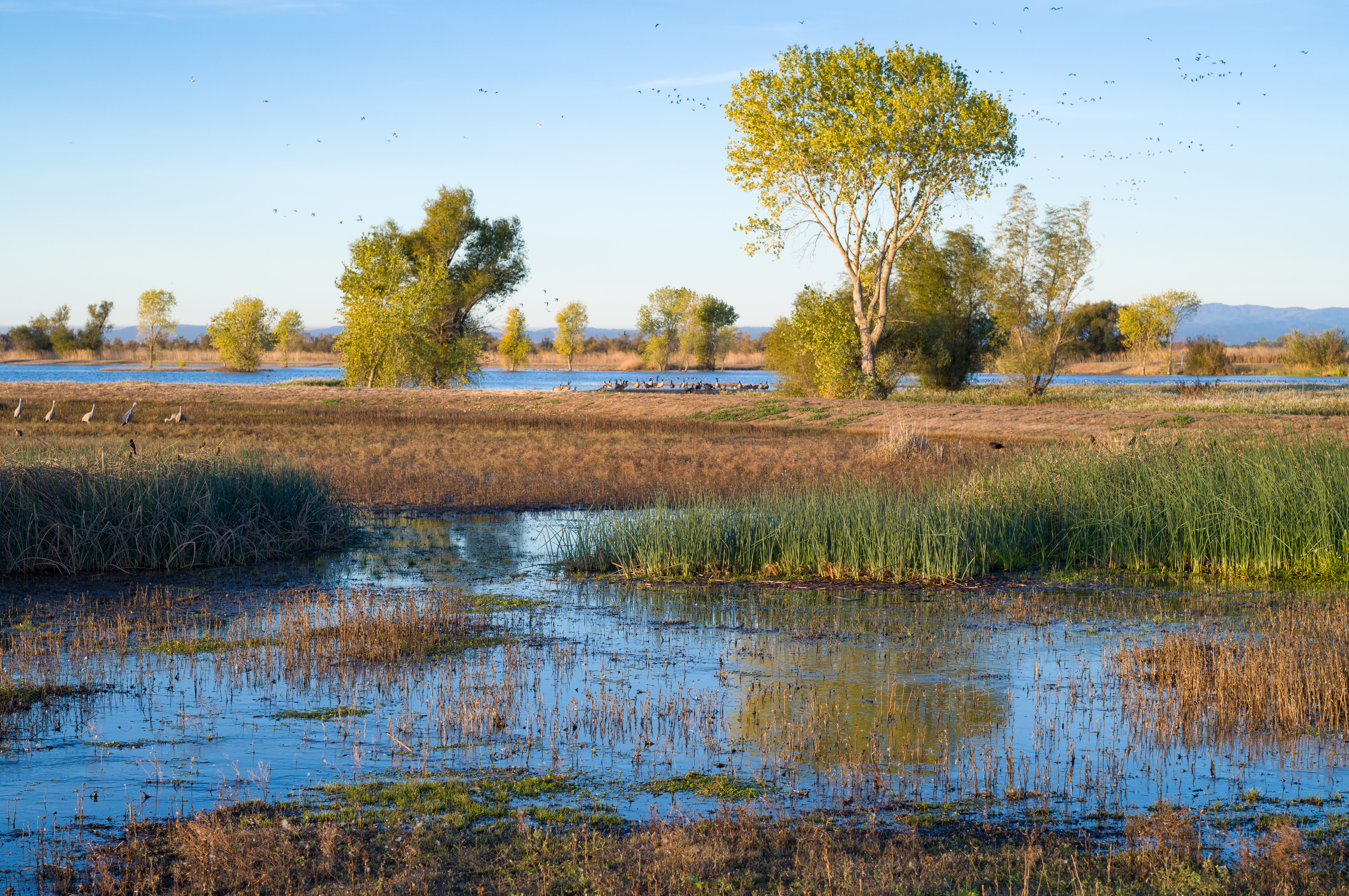
Wetlands at the Llano Seco Unit of the Sacramento National Wildlife Refuge Complex in October 2022

The water flows in the refuge have to be controlled artificially, and the vegetation has to be managed actively through irrigation and burning, to ensure that the wetlands remain productive, and provide adequate food and resting places for the birds. Between them, the refuges provide a range of habitats: seasonal marshes, uplands, permanent ponds, and riparian areas.

The refuges are provided with facilities for visitors, though these have to be limited to avoid conflict with their primary purpose of conservation. The layout of the wetlands has been planned to allow visitors a good view of the birds while minimising the risk of disturbance to them. There is a visitor center at the Sacramento NWR, and routes for car tours on the Sacramento and Colusa sites, though visitors are allowed to leave their cars only at selected sites. There are walking trails at both those sites and also at the Sacramento River site. Limited hunting is permitted on some of the sites.

Over 300 species of birds and mammals use the refuges, not all of them migratory. Among those most likely to be seen by visitors (depending on season) are:

- Grebes: pied-billed grebe, eared grebe
- Pelicans, cormorants: American white pelican, double-crested cormorant
- Herons etc.: American bittern, great blue heron, great egret, snowy egret, black-crowned night heron, white-faced ibis
- Ducks and geese: mallard, pintail, American wigeon, cinnamon teal, green-winged teal, bufflehead, northern shoveler, ring-necked duck, wood duck, snow goose, white-fronted goose, Ross's goose
- Raptors: turkey vulture, osprey, white-tailed kite, northern harrier, red-tailed hawk, American kestrel, golden eagle, bald eagle (the eagles are not common, but there is a chance of seeing them).
- Waders and other shorebirds: ring-necked pheasant, Virginia rail, sora, common moorhen, American coot, killdeer, black-necked stilt, American avocet, greater yellowlegs, western sandpiper, least sandpiper, dunlin, long-billed dowitcher, Wilson's snipe
- Gulls etc.: ring-billed gull, herring gull
- Pigeons and doves: mourning dove
- Owls: great horned owl, barn owl
- Woodpeckers: Nuttall's woodpecker, northern flicker
- Passerines: western kingbird, yellow-billed magpie, tree swallow, cliff swallow, barn swallow, marsh wren, ruby-crowned kinglet, European starling, American pipit, yellow-rumped warbler, common yellowthroat, Savannah sparrow, song sparrow, Lincoln's sparrow, white-crowned sparrow, golden-crowned sparrow, dark-eyed junco, red-winged blackbird, western meadowlark, Brewer's blackbird, brown-headed cowbird, Bullock's oriole, house finch, house sparrow
- Mammals: black-tailed jackrabbit, California ground squirrel, black-tailed deer.

The Sacramento National Wildlife Refuge Complex boasts a diverse flora, even though large amounts of the historic wetland has been destroyed. Among the diverse wildflowers present is the yellow mariposa lily, Calochortus luteus.
