= Butte Sink =

Depression in the Sacramento Valley, California, United States

- Depression
- Coordinates: 39°17′59″N 121°54′03″W
- Location: Butte, California, United States

Butte Sink is a depression in the Sacramento Valley, and within Butte County, California.

It is the location of the Butte Sink Wildlife Management Area and Butte Sink National Wildlife Refuge.
