= Delevan National Wildlife Refuge =

Protected natural area in California, United States

- IUCN category IV (habitat/species management area)
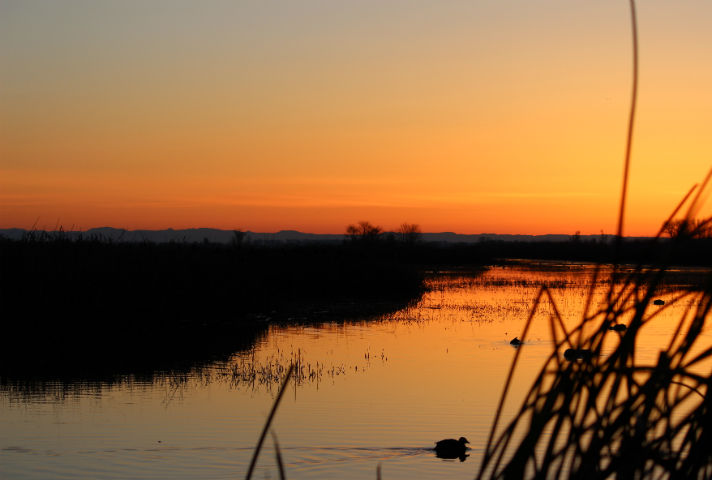

- Location within California
- Location: Colusa County, California, United States
- Nearest city: Colusa, California
- Coordinates: 39.31655°N 122.10108°W
- Area: 5,797 acres (23.46 km^{2})
- Established: 1962
- Governing body: U.S. Fish and Wildlife Service
- Website: Delevan National Wildlife Refuge

The Delevan National Wildlife Refuge is one of six refuges in the Sacramento National Wildlife Refuge Complex in the Sacramento Valley of central northern California.

== Geography ==
The 5,797-acre (23.46 km^{2}) refuge is located in Colusa County, California, approximately 80 miles (130 km) north of Sacramento.

The nature reserve consists of over 4,500 acres (18 km^{2}) of intensively managed wetlands and 1,200 acres (4.9 km^{2}) of uplands.

An estimated 1,000 visitors observe wildlife from a primitive roadside overlook along the Maxwell-Colusa Highway each year. Approximately 7,000 people hunt on the refuge each year.

== Natural history ==
More than 200,000 ducks and 100,000 geese come to the refuge each winter. With 95 percent of the wetlands of the Central Valley lost over the last 100 years, waterfowl have become increasingly dependent upon the refuges of the Sacramento Valley section.

The refuge supports several endangered plants and animals: giant garter snake, wintering peregrine falcon and bald eagle, breeding tricolored blackbird, and a large colony of the endangered palmate-bracted bird's beak (Cordylanthus palmatus) plant.

Resident wildlife include grebe, heron, blackbird, beaver, muskrat, black tailed deer and other species typical of upland and wetland habitats.
