= Butte Sink Wildlife Management Area =

Wetlands managed as part of the Sacramento National Wildlife Refuge Complex

- IUCN category IV (habitat/species management area)
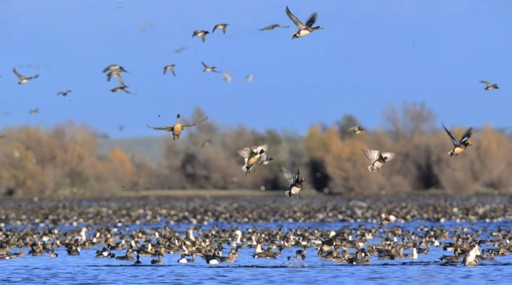
- Ducks at Butte Sink Wildlife Management Area

- Location within California Location within the United States
- Location: Colusa, Butte, and Sutter Counties, California United States
- Nearest city: Colusa, California
- Coordinates: 39.236998°N 121.941748°W
- Established: 1980
- Governing body: U.S. Fish and Wildlife Service
- Website: Butte Sink Wildlife Management Area

Butte Sink Wildlife Management Area is located in Colusa, Butte, and Sutter Counties. It is wetlands managed as part of the Sacramento National Wildlife Refuge Complex and is not open to the public.

Within the 18,000-acre (73 km^{2}) Wildlife Management Area (WMA), conservation easements have been purchased on 10,311 acres (41.73 km^{2}), requiring landowners to maintain wetlands on their property in perpetuity. These lands are privately owned and closed to public access. In addition, a 733-acre (2.97 km^{2}) area (owned in fee title) was established in 1980 to protect wetlands for wintering waterfowl. This area is known as the "Butte Sink Unit" (formerly known as the Butte Sink National Wildlife Refuge), and is also closed to public access.

Major refuge objectives are to provide feeding and resting habitat for wintering waterfowl; provide habitat and management for endangered, threatened, or sensitive species of concern; protect and provide habitat for neotropical migratory land birds; preserve a natural diversity and abundance of flora and fauna; and alleviate crop depredation.

The Butte Sink typically supports wintering populations of over 300,000 ducks and 100,000 geese. As 95 percent of wetlands of the Central Valley have been lost over the last 100 years, waterfowl have become increasingly dependent on the remaining wetlands within the Sacramento Valley.
