= Colusa National Wildlife Refuge =

Protected natural area in California, United States

- IUCN category IV (habitat/species management area)
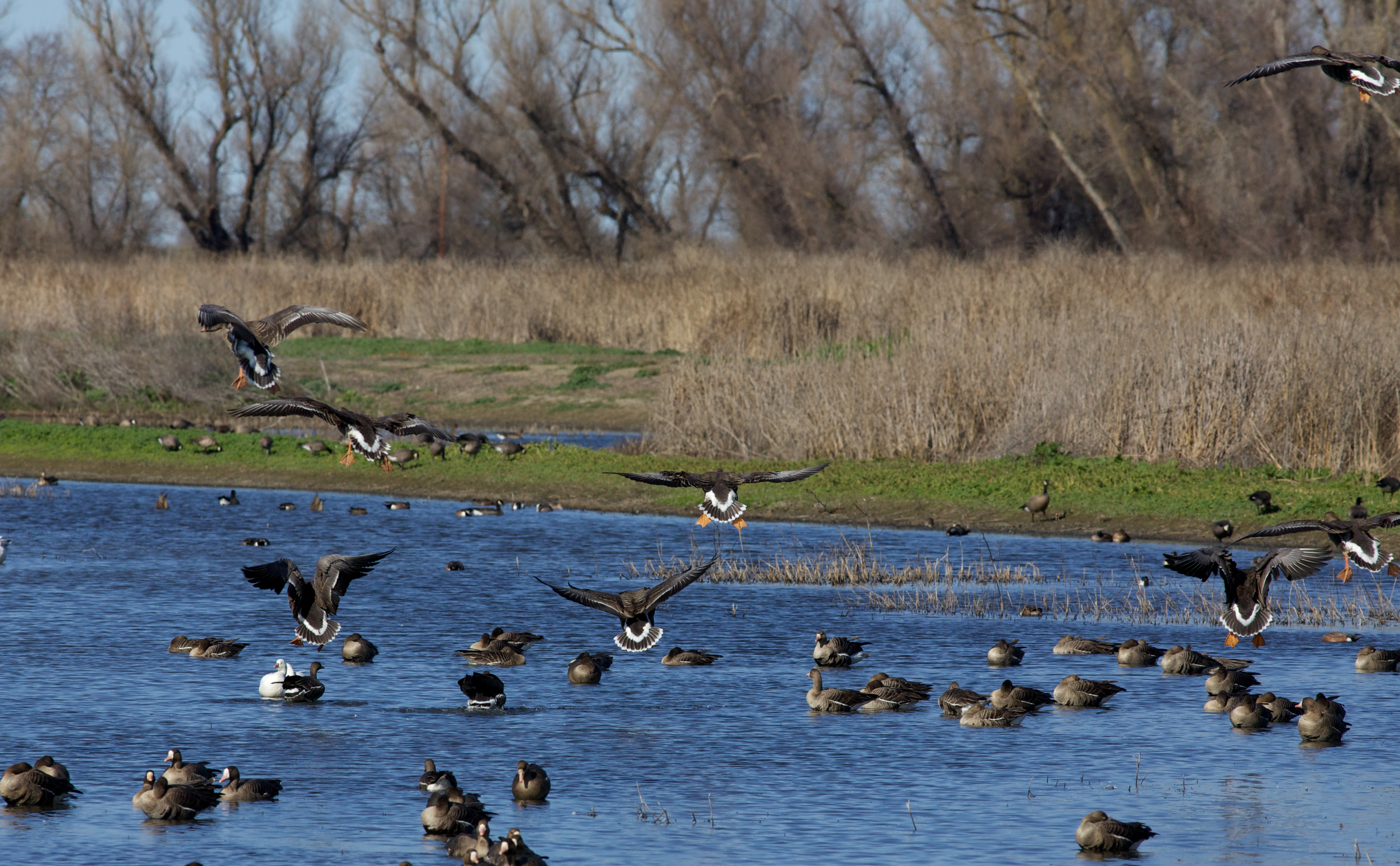

- Location within California Location within the United States
- Location: Colusa County, California, United States
- Nearest city: Colusa, California
- Coordinates: 39.15739°N 122.0433°W
- Area: 4,507 acres (18.24 km^{2})
- Established: 1945
- Governing body: U.S. Fish and Wildlife Service
- Website: Colusa National Wildlife Refuge

Colusa National Wildlife Refuge is one of six refuges in the Sacramento National Wildlife Refuge Complex located in the Sacramento Valley of north-central California. The refuge is located in Colusa County. It is around 70 miles (110 km) north of metropolitan Sacramento.

== Geography ==
The 4,507-acre (18.24 km^{2}) refuge primarily consists of intensively managed wetland impoundments, with some grassland and riparian habitats.

== Natural history ==
Colusa National Wildlife Refuge typically supports wintering populations of more than 200,000 ducks and 50,000 geese.

Wetland impoundments are intensively managed to provide optimal habitat for the dense concentration of wintering waterfowl, as well as habitat for resident wildlife and spring/summer migrants.

The grassland habitat supports several populations of endangered and sensitive species of plants. The refuge is a stronghold for populations of the endangered palmate-bracted bird's beak and the threatened giant garter snake. About 35,000 visitors come to the refuge each year for wildlife viewing and 4,000 come to hunt waterfowl and pheasant.

== Gallery ==
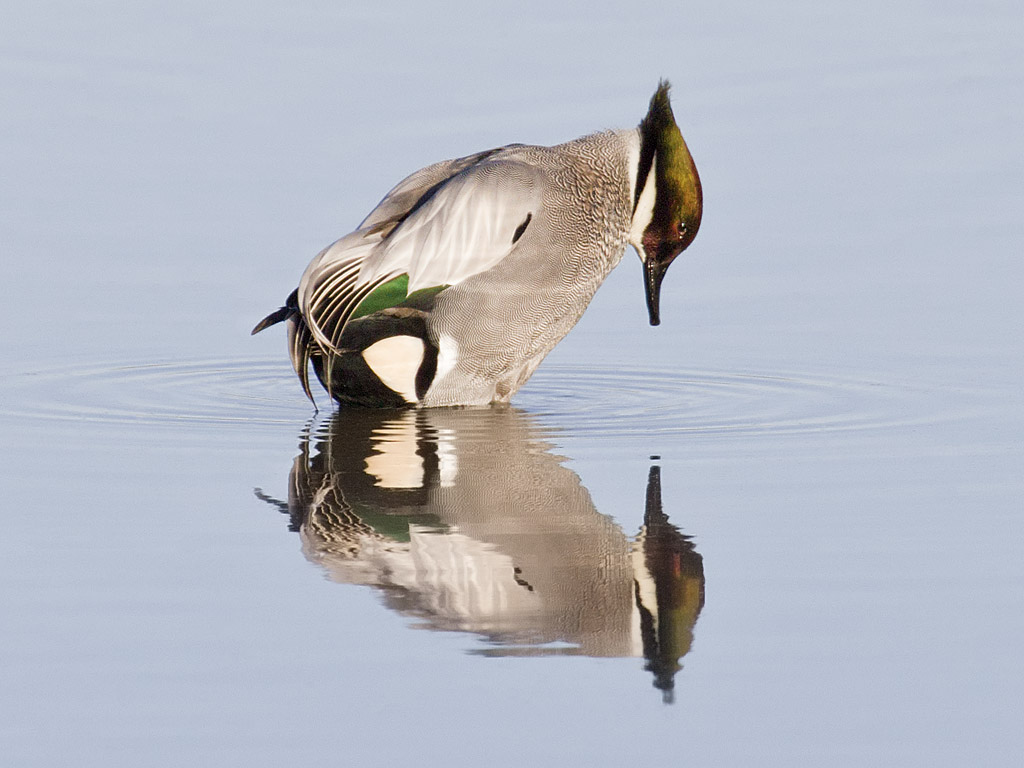
A rare falcated duck, a "vagrant" from Asia that arrived at Colusa National Wildlife Refuge (December 2011).
