= Stonyford, California =

Stonyford
- census-designated place
- Location in California
- Coordinates: 39°22′31″N 122°32′39″W
- Country: United States
- State: California
- County: Colusa

Area
  - Total: 1.404 sq mi (3.636 km^{2})
  - Land: 1.404 sq mi (3.636 km^{2})
  - Water: 0 sq mi (0 km^{2}) 0%
- Elevation: 1,184 ft (361 m)

Population (2020)
  - Total: 133
  - Density: 94.7/sq mi (36.6/km^{2})
- Time zone: UTC-8 (Pacific (PST))
  - Summer (DST): UTC-7 (PDT)
- ZIP Code: 95979
- Area codes: 530, 837
- FIPS code: 06-75154
- GNIS feature IDs: 1659881, 2583153

Stonyford (formerly, Stony Ford) is a census-designated place in Colusa County, California, United States. It lies at an elevation of 1184 feet (361 m). Its zip code is 95979 and its area code is 530. Stonyford's population was 133 at the 2020 census.

== Demographics ==
Historical population
Census	Pop.	Note	%±
2010	149		—
2020	133		−10.7%
U.S. Decennial Census; 2010

Stonyford first appeared as a census designated place in the 2010 U.S. census.

The 2020 United States census reported that Stonyford had a population of 133. The population density was 94.7 inhabitants per square mile (36.6/km^{2}). The racial makeup of Stonyford was 95 (71.4%) White, 10 (7.5%) African American, 5 (3.8%) Native American, 1 (0.8%) Asian, 1 (0.8%) Pacific Islander, 5 (3.8%) from other races, and 16 (12.0%) from two or more races. Hispanic or Latino of any race were 19 persons (14.3%).

The census reported that 121 people (91.0% of the population) lived in households, 12 (9.0%) lived in non-institutionalized group quarters, and no one was institutionalized.

There were 52 households, out of which 13 (25.0%) had children under the age of 18 living in them, 23 (44.2%) were married-couple households, 2 (3.8%) were cohabiting couple households, 20 (38.5%) had a female householder with no partner present, and 7 (13.5%) had a male householder with no partner present. 25 households (48.1%) were one person, and 18 (34.6%) were one person aged 65 or older. The average household size was 2.33. There were 25 families (48.1% of all households).

The age distribution was 26 people (19.5%) under the age of 18, 8 people (6.0%) aged 18 to 24, 20 people (15.0%) aged 25 to 44, 43 people (32.3%) aged 45 to 64, and 36 people (27.1%) who were 65 years of age or older. The median age was 58.1 years. There were 63 males and 70 females.

There were 86 housing units at an average density of 61.3 units per square mile (23.7 units/km^{2}), of which 52 (60.5%) were occupied. Of these, 40 (76.9%) were owner-occupied, and 12 (23.1%) were occupied by renters.

== Politics ==
In the state legislature, Stonyford is in the 1st senatorial district, represented by Republican Megan Dahle, and the 4th Assembly district, represented by Democrat Cecilia Aguiar-Curry. Federally, Stonyford is in California's 1st congressional district, represented by Republican James Gallagher.

== Climate ==
This region experiences hot and dry summers, with average monthly temperatures above 71.6 °F. According to the Köppen Climate Classification system, Stonyford has a warm-summer Mediterranean climate, abbreviated "Csb" on climate maps.

== Education ==
Stonyford is served by the Stony Creek Joint Unified School District.
