= Colusa County, California =

County in California, United States

Coordinates: 39.18°N 122.24°W

Colusa County
- County
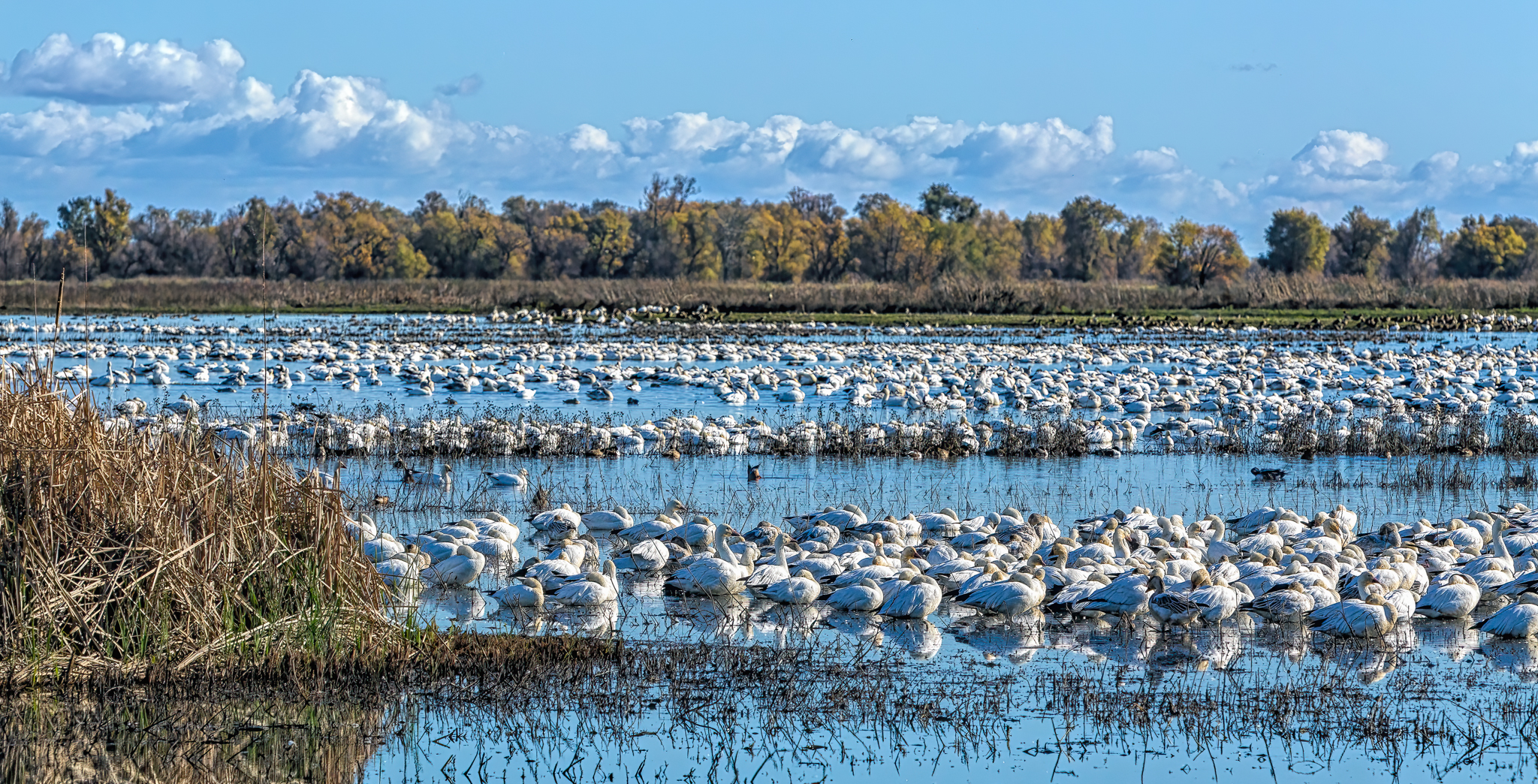
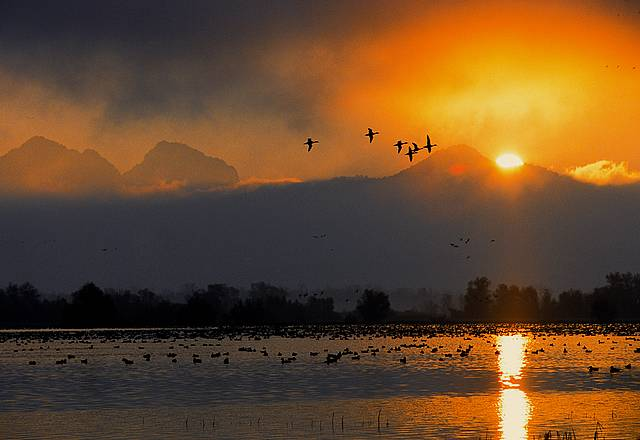
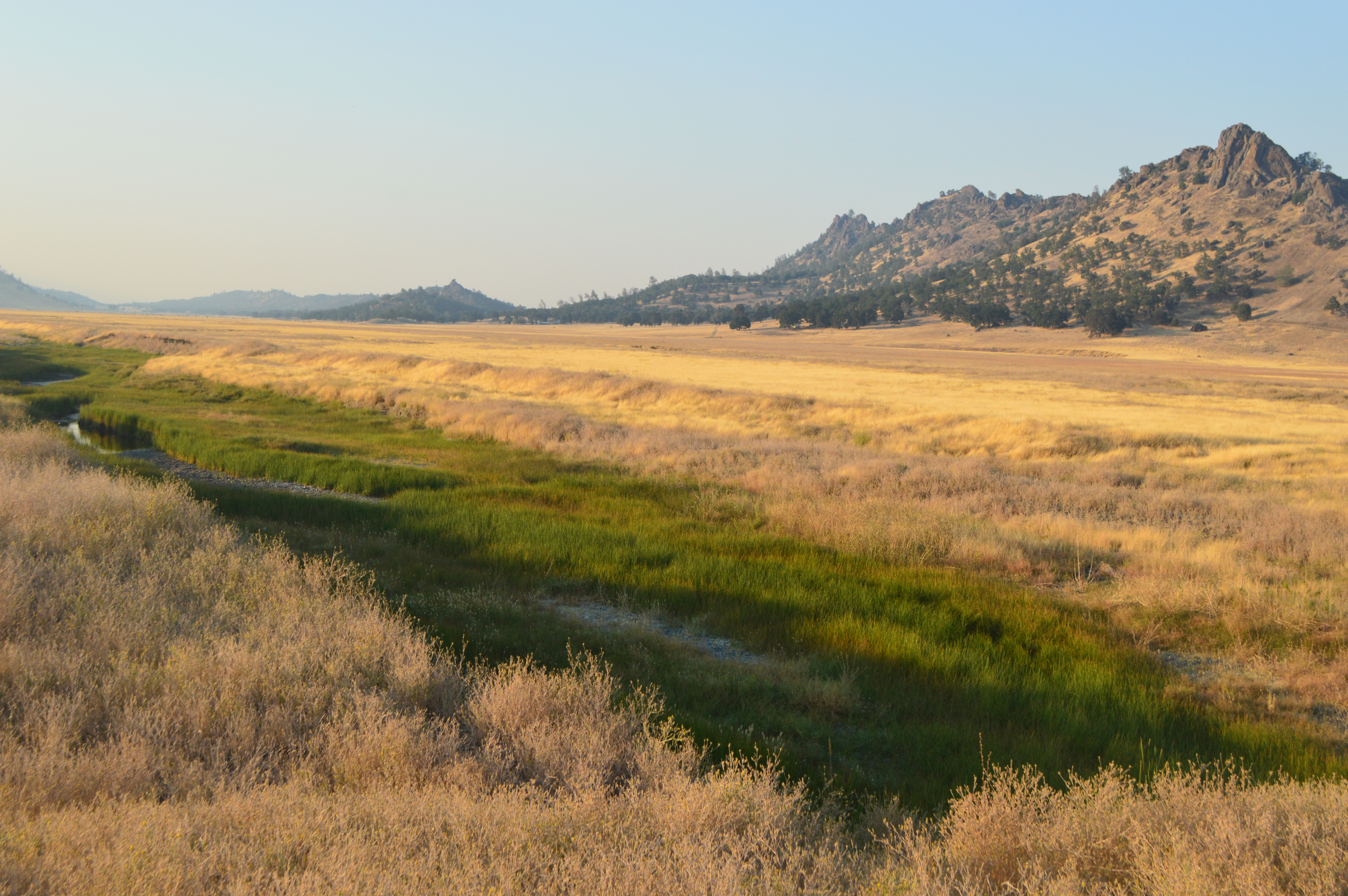
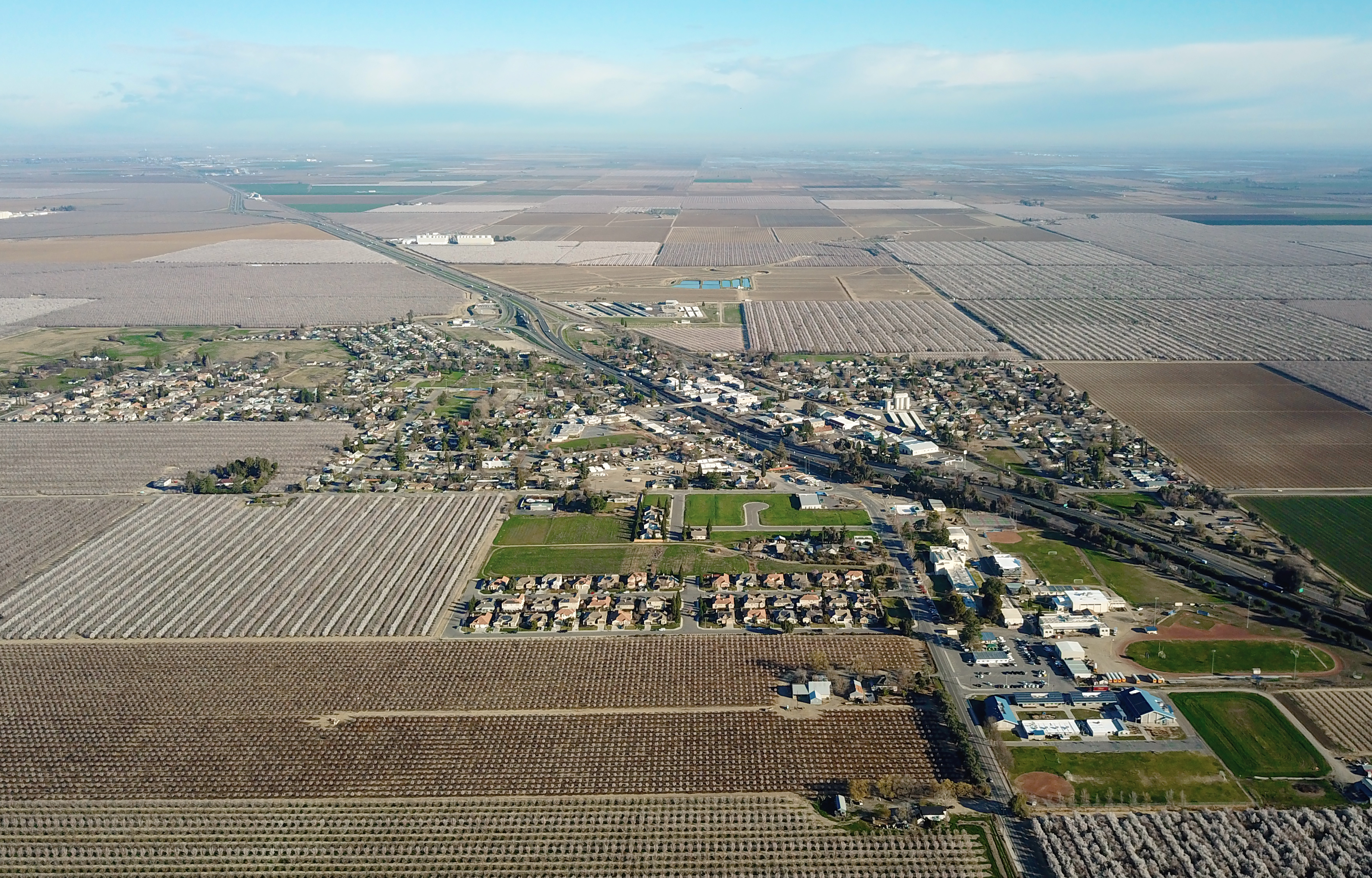
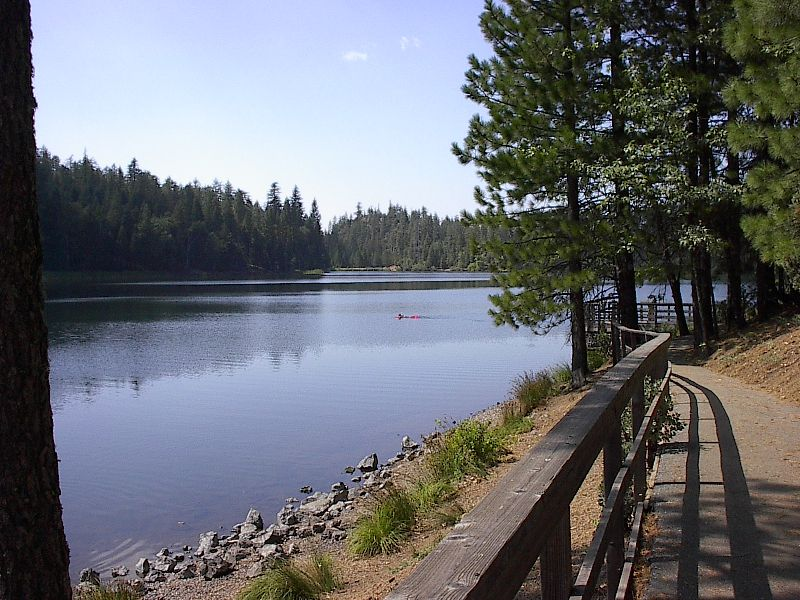
- Colusa National Wildlife Refuge Butte Sink Bear Valley Arbuckle Mendocino Forest

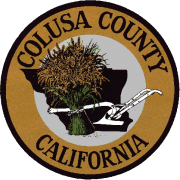
- Seal

- Location in the state of California
- Interactive map of Colusa County
- Country: United States
- State: California
- Region: Sacramento Valley
- Incorporated: February 18, 1850
- Named for: Rancho Colus
- County seat: Colusa
- Largest city: Colusa (population); Williams (area)

Government
  - Type: Council–CAO
  - Chair: Jose Merced Corona
  - Vice Chair: Janice Bell
  - Board of Supervisors: Supervisors: Jose Merced Corona; Daurice Kalfsbeek Smith; Kent S. Boes; Randy Wilson; Janice Bell
  - County Administrative Officer: Joshua Pack

Area
  - Total: 1,156 sq mi (2,990 km^{2})
  - Land: 1,151 sq mi (2,980 km^{2})
  - Water: 5.6 sq mi (15 km^{2})
- Highest elevation: 7,059 ft (2,152 m)

Population (2020)
  - Total: 21,839
  - Estimate (2025): 21,836 ▼
  - Density: 18.97/sq mi (7.326/km^{2})

GDP
  - Total: $1.781 billion (2022)
- Time zone: UTC-8 (Pacific Time Zone)
  - Summer (DST): UTC-7 (Pacific Daylight Time)
- Area code: 530
- Congressional district: 1st
- Website: www.countyofcolusaca.gov

Colusa County (/kəˈluːsə/) is a county located in the U.S. state of California. As of the 2020 census, the population was 21,839. The county seat is Colusa. It is in the northern Sacramento Valley, northwest of the state capital, Sacramento.

== History ==
Colusa County is one of the original counties of California, created in 1850 at the time of statehood. and the name was spelled Colusi County in 1893, Parts of the county's territory were given to Tehama County in 1856 and to Glenn County in 1891.

The county was named after the 1844 Rancho Colus Mexican land grant to John Bidwell. The name of the county in the original state legislative act of 1850 was spelled Colusi, and often in newspapers was spelled Coluse. The word is derived from the name of a Patwin village known as Ko'-roo or Korusi located on the west side of the Sacramento River on the site of the present-day city of Colusa. The name was established as Colusa by 1855.

=== Early history ===
Present-day Colusa County was originally home to the Patwin band of the Wintun people, whose territory included areas along the Sacramento River as well as lands extending west towards Lake County, bounded in the north by the sources of Stony Creek near Stonyford and in the south by Putah Creek.

Linguistically, the Patwin people in the Colusa area spoke two dialects of the Southern Wintuan language. River Patwin was spoken in villages along the Sacramento River, including at Korusi, site of the present city of Colusa. Hill Patwin was spoken in the plains and foothills to the west.

=== European settlement ===
Present-day Colusa County was included as part of three Mexican land grants: John Bidwell's smaller 1845 Rancho Colus grant, which included the modern city of Colusa; the larger 1844 Rancho Jimeno grant, which surrounded the Colus grant; and the 1844 Larkin's Children grant, located upriver from Colusa near the present town of Princeton, California.

== Geography ==
According to the U.S. Census Bureau, the county has a total area of 1,156 square miles (2,990 km^{2}), of which 1,151 square miles (2,980 km^{2}) is land and 5.6 square miles (15 km^{2}) (0.5%) is water. A large number of streams drain the county, including Elk Creek, Salt Creek, Stony Creek and Bear Creek.

The county's eastern boundary is formed, in part, by the Sacramento River.

=== Adjacent counties ===
- Glenn County - north
- Butte County - northeast
- Sutter County - east
- Yolo County - south
- Lake County - west

=== National protected areas ===
- Butte Sink National Wildlife Refuge (part)
- Colusa National Wildlife Refuge
- Delevan National Wildlife Refuge
- Mendocino National Forest (part)
- Sacramento National Wildlife Refuge (part)

== Demographics ==
Historical population
Census	Pop.	Note	%±
1850	115		—
1860	2,274		1,877.4%
1870	6,165		171.1%
1880	13,118		112.8%
1890	14,640		11.6%
1900	7,364		−49.7%
1910	7,732		5.0%
1920	9,290		20.2%
1930	10,258		10.4%
1940	9,788		−4.6%
1950	11,651		19.0%
1960	12,075		3.6%
1970	12,430		2.9%
1980	12,791		2.9%
1990	16,275		27.2%
2000	18,804		15.5%
2010	21,419		13.9%
2020	21,839		2.0%
2025 (est.)	21,836	Steady	0.0%
U.S. Decennial Census; 1790–1960 1900–1990; 1990–2000 2010 2020

=== 2020 census ===
As of the 2020 census, the county had a population of 21,839. The median age was 35.5 years, with 28.0% of residents under the age of 18 and 14.9% 65 years and older. For every 100 females there were 101.4 males, and for every 100 females age 18 and over there were 99.2 males age 18 and over.

The racial makeup of the county was 42.9% White, 0.9% Black or African American, 2.3% American Indian and Alaska Native, 1.3% Asian, 0.4% Native Hawaiian and Pacific Islander, 32.7% from some other race, and 19.5% from two or more races. Hispanic or Latino residents of any race comprised 61.7% of the population.

57.3% of residents lived in urban areas, while 42.7% lived in rural areas.

There were 7,227 households in the county, of which 43.4% had children under the age of 18 living with them and 23.3% had a female householder with no spouse or partner present. About 20.7% of all households were made up of individuals and 10.4% had someone living alone who was 65 years of age or older.

There were 8,099 housing units, of which 10.8% were vacant. Among occupied housing units, 61.1% were owner-occupied and 38.9% were renter-occupied. The homeowner vacancy rate was 1.3% and the rental vacancy rate was 3.9%.

=== Racial and ethnic composition ===
Colusa County, California – Racial and ethnic composition Note: the US Census treats Hispanic/Latino as an ethnic category. This table excludes Latinos from the racial categories and assigns them to a separate category. Hispanics/Latinos may be of any race.
Race / Ethnicity (NH = Non-Hispanic)	Pop 1980	Pop 1990	Pop 2000	Pop 2010	Pop 2020	% 1980	% 1990	% 2000	% 2010	% 2020
White alone (NH)	9,650	10,105	9,018	8,524	6,941	75.44%	62.09%	47.96%	39.80%	31.78%
Black or African American alone (NH)	69	81	88	168	182	0.54%	0.50%	0.47%	0.78%	0.83%
Native American or Alaska Native alone (NH)	194	302	316	296	280	1.52%	1.86%	1.68%	1.38%	1.28%
Asian alone (NH)	233	321	220	267	252	1.82%	1.97%	1.17%	1.25%	1.15%
Native Hawaiian or Pacific Islander alone (NH)	x	x	67	59	70	x	x	0.36%	0.28%	0.32%
Other race alone (NH)	152	42	34	29	92	1.19%	0.26%	0.18%	0.14%	0.42%
Mixed race or Multiracial (NH)	x	x	309	272	546	x	x	1.64%	1.27%	2.50%
Hispanic or Latino (any race)	2,493	5,424	8,752	11,804	13,476	19.49%	33.33%	46.54%	55.11%	61.71%
Total	12,791	16,275	18,804	21,419	21,839	100.00%	100.00%	100.00%	100.00%	100.00%

=== American Community Survey 2025 data ===
The United States Census Bureau estimated that in 2025, Colusa County’s population was 21.836. It was also estimated that the county's population was 29,56% Non-Hispanic White, 64,45% Hispanic or Latino, 0,86% Non-Hispanic Black, 1,47% Asian, 1,32% Native American, 0,38% Pacific Islander, and 1,97% Multiracial.

Total	Population	Percentage
Non-Hispanic White	6.455	29,56%
Hispanic or Latino	14.073	64,45%
Non-Hispanic Black	187	0,86%
Asian	321	1,47%
Native American	288	1,32%
Pacific Islander	82	0,38%
Non-Hispanic Multiracial	430	1,97%

=== 2010 ===
The 2010 United States census reported that Colusa County had a population of 21,419. The racial makeup of Colusa County was 13,854 (64.7%) White, 195 (0.9%) African American, 419 (2.0%) Native American, 281 (1.3%) Asian, 68 (0.3%) Pacific Islander, 5,838 (27.3%) from other races, and 764 (3.6%) from two or more races. Hispanic or Latino of any race were 11,804 persons (55.1%).

Population reported at 2010 United States census
The County	Total; Population	White	African; American	Native; American	Asian	Pacific; Islander	other races	two or more races	Hispanic or Latino (of any race)
Colusa County	21,419	13,854	195	419	281	68	5,838	764	11,804
Incorporated cities	Total; Population	White	African; American	Native; American	Asian	Pacific; Islander	other races	two or more races	Hispanic or Latino (of any race)
Colusa	5,971	3,944	54	107	80	28	1,510	248	3,128
Williams	5,123	2,785	59	55	94	4	1,946	180	3,891
Census-designated places	Total; Population	White	African; American	Native; American	Asian	Pacific; Islander	other races	two or more races	Hispanic or Latino (of any race)
Arbuckle	3,028	1,746	18	23	18	5	1,124	94	2,116
College City	290	207	0	5	1	0	51	26	134
Grimes	391	284	7	3	1	0	65	31	258
Lodoga	197	167	16	4	2	2	3	3	8
Maxwell	1,103	734	11	14	9	2	306	27	570
Princeton	303	217	0	10	1	1	70	4	93
Stonyford	149	127	0	4	0	1	12	5	22
Other unincorporated areas	Total; Population	White	African; American	Native; American	Asian	Pacific; Islander	other races	two or more races	Hispanic or Latino (of any race)
All others not CDPs (combined)	4,864	3,643	30	194	75	25	751	146	1,584

=== 2000 census ===
As of the census of 2000, there were 18,804 people, 6,097 households, and 4,578 families residing in the county. The population density was 16 people per square mile (6.2 people/km^{2}). There were 6,774 housing units at an average density of 6 per square mile (2.3/km^{2}). The racial makeup of the county was 64.3% White, 0.6% Black or African American, 2.3% Native American, 1.2% Asian, 0.4% Pacific Islander, 26.7% from other races, and 4.5% from two or more races. 46.5% of the population were Hispanic or Latino of any race. 8.5% were of German, 5.6% English, 5.5% American and 5.4% Irish ancestry according to Census 2000. 58.7% spoke English and 40.4% Spanish as their first language.

There were 6,097 households, out of which 41.4% had children under the age of 18 living with them, 59.6% were married couples living together, 9.6% had a female householder with no husband present, and 24.9% were non-families. 21.5% of all households were made up of individuals, and 10.1% had someone living alone who was 65 years of age or older. The average household size was 3.01 and the average family size was 3.51.

In the county, the population was spread out, with 31.6% under the age of 18, 10.3% from 18 to 24, 26.9% from 25 to 44, 19.8% from 45 to 64, and 11.4% who were 65 years of age or older. The median age was 32 years. For every 100 females there were 103.4 males. For every 100 females age 18 and over, there were 103.8 males.

The median income for a household in the county was $35,062, and the median income for a family was $40,138. Males had a median income of $32,210 versus $21,521 for females. The per capita income for the county was $14,730. About 13.0% of families and 16.1% of the population were below the poverty line, including 19.5% of those under age 18 and 8.2% of those age 65 or over.

== Politics ==
=== Voter registration statistics ===
Population and registered voters
Total eligible population	13,214	
Registered voters (Note: Percentage of registered voters with respect to total population. Percentages of party members with respect to registered voters follow.)	10,144	76.7%
Democratic	3,214	24.3%
Republican	4,062	30.7%
Democratic–Republican spread	-848	-6.4%
American Independent	376	2.8%
Libertarian	141	1.0%
Green	29	0.2%
Peace and Freedom	64	0.4%
Unknown	2	0.0%
Other	17	0.1%
No party preference	2,239	16.9%

==== Cities by population and voter registration ====
Cities by population and voter registration
City	Population	Registered voters	Democratic	Republican	D–R spread	Other	No party preference
Colusa	5,951	37.8%	35.5%	44.6%	-9.1%	5.6%	16.8%
Williams	5,003	22.7%	43.5%	31.4%	+12.1%	3.1%	23.0%

=== Overview ===
In its early history Colusa was one of the most reliable Democratic counties in California. Along with Mariposa County, it was one of only two counties in the Pacific States to support Alton B. Parker in 1904. From 1880 until 1952, Colusa only went Republican during the GOP landslides of the Roaring Twenties. Since 1952, however, Colusa has become a strongly Republican county in Presidential and congressional elections, with Lyndon Johnson, in 1964, being the last Democrat to win the county.

United States presidential election results for Colusa County, California
Year	Republican		Democratic		Third party(ies)	
Year	No.	%	No.	%	No.	%
1892	645	31.08%	1,187	57.20%	243	11.71%
1896	581	30.86%	1,250	66.38%	52	2.76%
1900	648	35.98%	1,075	59.69%	78	4.33%
1904	885	46.78%	900	47.57%	107	5.66%
1908	730	38.58%	1,064	56.24%	98	5.18%
1912	3	0.11%	1,760	63.58%	1,005	36.31%
1916	1,011	31.82%	1,998	62.89%	168	5.29%
1920	1,645	61.24%	907	33.77%	134	4.99%
1924	1,127	43.84%	495	19.25%	949	36.91%
1928	1,752	56.30%	1,338	42.99%	22	0.71%
1932	1,095	27.50%	2,752	69.11%	135	3.39%
1936	1,186	28.15%	2,965	70.38%	62	1.47%
1940	1,774	39.74%	2,655	59.48%	35	0.78%
1944	1,579	42.92%	2,090	56.81%	10	0.27%
1948	1,803	46.22%	2,020	51.78%	78	2.00%
1952	2,824	59.81%	1,881	39.83%	17	0.36%
1956	2,474	53.23%	2,171	46.71%	3	0.06%
1960	2,497	51.37%	2,348	48.30%	16	0.33%
1964	1,811	39.32%	2,790	60.57%	5	0.11%
1968	2,361	51.58%	1,858	40.59%	358	7.82%
1972	2,715	57.56%	1,810	38.37%	192	4.07%
1976	2,733	52.74%	2,340	45.16%	109	2.10%
1980	2,897	58.00%	1,605	32.13%	493	9.87%
1984	3,388	65.30%	1,725	33.25%	75	1.45%
1988	3,077	59.49%	2,022	39.10%	73	1.41%
1992	2,589	45.94%	1,798	31.91%	1,248	22.15%
1996	3,047	54.29%	2,054	36.60%	511	9.11%
2000	3,629	64.92%	1,745	31.22%	216	3.86%
2004	4,142	67.17%	1,947	31.58%	77	1.25%
2008	3,733	58.07%	2,569	39.96%	127	1.98%
2012	3,601	59.68%	2,314	38.35%	119	1.97%
2016	3,551	53.54%	2,661	40.12%	420	6.33%
2020	4,559	57.27%	3,239	40.69%	163	2.05%
2024	4,414	62.87%	2,431	34.62%	176	2.51%

Colusa County is in California's 1st congressional district, represented by Republican James Gallagher. In the State Assembly, Colusa County is in the 4th Assembly district, represented by Democrat Cecilia Aguiar-Curry. In the State Senate, the county is in the 1st senatorial district, represented by Republican Megan Dahle. On November 4, 2008, Colusa County voted 71.6% for Proposition 8 which amended the California Constitution to ban same-sex marriages.

== Crime ==
The following table includes the number of incidents reported and the rate per 1,000 persons for each type of offense.

Population and crime rates
Population	21,297	
Violent crime	59	2.77
Homicide	1	0.05
Forcible rape	13	0.61
Robbery	8	0.38
Aggravated assault	37	1.74
Property crime	352	16.53
Burglary	197	9.25
Larceny-theft (Note: Only larceny-theft cases involving property over $400 in value are reported as property crimes.)	293	13.76
Motor vehicle theft	37	1.74
Arson	3	0.14

=== Cities by population and crime rates ===
Cities by population and crime rates
City	Population	Violent crimes	Violent crime rate per 1,000 persons	Property crimes	Property crime rate per 1,000 persons
Colusa	6,065	11	1.81	170	28.03
Williams	5,200	9	1.73	76	14.62

== Transportation ==
=== Major highways ===
- Interstate 5
- State Route 16
- State Route 20
- State Route 45

=== Public transportation ===
Colusa County Transit runs buses from Colusa to Williams, Arbuckle, Grimes and College City, with limited service to Maxwell.

=== Airports ===
Colusa County Airport is a general-aviation airport located near the city of Colusa. The closest major airport is in Sacramento.

== Communities ==
=== Cities ===
- Colusa (county seat)
- Williams

=== Census-designated places ===
- Arbuckle
- College City
- Grimes
- Lodoga
- Maxwell
- Princeton
- Stonyford

=== Unincorporated community ===
- Sites

=== Population ranking ===
The population ranking of the following table is based on the 2010 census of Colusa County.

† county seat

Rank	City/Town/etc.	Municipal type	Population (2010 Census)
1	† Colusa	City	5,971
2	Williams	City	5,123
3	Arbuckle	CDP	3,028
4	Maxwell	CDP	1,103
5	Grimes	CDP	391
6	Princeton	CDP	303
7	College City	CDP	290
8	Lodoga	CDP	197
9	Stonyford	CDP	149
10	Colusa Rancheria	AIAN	76
11	Cortina Rancheria	AIAN	21

== Education ==
School districts include:

- Colusa Unified School District
- Maxwell Unified School District
- Pierce Joint Unified School District
- Princeton Joint Unified School District
- Stony Creek Joint Unified School District
- Williams Unified School District

== California Historical Landmarks ==
California Historical Landmarks in Colusa County:

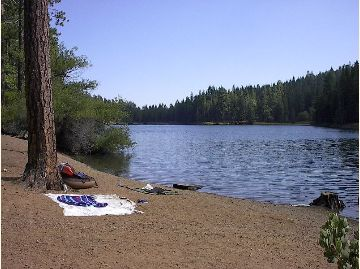
Letts Lake

- Colusa County Courthouse built in 1861.
- Letts Valley settled in 1855 by Jack and David Lett. Marker at Letts Lake Campground at Letts Lake.
- Swift's Stone Corral, built by Granville P. Swift in 1850.

== See also ==
- List of school districts in Colusa County, California
- National Register of Historic Places listings in Colusa County, California
- Thomas D. Harp, mentions 1891 division of the county
