= Dibble Creek =

Stream in California, U.S.

Coordinates: 40.1926°N 122.2279°W

Dibble Creek is a stream in the U.S. state of California. The stream flows for 15 miles (24 km) until it empties into the Sacramento River.

Dibble Creek has the name of Abraham Dibble, a pioneer settler.
