= Lodoga, California =

Lodoga
- census-designated place
- Location in California
- Coordinates: 39°18′07″N 122°29′21″W
- Country: United States
- State: California
- County: Colusa

Area
  - Total: 3.387 sq mi (8.772 km^{2})
  - Land: 3.387 sq mi (8.772 km^{2})
  - Water: 0 sq mi (0 km^{2}) 0%
- Elevation: 1,237 ft (377 m)

Population (2020)
  - Total: 184
  - Density: 54.3/sq mi (21.0/km^{2})
- Time zone: UTC-8 (Pacific (PST))
  - Summer (DST): UTC-7 (PDT)
- ZIP code: 95979
- FIPS code: 06-42230
- GNIS feature IDs: 234181, 2583059

Lodoga (also Ladoga) is a census-designated place in Colusa County, California, United States. It lies at an elevation of 1237 feet (377 m). Lodoga's population was 184 at the 2020 census.

== History ==
The postal authorities established a post office at Lodoga in 1898, closed it in 1913, reopened it later in 1913, closed it again in 1917, reopened it again in 1924, and closed it permanently in 1954.

The locality stands at the southern end of the East Park Reservoir, formed by the East Park Dam after its construction in 1910. The dam, the reservoir, and other surrounding irrigation facilities were some of the first projects undertaken by the United States Bureau of Reclamation.

== Demographics ==
Historical population
| Census | Pop. | Note | %± |
|---|---|---|---|
| 2010 | 197 | | — |
| 2020 | 184 | | −6.6% |
U.S. Decennial Census; 2010

Lodoga first appeared as a census designated place in the 2010 U.S. census.

The 2020 United States census reported that Lodoga had a population of 184. The population density was 54.3 inhabitants per square mile (21.0/km^{2}). The racial makeup of Lodoga was 158 (85.9%) White, 9 (4.9%) African American, 0 (0.0%) Native American, 3 (1.6%) Asian, 0 (0.0%) Pacific Islander, 8 (4.3%) from other races, and 6 (3.3%) from two or more races. Hispanic or Latino of any race were 23 persons (12.5%).

The whole population lived in households. There were 90 households, out of which 17 (18.9%) had children under the age of 18 living in them, 42 (46.7%) were married-couple households, 2 (2.2%) were cohabiting couple households, 26 (28.9%) had a female householder with no partner present, and 20 (22.2%) had a male householder with no partner present. 28 households (31.1%) were one person, and 17 (18.9%) were one person aged 65 or older. The average household size was 2.04. There were 56 families (62.2% of all households).

The age distribution was 28 people (15.2%) under the age of 18, 2 people (1.1%) aged 18 to 24, 21 people (11.4%) aged 25 to 44, 66 people (35.9%) aged 45 to 64, and 67 people (36.4%) who were 65 years of age or older. The median age was 58.3 years. There were 88 males and 96 females.

There were 174 housing units at an average density of 51.4 units per square mile (19.8 units/km^{2}), of which 90 (51.7%) were occupied. Of these, 79 (87.8%) were owner-occupied, and 11 (12.2%) were occupied by renters.

== Education ==
Lodoga is served by the Maxwell Unified School District.
