= College City, California =

College City
- Census-designated place
- Location in California
- Coordinates: 39°00′21″N 122°00′34″W
- Country: United States
- State: California
- County: Colusa

Area
  - Total: 2.93 sq mi (7.60 km^{2})
  - Land: 2.93 sq mi (7.60 km^{2})
  - Water: 0 sq mi (0.00 km^{2}) 0%
- Elevation: 72 ft (22 m)

Population (2020)
  - Total: 292
  - Density: 99.5/sq mi (38.42/km^{2})
- Time zone: UTC-8 (Pacific (PST))
  - Summer (DST): UTC-7 (PDT)
- ZIP Code: 95912
- Area codes: 530, 837
- FIPS code: 06-14554
- GNIS feature IDs: 1658299, 2582979

College City is a census-designated place in Colusa County, California, United States. It lies at an elevation of 72 feet (22 m) above sea level. Its ZIP code is 95912, and its area code is 530. Its population was 292 at the 2020 census. Despite the name, there is currently no college in College City.

== History ==
College City began when a school was built with the money from the sale of property left by the will of Andrew Pierce, who died around April 1871. Two years later in 1873, the College City post office was established. In January 1875 a newspaper article promoted College City and stated that the town had "two general stores, one hotel, one livery stable, one saddler shop, one shoe shop, two blacksmith and wagon shops, one butcher shop, one bakery, numerous boarding houses, drug store and milliner shop and... Chinese wash houses."

Pierce Christian College was opened on September 14, 1875, to both male and female students on land that was endowed by Andrew Pierce. The school building was 30 feet by 40 feet, and 17 feet tall. The college would later leave College City in 1896, and its facilities were taken over by the local high school district.

The population of College City was 53 in 1900, and was estimated at 300 in 1940.

== Demographics ==
Historical population
Census	Pop.	Note	%±
2010	290		—
2020	292		0.7%
U.S. Decennial Census; 2010

=== 2020 census ===
As of the 2020 census, College City had a population of 292. The population density was 99.5 inhabitants per square mile (38.4/km^{2}). For every 100 females there were 82.5 males, and for every 100 females age 18 and over there were 80.3 males age 18 and over.

0.0% of residents lived in urban areas, while 100.0% lived in rural areas.

The age distribution was 72 people (24.7%) under the age of 18, 36 people (12.3%) aged 18 to 24, 55 people (18.8%) aged 25 to 44, 67 people (22.9%) aged 45 to 64, and 62 people (21.2%) who were 65 years of age or older. The median age was 39.6 years.

The whole population lived in households. There were 93 households in College City, of which 24 (25.8%) had children under the age of 18 living in them. Of all households, 50 (53.8%) were married-couple households, 3 (3.2%) were cohabiting couple households, 25 (26.9%) were households with a female householder and no spouse or partner present, and 15 (16.1%) were households with a male householder and no spouse or partner present. About 22 households (23.7%) were made up of individuals and 12 (12.9%) had someone living alone who was 65 years of age or older. The average household size was 3.14. There were 65 families (69.9% of all households).

There were 102 housing units at an average density of 34.8 units per square mile (13.4 units/km^{2}), of which 93 (91.2%) were occupied. Of these, 60 (64.5%) were owner-occupied, and 33 (35.5%) were occupied by renters. The homeowner vacancy rate was 1.5% and the rental vacancy rate was 5.6%.

Racial composition as of the 2020 census
Race	Number	Percent
White	100	34.2%
Black or African American	0	0.0%
American Indian and Alaska Native	6	2.1%
Asian	3	1.0%
Native Hawaiian and Other Pacific Islander	2	0.7%
Some other race	108	37.0%
Two or more races	73	25.0%
Hispanic or Latino (of any race)	201	68.8%

=== 2010 census ===
College City first appeared as a census designated place in the 2010 U.S. census.

== Politics ==
In the state legislature, College City is in the 1st senatorial district, represented by Republican Megan Dahle, and the 4th Assembly district, represented by Democrat Cecilia Aguiar-Curry. Federally, College City is in California's 1st congressional district, represented by Republican James Gallagher.

== Education ==
College City is served by the Pierce Joint Unified School District.
