= Arbuckle, California =

- Census-designated place
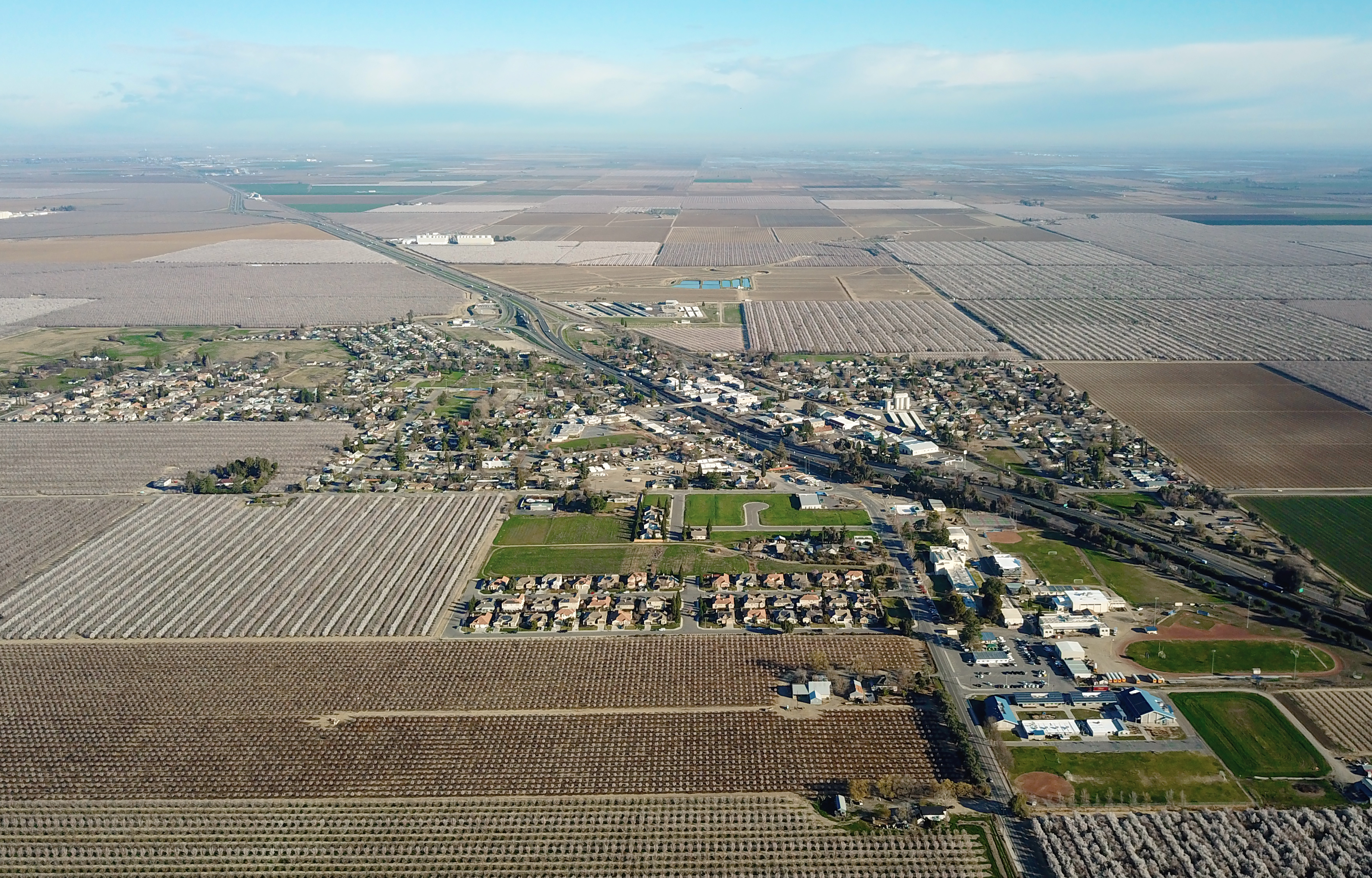
- Aerial view in 2025

- Location in Colusa County and the U.S. state of California

- Location in the contiguous United States
- Coordinates: 39°01′03″N 122°03′28″W
- Country: United States
- State: California
- County: Colusa

Area
  - Total: 1.76 sq mi (4.56 km^{2})
  - Land: 1.76 sq mi (4.56 km^{2})
  - Water: 0 sq mi (0.00 km^{2}) 0%
- Elevation: 141 ft (43 m)

Population (2020)
  - Total: 3,484
  - Density: 1,978.9/sq mi (764.05/km^{2})
- Time zone: UTC-8 (Pacific (PST))
  - Summer (DST): UTC-7 (PDT)
- ZIP code: 95912
- Area codes: 530, 837
- FIPS code: 06-02420
- GNIS feature IDs: 1657943, 2407755
- Website: https://www.countyofcolusa.org/index.aspx?NID=217

Arbuckle is a census-designated place (CDP) in Colusa County, California, United States. The population was 3,484 at the 2020 census. Arbuckle is situated in the southerly portion of Colusa County, approximately 20 miles (32 km) southwest of the City of Colusa, the county seat. The town is characterized by single-family residences, multiple-family units, some mobile homes, commercial activities, and a lack of barns. Land surrounding Arbuckle is agriculture including cultivated annual crops, and both active and unmaintained orchards (primarily almond). Various almond hullers may be found near the area. Regional access is provided by the north–south running Interstate 5, along with Old Highway 99 West running alongside Interstate 5.

== History ==
Tacitus R. Arbuckle initially established a ranch here in 1866. The railroad came in 1875 and the town was founded and named for Arbuckle, on whose land it was built. The post office was established the following year, 1876.

== Geography ==
Two streams drain the area, the Salt and Elk Creeks. The Salt Creek flows north in the area, then bends east, and is joined by Elk Creek. Both streams join Sand Creek a half mile northeast of the town and flow in a northeast direction. Salt Creek is subject to periodic flooding during heavy rainfall.

The town sank 2.14 feet (0.65 m) between 2008 and 2017 according to a report issued by the California Department of Water Resources in coordination with 19 local and state agencies. A study that analyzed over 300 sites across the Sacramento Valley found that this area had sunk due to groundwater-related subsidence more than any other area in the study. Subsidence occurred as water was removed from the underground aquifers and the surrounding soil collapsed upon itself.

== Demographics ==
Historical population
Census	Pop.	Note	%±
1970	1,037		—
1980	1,306		25.9%
1990	1,912		46.4%
2000	2,332		22.0%
2010	3,028		29.8%
2020	3,484		15.1%
U.S. Decennial Census; 1860–1870 1880-1890; 1900 1910 1920; 1930 1940 1950; 1960 1970 1980; 1990 2000 2010

Arbuckle first appeared as an unincorporated community in the 1970 U.S. census; and as a census-designated place in the 1980 United States census.

=== 2020 census ===
As of the 2020 census, Arbuckle had a population of 3,484 and a population density of 1,978.4 inhabitants per square mile (763.9/km^{2}). The median age was 32.8 years. The age distribution was 31.1% under the age of 18, 8.4% aged 18 to 24, 28.7% aged 25 to 44, 21.7% aged 45 to 64, and 10.0% who were 65 years of age or older. For every 100 females, there were 103.9 males, and for every 100 females age 18 and over, there were 100.6 males age 18 and over.

0.0% of residents lived in urban areas, while 100.0% lived in rural areas. The whole population lived in households. There were 1,000 households, out of which 51.6% included children under the age of 18. Of all households, 64.1% were married-couple households, 4.9% were cohabiting couple households, 18.4% had a female householder with no spouse or partner present, and 12.6% had a male householder with no spouse or partner present. 13.0% of households were one person, and 4.7% were one person aged 65 or older. The average household size was 3.48. There were 834 families (83.4% of all households).

There were 1,049 housing units at an average density of 595.7 units per square mile (230.0 units/km^{2}), of which 1,000 (95.3%) were occupied. Of these, 65.1% were owner-occupied and 34.9% were occupied by renters. 4.7% of housing units were vacant, with a homeowner vacancy rate of 0.9% and a rental vacancy rate of 0.0%.

Racial composition as of the 2020 census
Race	Number	Percent
White	1,347	38.7%
Black or African American	35	1.0%
American Indian and Alaska Native	40	1.1%
Asian	30	0.9%
Native Hawaiian and Other Pacific Islander	5	0.1%
Some other race	1,194	34.3%
Two or more races	833	23.9%
Hispanic or Latino (of any race)	2,560	73.5%

=== Income and poverty ===
In 2023, the US Census Bureau estimated that the median household income was $83,677, and the per capita income was $26,964.

== Politics ==
In the state legislature, Arbuckle is in the 1st senatorial district, represented by Republican Megan Dahle, and the 4th Assembly district, represented by Democrat Cecilia Aguiar-Curry. Federally, Arbuckle is in California's 1st congressional district, represented by Republican James Gallagher.

== Education ==
The CDP is served by the Pierce Joint Unified School District.

== Notable people ==
- Frederick C. Weyand (1916–2010) was general in the United States Army who served as the 28th Chief of Staff of the United States Army from 1972 to 1974.
