= Maxwell, California =

- census-designated place
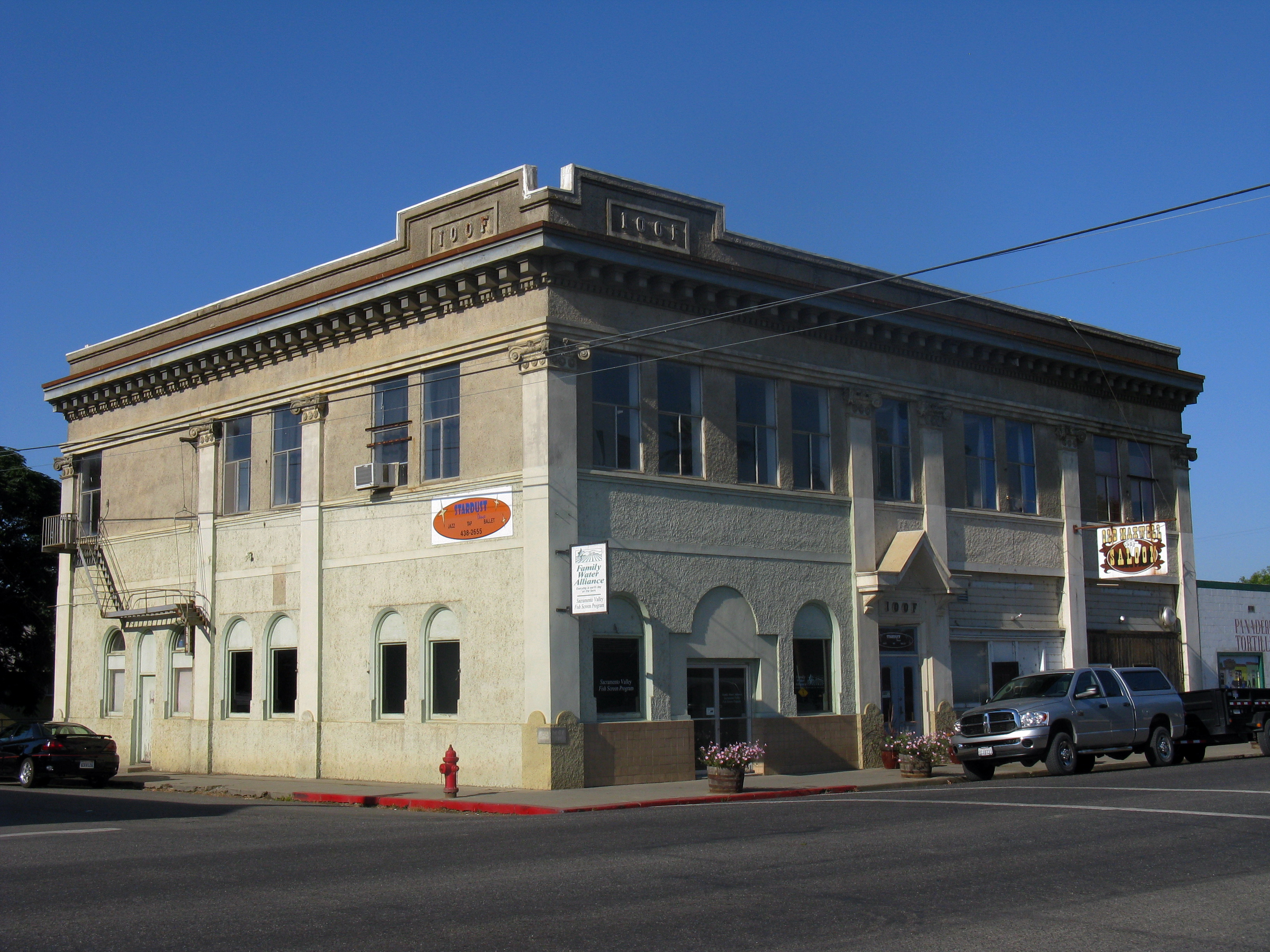
- A building in Maxwell

- Location in California
- Coordinates: 39°16′37″N 122°11′41″W
- Country: United States
- State: California
- County: Colusa

Area
  - Total: 2.150 sq mi (5.569 km^{2})
  - Land: 2.150 sq mi (5.569 km^{2})
  - Water: 0 sq mi (0 km^{2})
- Elevation: 95 ft (29 m)

Population (2020)
  - Total: 1,067
  - Density: 496.2/sq mi (191.6/km^{2})
- Time zone: UTC-8 (Pacific (PST))
  - Summer (DST): UTC-7 (PDT)
- ZIP Code: 95955
- Area codes: 530, 837
- GNIS feature IDs: 2583074

Maxwell (formerly, Occident) is a census-designated place and farm community in Colusa County, California, United States. It lies at an elevation of 95 feet (29 m). Located off Interstate 5, it is home to Maxwell High School. The main crop grown is rice, though a variety of others such as grapes, almonds, olives, squash, and sunflowers are grown as well. Its ZIP code is 95955 and its area code is 530. Maxwell's population was 1,067 at the 2020 census.

== History ==
The community bears the name of its founder. Swifts Stone Corral is listed as a California Historical Landmark No. 238. The original owner and builder of this stone corral was Granville P. Swift, a native of Kentucky. In 1847 Swift began ranching in Stone Creek Valley in Colusa County. In 1850 he and his partner Frank Sears needed a corral and, as there was no timber in the surrounding country, they built one from the flat stones that were scattered over the area.

== Demographics ==
Historical population
Census	Pop.	Note	%±
2010	1,103		—
2020	1,067		−3.3%
U.S. Decennial Census; 2010

Maxwell first appeared as a census designated place in the 2010 U.S. census.

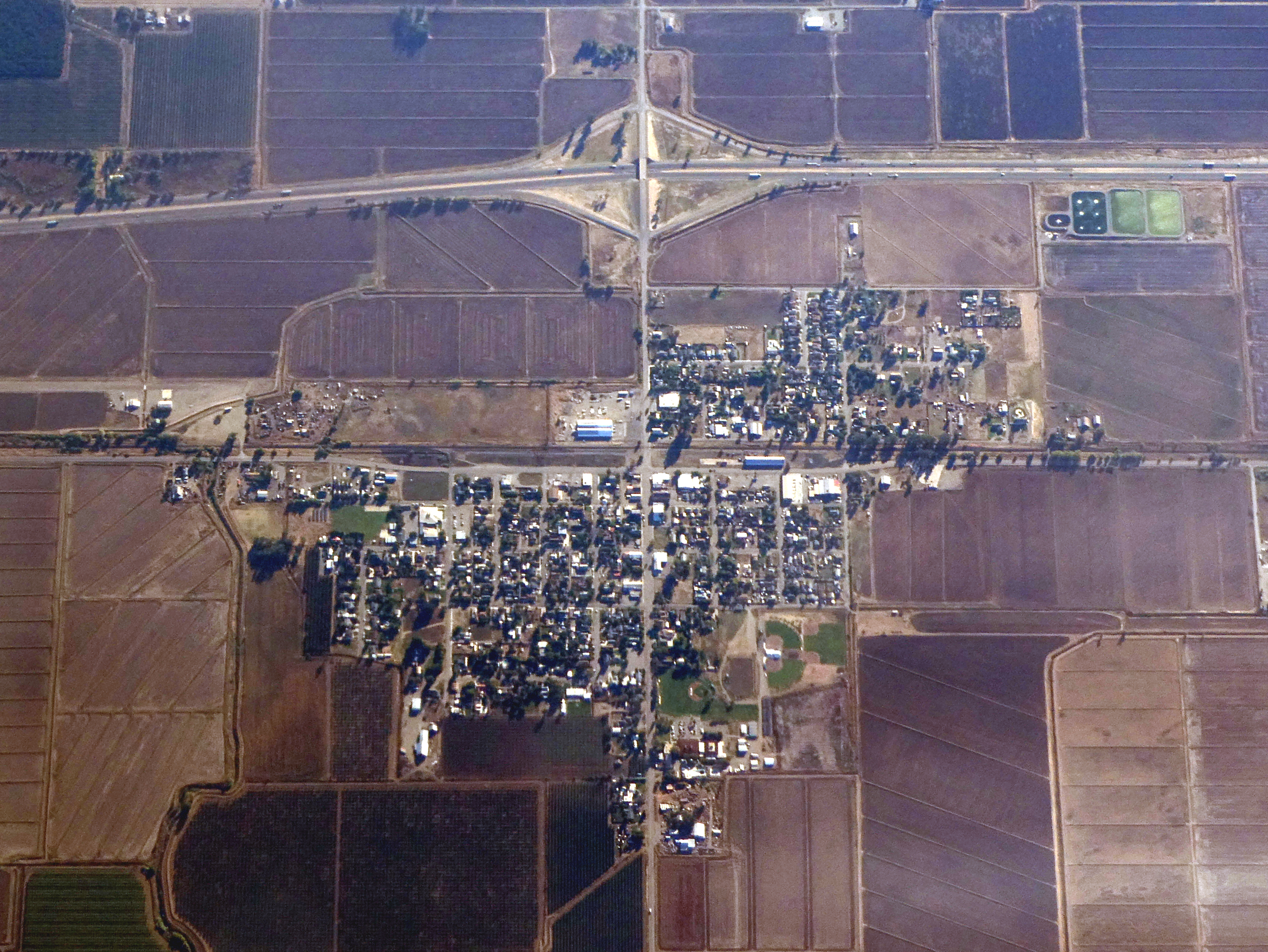
Aerial view of Maxwell in 2022

=== 2020 census ===
As of the 2020 census, Maxwell had a population of 1,067. The population density was 496.3 inhabitants per square mile (191.6/km^{2}). The median age was 34.5 years. For every 100 females, there were 116.0 males, and for every 100 females age 18 and over, there were 115.0 males age 18 and over.

The age distribution was 295 people (27.6%) under the age of 18, 104 people (9.7%) aged 18 to 24, 274 people (25.7%) aged 25 to 44, 238 people (22.3%) aged 45 to 64, and 156 people (14.6%) who were 65 years of age or older.

The whole population lived in households. There were 360 households, out of which 126 (35.0%) had children under the age of 18 living in them, 202 (56.1%) were married-couple households, 16 (4.4%) were cohabiting couple households, 86 (23.9%) had a female householder with no partner present, and 56 (15.6%) had a male householder with no partner present. 70 households (19.4%) were one person, and 32 (8.9%) were one person aged 65 or older. The average household size was 2.96. There were 274 families (76.1% of all households).

There were 380 housing units at an average density of 176.7 units per square mile (68.2 units/km^{2}), of which 360 (94.7%) were occupied. Of these, 193 (53.6%) were owner-occupied, and 167 (46.4%) were occupied by renters. 0.0% of residents lived in urban areas, while 100.0% lived in rural areas. Of the housing units, 5.3% were vacant. The homeowner vacancy rate was 0.5% and the rental vacancy rate was 0.6%.

Racial composition as of the 2020 census
Race	Number	Percent
White	449	42.1%
Black or African American	4	0.4%
American Indian and Alaska Native	24	2.2%
Asian	5	0.5%
Native Hawaiian and Other Pacific Islander	3	0.3%
Some other race	446	41.8%
Two or more races	136	12.7%
Hispanic or Latino (of any race)	654	61.3%

== Politics ==
In the state legislature, Maxwell is in the 1st senatorial district, represented by Republican Megan Dahle, and the 4th Assembly district, represented by Democrat Cecilia Aguiar-Curry. Federally, Maxwell is in California's 1st congressional district, represented by Republican James Gallagher.

== Education ==
The CDP is served by the Maxwell Unified School District.
