= List of California tornadoes =

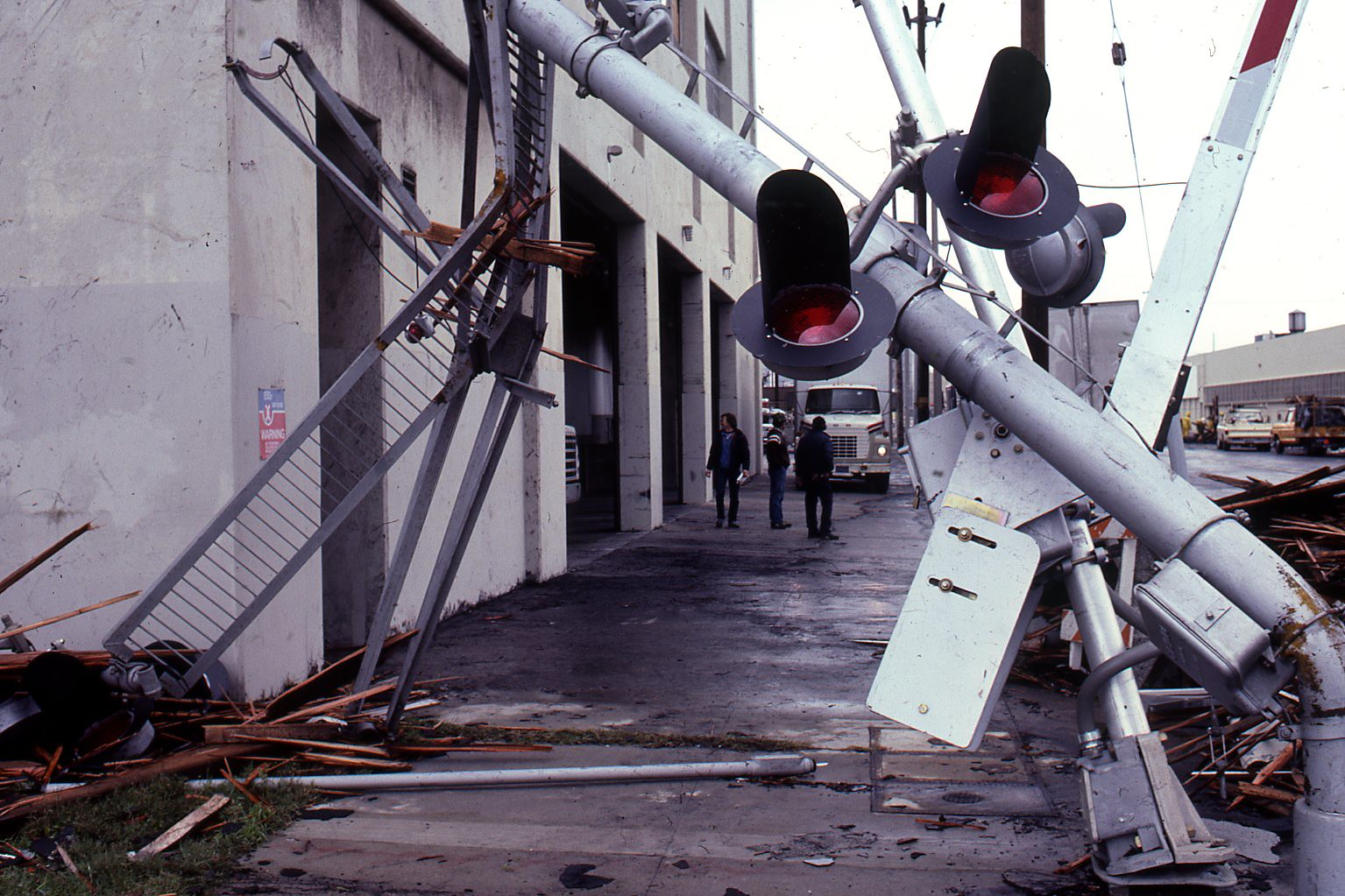
Damage caused by the 1983 Los Angeles tornado

The U.S. state of California experiences several tornadoes every year, with over 500 tornadoes recorded since 1851. Among these are four fire whirls, a type of tornado that develops from a wildfire. California's strongest rated tornadoes on the Fujita scale (or Enhanced Fujita Scale after 2007) were rated an F/EF3, which occurred three times – two F3 tornadoes in the Greater Los Angeles area in the 1970s, as well as an EF3-equivalent fire whirl near Redding in Shasta County that developed within the 2018 Carr Fire. The fire whirl was one of several deadly tornadic events on record in the state, killing four people. All of the deadly tornadic events occurred a long time ago, mainly in the 19th and 20th century. The last deadly event was in Santa Monica, which killed three people in 1952. There have been over 240 injuries related to tornadoes in the state.

Although less common and not as strong as tornadoes in the central United States, there are regularly tornadoes in three regions of the state – the Los Angeles area, the deserts of Southern California, and the Central Valley. Most tornadoes in California are weak and short-lived, often F0 or EF0, although some can be destructive or notable. Tornadogenesis can occur because of a supercell thunderstorm, a waterspout, a landspout, or a fire whirl, and can happen in any month of the year. The month with the most tornadic activity is March, with most of the state's tornadoes occurring between January and April. Excluding fire whirls, the most recent EF2 tornado was in 2011, which touched down near Oroville in Butte County. In July 2004, a tornado touched down in Sequoia National Park at an altitude of around 12,156 ft (3,705 m), making it the highest elevation for a confirmed tornado in the United States. The most California tornadoes on a single day in the state was seven, which occurred on November 9, 1982. There were five tornadoes on April 1, 1996, as well as October 22, 2012. The states most active year was 2005 when the state experienced 27 tornadoes.

The most recent event was on April 21, 2026, when four tornadoes touched down in the Central Valley, with two EF0s, and two EF1s.

== Climatology ==
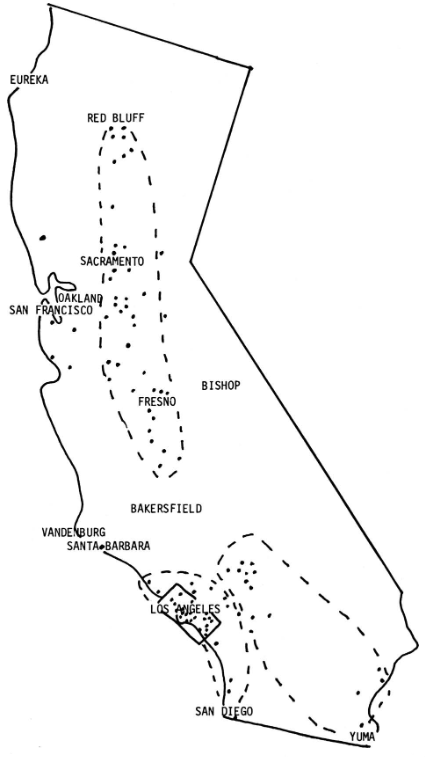
Map of California showing the location of tornadoes between 1962 and 1983

In the United States, tornadoes develop less frequently west of the Rocky Mountains as compared to the rest of the continent. In the state of California, three areas more commonly experience tornadoes – in the Los Angeles area, in the deserts of Southern California, and the Central Valley. The Los Angeles area typically experiences more tornadoes than the rest of the state, and is among the most frequently affected areas in the United States west of the Rockies. California tornadoes are usually weak, categorized as an F0 or F1 on the Fujita scale, or an EF0 or EF1 after the Enhanced Fujita scale was implemented in 2007. Most tornadoes in the state are also short-lived, with an average path of 0.62 mi (1.00 km) and a width of 43 yd (39 m); this compares with Iowa tornadoes with an average path of 4 mi (6.4 km) and a width of 170 yd (160 m). The vast majority of California tornadoes occur between November and April, accounting for 80.2% of the state's tornadoes according to a 1993 survey. This is during the state's cooler period, which contrasts with the rest of the United States which experiences most of its tornadoes from April to June.

Along the Pacific coast, waterspouts occasionally develop over the ocean and move onshore. In addition, some tornadoes can develop from localized convergence zones known as landspouts, which are often weak and short-lived. Landspouts are the source of the majority of California tornadoes. On rare occasion, tornadoes can originate from supercells, which are more similar in nature to tornadoes across the Midwestern United States. Because of their irregular and short-lived nature, the San Diego National Weather Service considers it "nearly impossible to forecast a Southern California tornado before it touches down." The agency utilizes a volunteer group of more than 1,300 volunteers to report local severe weather.

In the Los Angeles area, Santa Ana winds can produce a convergence zone when they interact with Lake Elsinore, which can produce a line of thunderstorms capable of spawning a tornado. A similar phenomenon can occur on the north and east side of mountains extending north to Victorville. The location of the mountains relative to the coastline creates the favorable conditions for tornadogenesis in the Los Angeles Area. Due to the area's high population, even weak tornadoes can cause significant impacts. They mostly occur between September and May, not during the summer. Conversely, warm, tropical air can produce tornadoes in the deserts of southern California during the summer. In the Central Valley, tornadoes can form when the winds from a trough are perpendicular to the coastal range of mountains, bringing onshore moisture from the San Francisco area to the Sierra Nevadas. Tornadoes mostly occurred in March and April in the Central Valley.

== Events ==
Due to the large size of California, there is a likely undercount in the number of rural tornadoes. Also, due to the rare nature of tornadoes in the state, it is possible that some reported tornadoes were other weather events, such as a microburst, or straight-line winds.

=== Pre-1900 ===
FU	F0	F1	F2	F3	F4	F5	Total
58	?	?	1	?	?	?	59
Deaths: 6				Injuries: 37			

- November 24, 1851 – A tornado struck Rich Bar, as it traveled it severely damaged at least 100 trees, some were uprooted; snapped; and hurled. One pine tree fell onto a ranch and another ranch was completely destroyed; several mules and horses were killed.
- September 8, 1857 – A tornado struck Sonora in Tuolumne County. The tornado lifted a 18-foot awing and a stone that secured it. A man was killed when the stone struck him. This was the first tornado fatality in California.
- February 20, 1858 – A tornado struck Copeland in Tehama County; a house and a barn lost their roofs. The tornado then picked up lumber and threw it and killed livestock. An anvil was lifted and thrown, as well as a horse wagon. The tornado caused $2,500 in damage.
- May 31, 1858 – A tornado carried a column of dust, papers, and splinters of wood in Folsom (Sacramento County).
- May 23, 1859 – A tornado struck Horsetown in Shasta County, an extremely small building was destroyed. The tornado caused $1,000 in damage.
- December 18, 1859 – A tornado struck Alameda County destroying a barn and killing a cow. An 18-foot dwelling was torn from its foundation.
- May 3, 1860 – A weak and small tornado struck Sacramento County, damaging a roof from a barn, as well as knocking down trees and fences.
- September 18, 1860 – A weak tornado struck Nevada City and lasted for several minutes. The tornado was described as "shockingly beautiful".
- February 11, 1863 – A tornado struck Near Knight's Ferry in Stanislaus County, a flume was destroyed and several wooden houses were shifted from their foundations.
- January 14, 1864 – A tornado destroyed a building under construction in Alpine County.
- February 28, 1865 – A tornado struck Chico lifting 30 boxes and some were thrown 300 feet; some were swept clean.
- December 25, 1866 – A strong tornado struck Nevada County on around 8 pm. The tornado snapped dozens of trees and destroyed a barn; a shed roof was also blown off and thrown onto another house; a large building containing hay was completely destroyed; a large oak and pine trees were uprooted; an unfinished house's roof was blown off; a 16x60-foot shed roof was lifted and thrown. More property damage occurred.
- February 27, 1867 – A weak tornado struck Nevada County; dozens of trees were toppled and two thousands cords of wood were yielded.
- May 29, 1867 – A strong tornado struck Marysville, the tornado unroofed a shed and a blacksmith shop was completely destroyed. More buildings were damaged and three people were injured as well as $800 in damage. These were the first tornado related injuries in California.
- July 17, 1867 – A weak tornado struck Nevada City. Taking a 2 mi (3.2 km) track, it tore limbs off trees while tearing down fences and awing's.
- August 30, 1867 – A tornado struck San Bernardino around 4 pm, the tornado unroofed a ranch. It also destroyed a barn and flatted a corn field.
- May 26, 1868 – A weak tornado struck in downtown Los Angeles County causing havoc, which resulted in dust and garbage being lifted and damaging trellises, it then dissipated when it traveled to a hill.
- July 6, 1868 – A tornado struck Chico at 8 pm, it damaged large oak trees as well a hotel and a barn.
- March 6, 1869 – A tornado struck Grass Valley lifting a 20 by 30 feat barn and smashing it to the ground, more property damage occurred.
- March 23, 1870 – A small tornado struck Dogtown in Marin County at 3 am. The tornado damaged a blacksmith shop and a storehouse was shifted from its foundation. Other structures were damaged, including a dwelling.
- April 12, 1870 – A large tornado destroyed a small house in Sacramento County.
- April 13, 1870 – A weak tornado struck Los Angeles County, damaging a small building and smashing a wooden awing.
- February 21, 1871 – A tornado struck San Francisco around midnight, damaging trees.
- January 24, 1872 – An outbreak of three tornadoes hit the state, the first struck Yuba County, the tornado had a width of 1,760 yd (1,610 m), damaging at least 100 trees, each of which, were either uprooted or had their branches torn off. The damaged trees blocked roads and were inaccessible. This may be California's largest tornado. The second struck Nevada County, damaging dozens of trees, some were toppled. Minor roof damaged occurred to a house, and was carried by the wind. The last tornado struck Los Angeles, this was California's first tornado outbreak.
- April 1, 1872 – A strong tornado struck Butte County, a large building was completely destroyed, with the roof landing 200 yards away, other buildings were damaged, as well as trees being uprooted or torn from the ground.
- May 8, 1872 – A tornado struck Jacksons Ferry destroying an old building and fences, as it traveled, more damage occurred to a boat from a river.
- October 1, 1872 – A tornado struck San Francisco, destroying a barn.
- January 6, 1873 – A tornado struck Modoc County, a home was shifted from its foundation and flipped upside down, injuring two people.
- February 23, 1873 – A tornado struck Plumas County destroying a church and damaged two pine trees.
- October 10, 1873 – A tornado struck near Cambria in San Luis Obispo County, lifting a vehicle from the ground and leveling sand hills.
- December 15, 1873 – Two tornadoes hit the state, the first struck Stanislaus County. The second was a strong tornado that struck Calaveras County, it demolished dozens of houses, a large blacksmith shop was also leveled. The tornado then traveled to an unfinished hotel, tearing it from its foundation and tearing a small frame structure. More buildings were damaged, including a hay barn. The tornado then severely damaged a railroad depot; it tore off its roof. Six people were injured, two seriously, two carpenters had broken thumbs and bruises on their face. One man was carried by the wind and thrown, only sustaining bruises.
- March 1, 1874 – A tornado was observed in Tehama County causing roof damage to a structure, and demolishing a small outhouse.
- April 17, 1874 – A tornado struck Los Angeles County, damaging orange, walnut, and olive trees.
- April 22, 1874 – A tornado struck Fort Yuma, causing roof damage to a store and smashed objects. In then crossed into Yuma Arizona.
- June 5, 1874 – A tornado struck Amador County, destroying fences, trees, and scattered hay. One tree was carried for a considerable distance.
- June 8, 1875 – A tornado damaged a mineshaft and a pipe in Butte County.
- April 9, 1876 – A tornado struck Tehama County, damaging large trees, fences, structures and other buildings.
- December 1, 1877 – A weak tornado struck Carpinteria in Santa Barbara County, destroying an unfinished building.
- January 16, 1878 – A small tornado struck Santa Barbara County, destroying a small barn.
- March 7, 1878 – A tornado struck San Joaquin County, lifting around 1,200 acres of wheat from a farm.
- June 11, 1878 – A tornado struck Stanislaus County, overturning buggies from a ranch.
- December 31, 1878 – A waterspout came ashore Santa Barbara County; it had a width 300 yd (270 m), damaging an Italian garden, fences and an adobe. The tornado then traveled with a 2.25 mi (3.62 km) track, damaging a school, fences, dozens of trees, light frame house building and other objects. The tornado then unroofed a hay barn and caused other destruction. It then traveled to a house, three people attempted to escape, this resulted in the death of one person and the other two were injured. The tornado left a significant path of destruction in the town, this is the only significant tornado to ever strike Santa Barbara.
- November 11, 1879 – A tornado touched down in Tehama County, uprooting dozens of trees and damaged telephone poles and a church.
- December 10, 1879 – A tornado damaged a wagon-box header and destroyed it in Shasta Valley in Siskiyou County.
- April 22, 1880 – A small and weak tornado struck lower Oakland in Almenda County around 8:30 pm, the tornado damaged fences and sidewalks, lumber was also carried by the wind. A nine year old girl was carried by the wind and thrown into fences, bruising her arm. Another person was injured; it caused more damage to other buildings and property.
- May 21, 1880 – A tornado struck Folsom in Sacramento County, causing roof damage to a Railroad Machine Shop as well as pipes, telegraph lines and a tree before dissipating.
- May 26, 1880 – Two tornadoes struck the state. The first touched down at Chapmantown in Butte County, destroying an unfinished barn. The second struck Butte County, destroying a barn.
- November 30, 1880 – A tornado struck Modoc County, overturning a stagecoach, injuring four people seriously. One person had broken legs, another had a broken nose, one was carried for a significant distance, sustaining bruises, and the last one suffered a broken arm.
- February 23, 1887 – A tornado struck Oroville in Butte County, hurling everything for six miles while destroying cabins and fences.
- December 14, 1887 – A devasting tornado struck the community of La Crescenta in Los Angeles County, the storm completely destroyed a hotel, killing two occupants and leaving 14 badly injured.
- December 19, 1891 – A tornado struck San Francisco at Gough Street around 8 am, the tornado completely demolished a two story building. A man was killed by falling debris and three people escaped with slight injuries. This is San Francisco's only "significant" tornado.
- March 30, 1892 – A tornado struck west of Chico in Butte County, scattering debris and water from a creek, it also ripped branches from oak trees.
- December 11, 1894 – A tornado struck West of Berkeley in Alameda County, tearing the roof of a soap shop and doing slight damage to a mill. One woman was injured when a timber struck her in the soap shop; she wasn't seriously hurt. The mill was demolished shortly before the twister dissipated.
- January 16, 1895 – A tornado struck San Miguel in San Luis Obispo County, overturning a buggy and carried a tree. Unfortunately, the tree and the buggy broke the limbs of the driver, killing him instantly. A stage was overturned and telegraph poles were thrown into the ground.
- October 3, 1898 – An F2 tornado struck San Joaquin County, destroying a home.
- December 9, 1898 – A waterspout off San Diego moved ashore near Mount Soledad, which damaged vegetation and exposed rock along the mountain's southern slope. It was the first recorded tornado event in that area of California.

=== 1900-1949 ===
FU	F0	F1	F2	F3	F4	F5	Total
20	?	1	9	?	?	?	30
Deaths: 8				Injuries: 84+			

- December 15, 1900 – A tornado struck Salinas in Monterey County for around 10 minutes, causing "considerable" property damage, killing one woman. The storm traveled with intense nature in San Miguel Canyon, blowing down oil derricks and uprooting a score of trees, and blowing off a roof from a large warehouse, a man was lifted from a building and thrown, resulting in his death.
- February 26, 1902 – A tornado struck near Turlock County, with a width of 100 yd (91 m), the tornado damaged outbuildings and barns; some barns were swept. Orchards were uprooted and several homes were unroofed. Tons of almond and chard trees were either uprooted or blown. A large barn was destroyed.
- April 20, 1905 – A tornado struck 4 miles south of Visalia in Tulare County, a ton of orchards were leveled. A small house and a barn were lifted 100 feet in the air and torn apart in all directions, the family of the house were able to take cover in a ditch, avoiding death or injuries. This may have been the strongest tornado in California.
- January 27, 1908 – A waterspout came ashore Long Beach in Los Angeles County, lifting a barn and carrying it for 300 feet and a cow, while also uprooting trees and damaging houses.
- July 15, 1911 – A tornado struck El Centro in Imperial County. A church and a warehouse were demolished while other buildings were destroyed or had minor damage. Two men died in the St. Thomas hospital after they were fatally injured by the destruction of the warehouse. Seven more were injured badly, including two that suffered broken legs from a restaurant that had its walls collapsed, a man was cut in the head and face, one person was buried beneath debris, and three Hindus were injured from falling debris. More people were injured, but they were non-serious. This tornado caused at least $30,000 in damage.
- January 26, 1918 – A small F2 tornado touched down in Pasadena in Los Angeles County. Taking a 2 mi (3.2 km) track, it destroyed one house and damaged six buildings.
- October 26, 1921 – An F2 tornado stuck Sacramento County, injuring five people. The tornado also damaged at least 35 homes, including two that collapsed and two that lost their roofs.
- September 1, 1922 – A tornado struck Needles in San Bernardino County, blowing several houses off their foundations and damaging a tree.
- August 11, 1925 – A tornado struck Rockwood in Imperial County, damaging a total of 20 structures while injuring five people. luckily, these injuries were minor.
- April 5, 1926 – Three F2 tornadoes touched down across the state. The first was a waterspout that came ashore at Santa Monica in Los Angeles County, which damaged the roofs of three homes. The second F2 tornado struck San Joaquin County, which injured one person and damaged two buildings. The third was a waterspout that came ashore National City in San Diego County, the tornado destroyed 21 homes; this made it the costliest tornado on record in the county. The tornado also injured 18 people, and resulted in power outages. It caused at least $100,000 in damage.
- February 15, 1927 – Two tornadoes struck the state, the first hit Taft in Kern County, tearing off the roofs of several buildings, Including a theater and a boxing arena, injuring one man. Many trees were uprooted. The second hit Watsonville in Santa Cruz County, tearing a home from its foundation.
- February 16, 1927 – A tornado struck Contra Costa County, tearing frame buildings from their foundations and damaging telephone and power services. One power pole crashed onto a truck, injuring two men, one likely fatally.
- August 29, 1927 – An intense tornado struck Brawley in Imperial County, tearing a small home to pieces. A mother and her child were killed and one man was injured, requiring hospitalization.
- November 14, 1928 – A garage lost its roof and trees were uprooted after a small tornado struck Orana four miles south of Anaheim in Orange County.
- August 30, 1929 – A tornado struck the community of Bard in Imperial County near the Arizona Border, leveling several buildings and trees. The tornado may have crossed into Arizona.
- March 15, 1930 – An F2 tornado struck Hawthorne, Lawndale, and Lennox in Los Angeles County, injuring seven people after damaging a factory, the tornado also damaged 150 homes.
- January 12, 1933 – This may have been the most devastating tornado in the west coast. A tornado damaged several warships and around 250 oils derricks in San Pedro harbor in Los Angeles County; other utilities were damaged; it carried sand and buried the city with 3 inches of it. Two people were killed and 11 more people were known to be missing from the warships; they may have died. The tornado left $1.2 million in damage, making this one of the most destructive tornadoes in the county.
- February 11, 1935 – A tornado struck Pasadena, Sierra Madre, and Arcadia in Los Angeles County. A race track was unroofed, leaving $5,000 in damage and injuring 20 people, 15 were hospitalized for smashed fingers and cuts. Around Hollywood, the tornado damaged trees and glass from buildings, one car had serious damage when a tree fell onto it.
- February 12, 1936 – An F2 tornado struck Long Beach in Los Angeles County, injuring six people. The tornado also damaged two homes and blew down five oil derricks.
- July 5, 1936 – A powerful tornado struck Plaster City west of El Centro in Imperial County, several homes were demolished; dwellings had their roofs blown off and boxcars were derailed. A score of trees were uprooted and communication lines were damaged. The tornado traveled to Seeley destroying more homes, a cement plant also sustained damage.
- January 12, 1937 – A tornado injured four people in Los Angeles County after unroofing a railroad shed.
- February 1, 1938 – A waterspout came ashore Point Arena in Mendocino County, demolishing several barns and a warehouse. The twister also uprooted tons of trees. One man was injured, a cattle was carried by the wind.
- September 9, 1939 – There were two tornadoes in San Diego, which caused damage to a garage.
- April 9, 1941 – An F2 tornado struck Orland in Glenn County, causing an injury. The tornado destroyed barns and small buildings.
- November 11, 1944 – An F2 tornado struck Los Angeles County and San Bernardino. The tornado destroyed two barns and damaged walnut trees, with monetary damage estimated at $75,000.
- May 17, 1949 – A tornado was documented northwest of Fresno and officially rated F1 by the National Weather Service office in San Joaquin Valley, California.

=== 1950–1959 ===
FU	F0	F1	F2	F3	F4	F5	Total
12	3	4	7	0	0	0	28
Deaths: 3				Injuries: 37			

- April 8, 1950 – A possible tornado struck Los Angeles County; roofs were torn from large buildings and other buildings sustained damage due to flying debris. The tornado caused at least $10,000 in damage.
- January 11, 1951 – A severe cold front and a squall line produced straight line winds in Northern California, this storm also produced four tornadoes that hit the state. The first was a waterspout that came ashore on Dillion beach in Marin County becoming a tornado, the tornado moved to Two Rock in Sonoma County, the tornado severely damaged a ranch causing two injuries. The tornado caused roughly $18,000 in damage, the tornado also killed livestock. Several people, including the manager of the Anchor Bay Lumber witnessed a waterspout that came ashore at Richmond in Contra Cosa county becoming a tornado; it damaged planks in the lumber yard, some pieces of 4x4 planks were carried for over a mile, more damage occurred to other buildings. The tornado took a 2 mi (3.2 km) track to El Cerrito damaging 50 houses, a restaurant and cars had glass damage; chimneys; signs and trees were also knocked down. The third tornado was an F2 that struck the cities of Los Gatos and Sunnyvale, injuring 30 people. With a width of 880 yd (800 m), the tornado caused $1.5 million in damage. More than 250 homes were damaged, including 24 that lost their roofs or were torn from their foundations; nine families were left homeless. A 32-ton crane was lifted from the Southern Pacific Railroad Co. yards and hurled into a parking lot. The tornado also damaged businesses; two industrial plants, including the Westinghouse Electric Company plant were damaged heavily; one lost a roof entirely; more than 2000 workers were sent home due to the damage. A turbine shop also collapsed. Other buildings were completely destroyed in Sunnyvale. This was the most intense and destructive tornado in California, and it was considered to be "the third most damaging tornado of the year". The fourth tornado was an F2 that struck San Jose, which damaged hundreds of roofs, one house had some walls torn off. Multiple buildings and a dozen homes had their roofs torn off and had glass damage, a warehouse also collapsed. A man was injured when a flying plank struck him.
- March 16, 1952 – A "baby" tornado touched down in Santa Monica in Los Angeles County, killing three people. The tornado moved through a boatyard, damaging three boats and injuring a builder. The tornado also destroyed beach buildings, and caused damage to a garage which resulted in a car being damaged, and knocked down a chimney.
- December 20, 1952 – An unrated tornado struck near Santa Clarita.
- April 27, 1953 – An F2 tornado touched down in Modesto in Stanislaus County, causing $2,500 in damage.
- May 19, 1953 – An F2 tornado was on the ground for two miles (3.2 km) in Orland in Glenn County, causing $2,500 in damage.
- June 25, 1954 – An F2 tornado touched down northeast of Victorville in San Bernardino County.
- January 18, 1955 – An unrated tornado hit the Los Angeles neighborhood of West Adams.
- April 6, 1955 – An unrated tornado touched down near the Box Springs Mountains of Riverside County.
- April 18, 1955 – An unrated tornado was reported in rural eastern Merced County.
- April 13, 1956 – An F1 tornado struck Chula Vista in San Diego County, injuring two people from flying glass. The tornado severely damaged a school, and also damaged the roofs of 60 buildings.
- May 9, 1956 – An F0 tornado touched down in the El Sereno neighborhood of Los Angeles, injuring one person. The tornado caused $25,000 in damage.
- May 19, 1957 – An F1 tornado hit southwestern Fresno.
- January 19, 1958 – An F0 tornado struck Crescent City in Del Norte County.
- February 3, 1958 – An unrated tornado was reported in Gualala in Mendocino County.
- February 28, 1958 – An unrated tornado touched down in eastern Madera County.
- March 12, 1958 – An F0 tornado hit the city of Madera.
- March 29, 1958 – An F2 tornado was on the ground for about two miles (3.2 km) in McKinleyville in Humboldt County, leaving about $2,500 in damage.
- April 1, 1958 – There were three tornadoes across the state. The first was an unrated tornado near San Francisco International Airport in San Mateo County, which caused $25,000 in damage. An F1 tornado touched down near Delhi in northwestern Merced County. The last event of the day was an unrated tornado that touched down at Laguna Beach in Orange County.
- April 2, 1958 – A tornado destroyed a roof in the city of San Bernardino.
- May 22, 1958 – An F1 tornado touched down near Tule Lake in Siskiyou County, near California's border with Oregon.
- June 1, 1958 – A F2 tornado touched down in Marin County and took a 15-mile (24 km) path into Sonoma County, causing $25,000 in damage.
- February 17, 1959 – An unrated tornado was reported near Fort Ross State Historic Park in Sonoma County.
- May 3, 1959 – A tornado struck Naval Air Station North Island in San Diego County, which knocked down power lines and trees.

=== 1960–1969 ===
FU	F0	F1	F2	F3	F4	F5	Total
9	3	11	3	0	0	0	26
Injuries: 13

- May 13, 1960 – An unrated tornado uprooted trees north of Klamath in Del Norte County.
- October 8, 1961 – A series of ten waterspouts developed off Southern California, including one that moved ashore Oceanside in San Diego County to become an F1 tornado. The tornado ripped through fences, roofs, and homes, causing injuries to three people from flying glass.
- February 19, 1962 – There were two tornadoes across the Los Angeles area. The first was an F0 tornado that touched down for about six seconds in Santa Ana in Orange County, which damaged trees and utilities. The other was an F1 tornado in the Los Angeles neighborhood of Northridge, which destroyed a roof and affected utilities.
- March 22, 1962 – An F2 tornado struck Fresno, damaging a farm building.
- May 14, 1962 – An F1 tornado touched down twice in Gardena in Los Angeles County, destroying two buildings, and damaging the roof of an industrial building.
- January 21, 1964 – An F0 tornado hit Clovis in Fresno County, damaging several homes.
- November 1, 1964 – There was an unrated tornado near Alpaugh in Tulare County, which damaged a few farm buildings.
- November 9, 1964 – An F1 tornado hit El Segundo in Los Angeles County, which downed trees and power lines while also damaging a few buildings.
- November 10, 1964 – A tornado struck Windsor in Sonoma County, damaging billboards, utility lines, and homes.
- April 1, 1965 – An F1 tornado hit Corralitos in Santa Cruz County, affecting buildings and trees.
- April 8, 1965 – A tornado touched down in Costa Mesa in Orange County, which damaged trees and houses.
- July 5, 1965 – There were two tornadoes near Ogilby in Imperial County within a 45-minute period, one of which was rated an F1. The tornadoes knocked down power poles.
- November 25, 1965 – An F1 tornado struck Pomona in Los Angeles County, remaining on the ground for about two miles (3.2 km). The tornado destroyed several buildings and produced one-inch (2.5 cm) hail.
- July 22, 1966 – A tornado was reported by George Air Force Base in San Bernardino County.
- November 7, 1966 – There was an outbreak of four tornadoes across the Los Angeles area. The first moved through Newport Beach in Orange County, which damaged cars, boats, and roofs. An F2 tornado took a 10-mile (16 km) path through Los Angeles County, originating near Lawndale and tracking northeastward through Paramount. The tornado injured 10 people and left $250,000 in damage, with three schools losing their roofs. There was also an F2 tornado in Costa Mesa in Orange County, which damaged a few buildings, and an additional tornado that damaged a home in Willowbrook.
- April 18, 1967 – A waterspout moved ashore Santa Monica in Los Angeles County, becoming an F0 tornado, which damaged power lines and a few homes.
- April 21, 1967 – An F1 tornado touched down in the city of Madera, damaging a home and farms. While the tornado was officially rated as a F1, tornado researcher Thomas P. Grazulis rated the tornado as a F2.
- April 22, 1967 – There were two F1 tornadoes in the San Joaquin Valley reported by pilots – the first was observed near I-5 in western Fresno County, and the other was observed near Los Banos in Merced County.
- May 31, 1967 – An F1 tornado struck Stockton in San Joaquin County.
- October 16, 1969 – A pilot observed a tornado in San Joaquin County.

=== 1970–1979 ===
FU	F0	F1	F2	F3	F4	F5	Total
25	11	6	1	2	0	0	43
Injuries: 12

- April 27, 1970 – An F0 tornado struck French Camp in San Joaquin County at three locations, which knocked down trees onto cars.
- June 28, 1970 – An F1 tornado touched down near Gridley in Butte County, causing $25,000 in damage.
- February 23, 1971 – An F0 tornado hit Chula Vista near San Miguel Mountain, amid a series of funnel clouds across San Diego County.
- April 24, 1971 – An F0 tornado touched down near Stockton in San Joaquin County, damaging crops.
- June 7, 1972 – There was an F0 tornado near the Chocolate Mountain Aerial Gunnery Range in Imperial County.
- October 1, 1972 – An F0 tornado touched down in El Dorado County near Pacific amid storms that produced also produced three inches (7.6 cm) of hail.
- October 15, 1972 – There were two confirmed tornadoes, as well as several funnel clouds, across central California, including an F0 tornado in Yosemite National Park in Mariposa County, about 25 miles (40 km) northwest of Yosemite Valley. The other event of the day was an F0 tornado near Roseville in Placer County.
- October 19, 1972 – A weak tornado briefly touched down in Beaumont in Riverside County, while several other funnel clouds were observed that day.
- February 23, 1973 – There was a tornado near San Diego.
- August 16, 1973 – An F3 tornado hit Blythe in Riverside County, which moved a house off of its foundation, destroyed the roof of another house, and severely damaged a mobile home after moving it 50 feet (15 m). Although the event was one of only two F3 tornadoes recorded in the state, former National Weather Service officer Warren Blier stated that the damage suggested an intensity of a high-end F2.
- July 20, 1974 – An F1 tornado struck Hemet Airport in Riverside County, destroying eight aircraft and damaging nearby hangars. Flying glass injured one person.
- October 22, 1974 – An F1 tornado touched down northwest of Joshua Tree in San Bernardino County, damaging two homes.
- October 29, 1974 – A waterspout moved ashore Encinitas in San Diego County, becoming an F0 tornado, which destroyed a horse shelter.
- March 13, 1975 – An F0 tornado hit Fowler in Fresno County, which damaged a roof and moved a steel shed about 100 yards (91 m).
- April 5, 1975 – There were two F0 tornadoes in the state. The first touched down near Los Banos in Merced County, damaging homes and trees. The other tornado struck a lightly populated area of Fresno, causing minor damage to homes and sheds.
- September 4, 1976 – A tornado touched down on El Mirage Field in San Bernardino County, destroying a plane.
- September 5, 1976 – A tornado was reported in rural San Bernardino County.
- September 6, 1976 – There were four tornadoes across San Bernardino County, including three reported in an 11-minute period near El Mirage Field. There was also a tornado near Mount Baldy.
- January 3, 1977 – A waterspout moved ashore near Goleta in Santa Barbara County, damaging aircraft and power lines.
- March 16, 1977 – An F1 tornado touched down in Buena Park in Orange County, and took a 10.9-mile (17.5 km) path, injuring four people. The tornado caused $2.5 million in damage, affecting 80 homes.
- May 8, 1977 – A tornado took a three-mile (4.8 km) path through Long Beach in Los Angeles County, damaging several buildings; among them was a nursing home that lost its roof, forcing 50 patients to be evacuated.
- January 4, 1978 – A tornado touched down in San Dimas in Los Angeles County, in the foothills of the San Gabriel Mountains.
- January 5, 1978 – A tornado struck Costa Mesa in Orange County, which downed trees and power lines, causing some roofing damage.
- February 7, 1978 – An F2 tornado hit Rio Linda in Sacramento County, the tornado slightly damaged a elementary school causing a injury to a student and destroyed 2 barns. It caused $250,000 in damage.
- February 9, 1978 – A waterspout became an F3 tornado and struck Orange County; it was on the ground for about two miles (3.2 km). It moved through Huntington Beach, causing six injuries after demolishing 13 mobile homes and damaging 64 more, 400 people were left homeless. About 100 trees were uprooted and two homes were unroofed. Although the event was one of only two F3 tornadoes recorded in the state, former National Weather Service officer Warren Blier stated that the damage suggested an intensity of a high-end F2.
- February 10, 1978 – A tornado hit the city of El Segundo in Los Angeles County, which knocked down trees and power lines.
- March 4, 1978 – There were three tornadoes across northern California. The first touched down northwest of Chico in Butte County. The second hit Waterford in Stanislaus County, which wrecked parts of a dairy farm. The last event of the day was an F1 tornado near Hilmar in Merced County, which caused one injury and damaged several homes and destroyed two barn, leaving $250,000 in damage, Thomas P. Grazulis rated this tornado as a F2.
- March 5, 1978 – There was a small outbreak of three unrated tornadoes in Tehama County. One tornado struck Richfield, which knocked a tree onto a house and destroyed a camper. There was a tornado near Squall Hill, which destroyed a chicken coop and damaged a roof. There was also a tornado near Red Bluff, which destroyed a few farming buildings.
- March 23, 1978 – An unrated tornado was reported near Paradise in Butte County, causing $25,000 worth of damage.
- March 31, 1978 – An unrated tornado touched down near Stockton in San Joaquin County, which severely damaged a mobile home, and flipped two trucks onto their sides.
- August 7, 1978 – A tornado touched down along U.S. 6 north of Bishop in Inyo County, associated with a thunderstorm that formed within a dust cloud.
- December 19, 1978 – A waterspout moved ashore Oceanside in San Diego County, becoming a tornado, which injured three people. The tornado damaged trees, vehicles, and some businesses.
- January 5, 1979 – A waterspout moved ashore Mission Beach, San Diego, damaging several boats, including one that was lifted 50 feet (15 m) by the tornado.
- January 18, 1979 – An F0 tornado touched down in San Diego, affecting the neighborhoods of Midway and Tierrasanta. The tornado damaged sign posts and street lights.
- January 31, 1979 – There were two tornadoes in southern California. The first was an unrated tornado that hit the Los Angeles neighborhood of North Hollywood, with damage estimated at $2.5 million. There was also an F1 tornado that touched down in Santa Ana in Orange County, which resulted in power outages.
- March 14, 1979 – An unrated tornado hit Selma in Fresno County and was on the ground for two miles (3.2 km), causing $25,000 worth of damage.

=== 1980–1989 ===
FU	F0	F1	F2	F3	F4	F5	Total
2	33	17	8	0	0	0	60
Injuries: 41

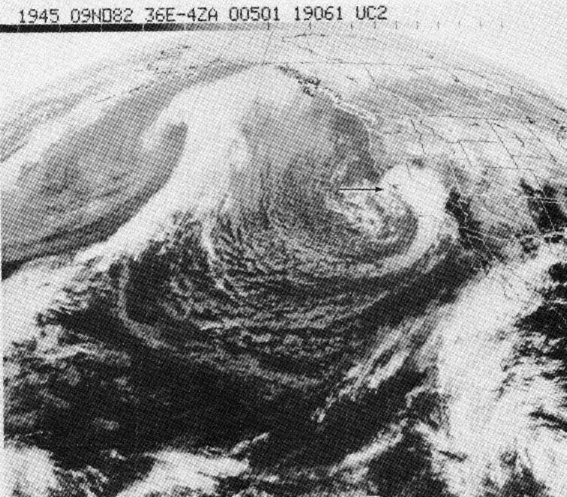
Infrared satellite imagery of the weather system that produced seven tornadoes across the state on November 9, 1982

- January 14, 1980 – There was an F1 tornado near Fremont in Alameda County, causing one injury, as well as $250,000 in damage.
- January 28, 1980 – An F0 tornado hit Gardena in Los Angeles County.
- February 15, 1980 – An F0 tornado touched down north of Dinuba in Tulare County, damaging a chicken barn.
- February 19, 1980 – An F1 tornado moved through Fresno Air Terminal and damaged a nearby hotel, two people were injured and the tornado left $2.5 million in damage.
- February 20, 1980 – An F1 tornado hit the Clairemont community of San Diego, resulting in $25,000 in damage.
- April 5, 1980 – An F2 tornado moved through Lemoore in Kings County, and was on the ground for 8.2 miles (13.2 km), causing one injury, as well as $250,000 in damage. It dissipated after crossing into Tulare County, becoming one of only two recorded F2 tornadoes to affect the central California interior, along with a tornado in 1962.
- May 9, 1980 – An F2 tornado struck Red Bluff in Tehama County, causing $25,000 in damage.
- July 29, 1980 – There was an unrated tornado in Rancho Calaveras in Calaveras County.
- January 22, 1981 – Two tornadoes hit the state, the first was an F0 tornado, which hit Chico in Butte County, causing light damage. The second tornado was reported in San Bernardino County.
- January 23, 1981 – An F0 tornado struck Stockton in San Joaquin County, with damage estimated at $25,000.
- March 19, 1981 – There was an F0 tornado in Peters in San Joaquin County, damaging several homes, trees, and TV antennae.
- January 20, 1982 – An F1 tornado touched down in the city of Riverside, which severely damaged a home due to a downed tree.
- March 17, 1982 – An F0 tornado hit the San Diego neighborhood of Loma Portal, ripping off the roof of a home.
- March 28, 1982 – An F1 tornado touched down in Selma in Fresno County, which moved southeastward on an intermittent 5 mi (8.0 km) path near and along SR 99. The tornado caused one injury, and also damaged a roof and some trees.
- March 29, 1982 – There were two F1 tornadoes in the state. The first hit the city of Livermore in Alameda County, which overturned two cars. The other tornado struck San Gabriel in Los Angeles County, which downed trees, power lines, and fences across a two block area.
- June 29, 1982 – An F0 tornado touched down twice in open farmlands in northwestern San Joaquin County.
- September 7, 1982 – An F2 tornado struck Yucca Valley in San Bernardino County, injuring two people, and leaving $25,000 in damage.
- November 9, 1982 – A cold front spawned seven tornadoes across California, setting a record for the most tornadoes in the state on a given day. Three of the tornadoes were waterspouts that moved ashore, including the first event of the day, which was a waterspout that became an F1 tornado in Malibu in Los Angeles County. It lifted a catamaran 125 feet (38 m) into the air, and damaged a few homes. The next tornado was an F2 that damaged a city block in the Los Angeles neighborhood of Van Nuys, which severely damaged a department store, resulting in nearly $250,000 in damage. There was a brief F1 tornado that damaged power lines at Saddleback College in Mission Viejo in Orange County. A waterspout made landfall at the Port of Long Beach and continued inland for 10 miles (16 km) as an F2 tornado, which damaged homes and buildings and uprooted about 300 trees, the tornado had a width of 1,300 yd (1,200 m), making this one of the largest tornadoes ever recorded in the state. An F1 tornado touched down in Garden Grove in Orange County, affecting a few trees and roofs. There was a waterspout that moved ashore Point Mugu in Ventura County, becoming a brief F0 tornado. An F0 tornado also moved through Inglewood, damaging trees and roofs.
- February 27, 1983 – An F1 tornado touched down near Santa Rosa in Sonoma County, damaging three homes, one of which lost its entire roof.

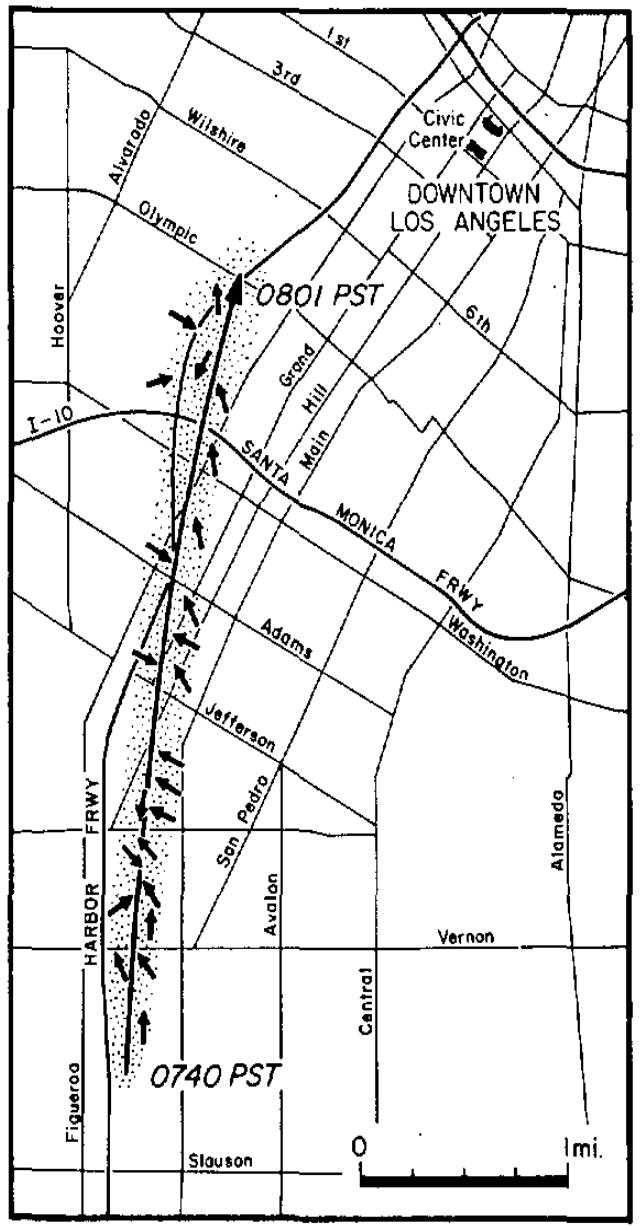
Track of the South Central Los Angeles tornado of March 1, 1983

- March 1, 1983 – An F2 tornado touched down in South Los Angeles, damaging 57 buildings, including the Los Angeles Convention Center. At least 30 people were injured as most of the injuries were from flying glass. Only 14 minutes after the tornado dissipated, an F0 touched down in San Marino in Los Angeles County.
- March 3, 1983 – An F0 tornado struck Roseville in Placer County.
- March 22, 1983 – An F1 touched down three times along an intermittent one-mile (1.6 km) path through northern Sacramento into southern Placer County, resulting in $250,000 in damage.
- August 1, 1983 – An F0 tornado struck Landers in San Bernardino County, damaging three houses and causing one injury.
- August 18, 1983 – A tornado hit the Los Angeles area.
- September 30, 1983 – An F0 tornado touched down in the Los Angeles neighborhood of Walnut Park, which destroyed the front porch of a house, while also damaging roofs and windows of homes along the 0.25-mile (0.40 km) path.
- October 1, 1983 – An F2 tornado hit Hawthorne in Los Angeles County, which injured three people, and damaged 68 homes, including four that were left uninhabitable. The tornado knocked down trees and power lines, damaging 36 cars.
- December 11, 1983 – An F0 tornado was on the ground for two miles (3.2 km) in Ukiah in Mendocino County.
- January 13, 1984 – An F0 tornado hit Huntington Beach in Orange County, damaging a mobile home.
- May 30, 1984 – An F0 tornado uprooted several trees at the San Dimas golf course in Los Angeles County.
- February 4, 1985 – A series of funnel clouds were reported across San Diego County, including one that touched down in Mission Trails Regional Park, which damaged roofs and awnings at a mobile home park.
- March 11, 1985 – An F2 tornado struck Hollister in San Benito County, which damaged a few agriculture buildings.
- September 18, 1985 – A brief F0 tornado touched down near the north shore of the Salton Sea in Riverside County.
- November 12, 1985 – A waterspout moved ashore Encinitas in San Diego County, becoming a tornado. It caused about $250,000 worth of damage, including a roof blown onto a car, about 40 damaged or destroyed greenhouses, as well as downed trees.
- February 3, 1986 – A waterspout moved ashore Rio del Mar in Santa Cruz County as an F0 tornado.
- February 15, 1986 – An F0 tornado struck a mobile home park in Dinuba in Tulare County, damaging roofs and landscaping.
- February 19, 1986 – A brief F0 tornado touched down in Le Grand in Merced County, causing minor property damage.
- March 8, 1986 – An F1 tornado hit Selma in Fresno County, remaining on the ground for about four miles (6.4 km) before lifting.
- March 10, 1986 – A waterspout moved ashore Moss Beach in San Mateo County, becoming an F0 tornado, which flipped over a car and damaged a restaurant.
- March 16, 1986 – An F1 tornado struck Anaheim in Orange County, flipping over two trucks and damaging the roofs of eight buildings, with trees and windows also damaged.
- July 21, 1986 – An F0 tornado touched down for about three minutes on a hillside south of Barstow in San Bernardino County.
- September 24, 1986 – An area of thunderstorms in the Sacramento Valley spawned an F2 tornado in Vina in Tehama County, which destroyed a mobile home, injuring a man. The tornado also damaged 11 other buildings, as well as about 50 acres (20 ha) of walnut orchards.
- March 14, 1987 – There was a small F0 tornado in Flournoy in Tehama County.
- April 3, 1987 – An F0 tornado touched down at a greenhouse near Salinas in Monterey County.
- June 5, 1987 – A microburst moved through Lancaster in northern Los Angeles County, which spawned an F0 tornado. Strong winds from the broader system destroyed a trailer park, and also knocked down many power lines, leaving 500,000 people without power.
- July 27, 1987 – An F0 tornado took a 1.5-mile (2.4 km) path through Twentynine Palms in San Bernardino County.
- September 1, 1987 – Thunderstorms in San Diego County produced a possible tornado or microburst, which downed a tree and damaged mobile homes near Lake Jennings.
- January 18, 1988 – There were two F0 tornadoes in Orange County. The first hit San Clemente, lifting a dugout 15 feet (4.6 m) in the air. The other touched down in Coto de Caza, damaging a few homes.
- March 1, 1988 – An F0 tornado struck Orosi in Tulare County.
- April 19, 1988 – A passing cold front spawned two F1 tornadoes. The first touched down in Lockeford in San Joaquin County, which was strong enough to blow a trailer into a ravine. The other tornado hit Folsom in Sacramento County, which damaged 46 homes.
- April 29, 1988 – An F0 tornado touched down near Bear Mountain in Kern County.
- March 2, 1989 – Several funnel clouds developed along a cold front, including one that developed into an F0 tornado that touched down in the city of Fresno, destroying a shed.
- September 18, 1989 – There were two F0 tornadoes across the state – one touched down in Concord, and the other in Davis in Yolo County.

=== 1990–1999 ===
FU	F0	F1	F2	F3	F4	F5	Total
3	76	38	2	0	0	0	117
Injuries: 18

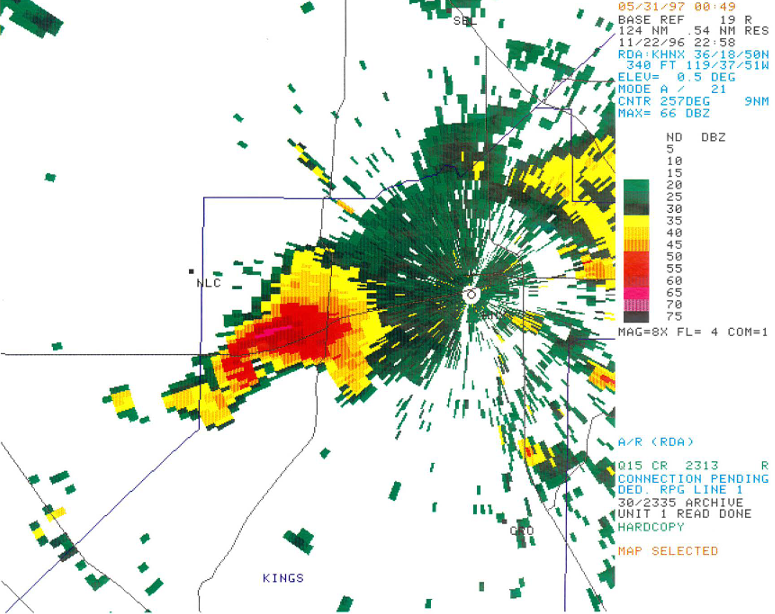
Reflectivity scan of an F1 tornado over Lemoore Naval Air Station in November 1996

- January 14, 1990 – An F0 tornado hit San Diego County.
- January 16, 1990 – An F0 tornado touched down at two different locations in Pico Rivera in Los Angeles County, causing damage to nine houses plus several trees.
- April 23, 1990 – There was an F0 tornado in Placer County northeast of Sacramento.
- August 14, 1990 – An F0 tornado touched down in San Bernardino County east of Barstow.
- September 29, 1990 – An F0 tornado touched down in San Bernardino County near Daggett.
- February 28, 1991 – There were two tornadoes across the state. The first was an F0 that hit Tustin in Orange County and crossed into Irvine, damaging 40 houses. The other was an F1 that struck Goshen in Tulare County, which injured a person and left $250,000 in damage.
- March 17, 1991 – An F1 tornado hit Taft in Kern County, with damage estimated at $250,000.
- March 19, 1991 – There were three tornadoes across the state, including two in San Diego County. The first was an F0 that touched down in Lakewood in Los Angeles County. The tornado lifted a car and damaged windows and roofs. There was an F1 that hit the San Diego neighborhood of San Carlos, which caused $250,000 worth of damage to houses and trees. A tornado also touched down in City Heights.
- March 20, 1991 – There were four F0 tornadoes across the state. The first hit the city of Riverside, and about one hour and 15 minutes later, another struck the city of San Bernardino. A waterspout moved ashore Camp Pendleton in San Diego County. A tornado touched down in a rural area of western Madera County.
- March 25, 1991 – The China Lake Naval station reported an F1 tornado in Kern County.
- March 26, 1991 – There were four tornadoes across the state, along with several funnel clouds. The first touched down in open desert of Kern County, which was confirmed as an F0 by the scattering of tumbleweeds. The next F0 tornado touched down just east of I-5 in San Joaquin County. An F0 tornado struck a rural area of southeastern Merced County. A tornado affected Vandenberg Space Force Base in Santa Barbara County.
- March 27, 1991 – There were two F1 tornadoes across the state. The first had an intermittent three-mile (4.8 km) path through Huntington Beach in Orange County, which damaged a mobile home park, along with fences and trees. The other tornado hit San Marcos in northern San Diego County, and was strong enough to lift a shed from one yard to another.
- October 12, 1991 – An F0 tornado touched down in a rural area of Kings County.
- December 29, 1991 – An F0 tornado touched down near Lompoc in Santa Barbara County, which injured two people.
- February 15, 1992 – An F0 tornado hit a trailer park at Camp Pendleton in San Diego County, moving one home off its base and damaging several tree limbs.
- March 20, 1992 – An F1 tornado touched down in the Los Angeles neighborhood of El Sereno, which damaged about 10 houses, and knocked a billboard onto a car.
- May 5, 1992 – An F0 tornado struck the city of Imperial, causing $2.5 million worth of damage to warehouses.
- December 2, 1992 – There were three F1 tornadoes in Sonoma County west of Santa Rosa, which downed trees and damaged roofs.
- December 6, 1992 – There were two F1 tornadoes in Monterey County – one in Carmel and the other in the city of Monterey. The tornadoes injured two people from flying glass, and also damaged Del Monte Golf Course.
- December 7, 1992 – There were four tornadoes across the state. The first was an F0 tornado in Moorpark in Ventura County, which uprooted 20 trees. The next two tornadoes were rated an F1, and both touched down in Orange County. One hit Westminster, destroying three mobile homes and knocking down power lines and fences. The other F1 in the county struck Anaheim, which flipped over several cars and damaged nearby roofs and trees. The last tornado of the day was a waterspout that moved ashore Carlsbad in San Diego County, which damaged three carports at a mobile home park.
- December 11, 1992 – There were three tornadoes across the state. The first was an F1 tornado in Crescent City in Del Norte County, which damaged the roof of the sheriff's office, as well as nearby cars and power lines. The next was an F0 that touched down at Fort Ord Dunes State Park, damaging a fence. The last tornado of the day was an F0 that touched down in a vineyard near Easton in Fresno County.
- December 17, 1992 – There were three tornadoes across Northern California, related to a cold front. The first was an F0 in San Leandro in Alameda County. The second was an F1 tornado that struck Oroville in Butte County, which damaged 56 buildings, with four people injured. Damage was estimated at $2.5 million. The last tornado of the day was an F1 that hit Loma Rica in Yuba County, which uprooted trees and damaged a barn.
- December 29, 1992 – An F0 tornado moved through San Clemente in Orange County, downing a grove of trees.
- December 30, 1992 – An F1 tornado touched down in Crescent City in Del Norte County, destroying a utility shed and damaging nearby trees and fences.
- January 7, 1993 – An F1 tornado struck Biggs in Butte County, which damaged a barn and two vehicles.
- January 14, 1993 – An F1 tornado took a two-mile (3.2 km) path through Los Angeles, uprooting 50 trees and damaging three houses.
- January 17, 1993 – There were two F0 tornadoes in the state. The first moved through a residential neighborhood of Lake Forest in Orange County, which damaged 31 homes and caused an injury, resulting in $5 million in damage. The other was in Los Angeles County, which downed a few trees and power lines.
- January 18, 1993 – There was an F0 tornado in Huntington Beach in Orange County, damaging six homes.
- February 8, 1993 – An F0 tornado moved through a car dealership in Brea in Orange County, damaging five cars and a roof.
- February 19, 1993 – An F0 tornado knocked down a power pole in Tipton in Tulare County.
- February 23, 1993 – An F0 tornado was on the ground intermittently for 15 minutes between Wasco and McFarland in Kern County, which destroyed a carport.
- April 17, 1993 – There were two tornadoes in the state. The first was an F1 tornado that struck a rural area near Willows in Glenn County, which destroyed three farming buildings. The other tornado was rated an F0, which touched down in Chico in Butte County, downing several trees.
- August 29, 1993 – An F1 tornado hit Calipatria in Imperial County, damaging a school as well as a few power lines.
- November 11, 1993 – A small F0 tornado touched down in the Portola Hills neighborhood of Orange County. The tornado overturned a mobile home, injuring two people.
- February 7, 1994 – There were two F0 tornadoes in the state. The first hit the Los Angeles neighborhood of Sun Valley, which downed a few trees, one of which smashed a car. The other lasted for 75 minutes and a path of nine miles (14 km) through Orange County. The tornado touched down near Newport Beach and eventually dissipated near Marine Corps Air Station Tustin, after damaging roofs, trees, and windows.
- February 10, 1994 – An F2 tornado struck Oroville in Butte County, destroying a home and damaging 47 others, with $5 million in damage. Two people sustained injuries from the tornado.
- March 5, 1994 – An F0 tornado was on the ground briefly in Lemoore in Kings County. Its parent thunderstorm produced high winds and hail that caused $6 million in crop damage.
- March 10, 1994 – There was an F0 tornado in Oroville in Butte County, which knocked down fences and trees, damaging a few houses.
- March 24, 1994 – An F0 tornado in Santa Barbara lifted up a building over a fence.
- April 25, 1994 – There were two F0 tornadoes across the state. The first crossed through a residential subdivision in Livermore in Alameda County, which damaged a few houses and trees. The other was in southern Butte County.
- August 12, 1994 – An F0 tornado hit Valle Vista in Riverside County, which destroyed a trailer and damaged a few homes.
- May 1, 1995 – A brief F0 tornado touched down near the Fresno Fairgrounds, damaging a roof and a car.
- May 13, 1995 – There were two tornadoes in the state. The first was an F0 that struck the Porterville Municipal Airport in Tulare County, which destroyed two aircraft and caused damage to the roof and fences. The other was an F0 in rural Fresno County, which damaged a few tree limbs and some roofing.
- June 16, 1995 – An F0 tornado touched down in Whittier in Los Angeles County, which damaged a rain gutter and snapped tree branches.
- June 26, 1995 – An F0 tornado hit an open field in rural Kern County.
- January 20, 1996 – Two waterspouts moved ashore Del Norte County, near the state's border with Oregon. The first was an F0 that hit Smith River, which downed dozens of trees, one of which damaged a house porch. The other was an F0 that hit Crescent City, which damaged a fence.
- February 22, 1996 – An F1 tornado touched down in Larkfield in Sonoma County, shredding a roof and several trees.
- March 12, 1996 – There were two tornadoes near Hanford in Kings County within a 30-minute period, both ranked as an F0. The first destroyed a barn building. The other knocked down several trees and fences.
- April 1, 1996 – There was an outbreak of five tornadoes across the state. The first was an F0 near Newman in Stanislaus County, which damaged a fence and a sign near a high school. An F0 tornado hit the city of Lodi in San Joaquin County, which knocked a tree into a home. An F0 tornado struck a golf course in Stockton in San Joaquin, downing several trees. There was a brief tornado near El Nido in Merced County which damaged a power pole. The last event of the day was a rope tornado that touched down near Tulare in the county of the same name, which damaged windows and roofs.
- April 16, 1996 – A small F0 touched down in Fresno County.
- October 30, 1996 – An F0 tornado hit the city of Fresno, damaging crop fields.
- November 22, 1996 – There was an outbreak of four tornadoes across the state related to a cold front. The first was an F1 that hit the city of Merced, which destroyed the roof of a garage. A supercell developed in Kings County and moved over the Lemoore Naval Air Station, first producing an F0 tornado that remained over fields. A half hour later, the same supercell spawned an F1 tornado that moved across the southeastern portion of the base, dissipating near the main gate. The tornado damaged roofs, windows, power lines, and aircraft along its 0.8-mile (1.3 km) path. The last tornado of the day touched down in a field near Bakersfield in Kern County, rated an F0.
- December 12, 1996 – An F1 tornado struck Oakdale in Stanislaus County, which damaged a roof, garage, and animal pen, killing a calf.
- December 22, 1996 – An F1 tornado hit Cabazon in Riverside County, damaging six mobile homes, including one that was moved 30 feet (9.1 m).
- December 23, 1996 – There were two tornadoes in the San Francisco area. The first was a waterspout that moved ashore Tomales in Marin County, becoming an F1 tornado that remained on the ground for six miles (9.7 km). It destroyed a large barn and knocked down power lines and trees. The other tornado was an F0 in Solano County, which injured a jogger who was flung into a fence.
- January 20, 1997 – An F0 tornado hit Exeter in Tulare County, causing damage to trees, roofs, and power lines, resulting in a brief power outage.
- February 22, 1997 – Thunderstorms spawned an F0 tornado that struck Bakersfield in Kern County, with a short and narrow path. The thunderstorms caused a fatality when a vehicle overturned on wet roads.
- March 22, 1997 – There was a brief F0 tornado that touched down in rural Kern County, west of McFarland.
- May 11, 1997 – An F1 tornado struck Apple Valley in San Bernardino County, with one roof destroyed and several downed power lines.
- May 18, 1997 – Thunderstorms spawned two short-lived tornadoes near Apple Valley in San Bernardino County, associated with the same microburst. The first, rated an F1, destroyed a few structures while moving along 3.5 miles (5.6 km) of generally open field. The other tornado dissipated while the first was forming, and was also rated an F1, with damaging consisting of a destroyed garage and some downed power lines.
- May 20, 1997 – There was a brief landspout that touched down near Borrego Springs in the desert of San Diego County.
- June 6, 1997 – An F0 tornado destroyed a fountain in Hesperia in San Bernardino County.
- July 21, 1997 – A small and weak F0 tornado touched down east of Palmdale in Los Angeles County.
- August 7, 1997 – There was a brief F0 tornado in rural San Bernardino County south of Needles.
- September 24, 1997 – An F0 tornado knocked down power poles near Seeley in Imperial County, with several trees and outhouses also affected.
- November 11, 1997 – An F1 tornado struck Irvine in Orange County, damaging ten cars from flying debris.
- November 13, 1997 – A brief F0 tornado touched down in a rural area near Los Banos in Merced County, damaging farming equipment.
- November 26, 1997 – A line of thunderstorms spawned two weak tornadoes near Fresno. The first was a gustnado which damaged a few roofs and trees near Clovis. The other was a weak F0, which knocked down a few fences.
- December 8, 1997 – A weak tornado briefly touched down in a trailer park in San Jose in Santa Clara County.
- December 21, 1997 – A waterspout moved ashore Huntington Beach in Orange County, becoming an F1 tornado, strong enough to damage trees and roofs. The tornado crossed the Pacific Coast Highway and Huntington Harbor, where it ripped six boats from their moorings.
- January 9, 1998 – An F1 tornado hit Long Beach in Los Angeles County, damaging the roof of a supermarket and an elementary school. One person was injured.
- January 29, 1998 – A waterspout moved ashore Encinitas in San Diego County, becoming an F1 tornado. It damaged several businesses and vehicles.
- February 6, 1998 – An F0 tornado struck down and damaged a Lockheed Martin plant in Sunnyvale in Santa Clara County, with the monetary cost estimated at $100,000.
- February 9, 1998 – An F0 tornado hit Cardiff in San Diego County, which downed a few trees and overturned a shack.
- February 14, 1998 – There were two tornadoes in the state. An F0 tornado was on the ground in rural Merced County. The other was an F1 which struck Firebaugh in Fresno County, damaging windows, roofs, and trees.
- February 19, 1998 – An F0 tornado touched down in Brentwood in Contra Costa County, which damaged power lines, a carport, and a plant nursery.
- February 24, 1998 – A winter storm spawned a F0 tornado at a trailer park in Huntington Beach in Orange County. The tornado damaged several properties and power lines, leaving 200 people without electricity.
- March 24, 1998 – An F0 tornado touched down in extreme northern Madera County, and was on the ground for about 10 minutes, dissipating southwest of Chowchilla. It damaged a few trees and phone lines.
- March 28, 1998 – There were two tornadoes in central California. The first was an F0 that struck Chowchilla Airport in Madera County, which blew two belt loaders 25 feet (7.6 m). The tornado dropped pea-sized hail, which accumulated to two inches (51 mm). The other tornado of the day was an F0 near Tracy in San Joaquin County, which ripped up 60 feet (18 m) of fence.
- April 24, 1998 – An F0 tornado hit a shopping mall near Sacramento, damaging two cars and a tree.
- May 5, 1998 – There was an outbreak of three tornadoes across two counties. The first was an F0 in the town of San Luis Obispo in the county of the same name. It damaged four homes and knocked out power to hundreds of buildings. The next tornado was an F1 that touched down near Los Altos High School in Santa Clara County, injuring a tennis coach. The last tornado was an F2 which struck Sunnyvale in the same county, resulting in one injury, with $3.68 million worth of damage to 16 buildings.
- May 12, 1998 – There was a brief F0 tornado that touched down in some marshlands near Travis Air Force Base in Solano County.
- May 13, 1998 – There were two tornadoes in southern California, related to the same cold front that produced snowfall in the southern California mountains. An F0 tornado was reported southeast of Camarillo Airport in Ventura County. There was also an F0 tornado near Homeland in Riverside County.
- May 16, 1998 –– An F0 tornado touched down near Richvale in Butte County.
- August 25, 1998 – An F0 tornado hit northeastern San Bernardino County, damaging a dump truck and sweeping away a truck along I-15 to the southwest of Nipton.
- December 5, 1998 – There was an outbreak of four tornadoes across northern and central California. The first was an F1 that touched down in Fort Bragg in Mendocino County, which damaged several trees and buildings, including a court house. Another F1 tornado hit the city of Santa Rosa in Sonoma County, causing $1 million in damage. An F0 tornado hit the city of Richmond in Contra Costa County, in the San Francisco Bay Area, causing $200,000 in damage. The fourth and final tornado of the day was an F0 that touched down in Santa Cruz in the county of the same name, causing $50,000 in damage.
- April 1, 1999 – A small F0 tornado touched down in Chatsworth, Los Angeles, damaging two mobile homes.
- April 3, 1999 – A brief F0 tornado hit southeastern Bakersfield in Kern County, which knocked down a few trees and damaged a shed.
- July 12, 1999 – An F0 tornado struck Anza-Borrego Desert State Park in San Diego County, with winds of 43 mph (69 km/h) reported by an anemometer. The tornado destroyed a water tower and a building that was under construction, with some damage to four other buildings and a few felled trees.

=== 2000–2009 ===
FU	F0	F1	F2	F3	F4	F5	Total
0	44	9	0	0	0	0	53

- February 16, 2000 – A brief F0 tornado damaged four mobile homes in Covina in Los Angeles County.
- February 27, 2000 – A line of thunderstorms produced four weak tornadoes in the San Joaquin Valley. The first of the four touched down in rural Madera County, remaining on the ground for about ten minutes. The other tornadoes were all in Fresno County, the first of which knocked down a few almond trees in a rural area southwest of Kerman. There was a short-lived F0 tornado in a field near Caruthers, as well as a brief tornado near the county dump south of Fresno.
- July 5, 2000 – A brief rope tornado was reported near Artois in Glenn County.
- August 28, 2000 – A brief F0 tornado touched down in the Antelope Valley of northern Los Angeles County.
- August 30, 2000 – An F0 tornado was reported near Glamis in Imperial County.
- November 10, 2000 – An F1 tornado touched down in Poway in San Diego County, remaining on the ground for about three minutes. It moved two vehicles, uprooted two trees, and caused damage to roofs and fences.
- April 7, 2001 – An F0 tornado briefly touched down in Clovis in Fresno County, causing minor damage.
- July 7, 2001 – An F0 tornado hit Joshua Tree in San Bernardino County, damaging a few buildings.
- November 29, 2001 – An F0 tornado touched down in Santa Maria in Santa Barbara County, damaging three homes.
- December 20, 2001 – An F1 tornado struck Watsonville in Santa Cruz County, destroying a greenhouse and causing damage to power lines and trees.
- December 21, 2001 – An F0 tornado touched down in Walnut in eastern Los Angeles County, knocking down around 30 trees and damaging several homes.
- May 20, 2002 – An F1 tornado hit a farm in Madera County, downing several trees. It was on the ground for 2.675 miles (4.305 km).
- December 16, 2002 – A supercell generated two tornadoes near Merced. The first was an F1 which damaged a few roofs and carports, remaining on the ground for about five minutes. Five minutes later, an F0 hit a rural area nearby.
- February 2, 2004 – A waterspout moved ashore Oceano in San Luis Obispo County, becoming a short-lived F0 tornado.
- July 7, 2004 – An F0 tornado touched down near Kern River Canyon in Sequoia National Park in eastern Tulare County at an altitude of around 12,156 ft (3,705 m); this made it the highest elevation for a confirmed tornado in the United States. The tornado remained nearly stationary, producing hail as it remained on the ground for about five minutes.
- August 14, 2004 – There were two short-lived F0 tornadoes in San Bernardino County, one northwest of Yucca Valley and the other near Phelan.
- October 17, 2004 – A waterspout moved ashore Oceanside in San Diego County, becoming an F0 tornado which was on the ground for about two minutes. The tornado damaged the roof of an elementary school, as well as trees and windows along its path.
- October 20, 2004 – A short-lived narrow F0 tornado touched down in a field near Dinuba in Tulare County, remaining nearly stationary before dissipating.
- December 28, 2004 – An F0 tornado touched down in Long Beach in Los Angeles County, causing minor damage to roofs and trees.
- December 29, 2004 – A winter storm spawned two short-lived weak tornadoes in Los Angeles County, one in Inglewood and the other in Whittier.
- January 8, 2005 – A brief F1 tornado hit south of Oroville in Butte County, damaging two buildings.
- January 9, 2005 – A brief F0 tornado lifted and tossed a storage shed near Hemet in Riverside County.
- January 10, 2005 – A weak short-lived F0 tornado struck El Rio in Ventura County.
- January 11, 2005 – A brief F0 tornado touched down in Vacaville in Solano County.
- January 27, 2005 – An F1 tornado destroyed a barn in Sonoma County, while also damaging two other barns and a house.
- February 19, 2005 – There were three tornadoes in Southern California. The first was a waterspout which moved ashore Huntington Beach in Orange County, damaging trees, power poles, and cars. A supercell spawned the other two tornadoes in San Diego County. An F0 touched down near Camp Pendleton, and was on the ground for seven minutes, causing damage to trees, roofs, and power lines. The other tornado was an F1 which touched down near Rainbow and crossed into Riverside County, where it knocked down over 100 trees and overturned a trailer on I-15.
- February 21, 2005 – There was an outbreak of three tornadoes across the Sacramento area that caused nearly $1 million in damage. The first was an F0 in West Sacramento in Yolo County, which damaged a few trees, and crossed I-80. The next tornado was an F0 in the Natomas neighborhood, which had a discontinuous 1.5-mile (2.4 km) path. It causing damage to roofs and fences. The last tornado in the event was an F0 that touched down in a rural part of Dunnigan in Yolo County.
- February 23, 2005 – An F0 tornado briefly touched down in Chula Vista in San Diego County.
- February 26, 2005 – A brief landspout occurred near Lake Elsinore in Riverside County.
- March 4, 2005 – A brief F0 tornado touched down in Fontana in San Bernardino County, damaging roofs, trees, and power lines.
- March 20, 2005 – An F1 tornado struck South San Francisco in San Mateo County, causing damage to 60 buildings along its three-mile (4.8 km) path.
- March 29, 2005 – A brief F0 tornado was on the ground for about a minute in Yuba City in Sutter County.
- April 8, 2005 – There was an outbreak of five F0 tornadoes across the state. The first tornado uprooted dozens of almond trees in Lathrop in San Joaquin County. The next tornado touched down over open fields in Sacramento County, and a half hour later, another tornado damaged a few buildings near the city of Sacramento. Meanwhile, another tornado touched down in Durham in Butte County, damaging a few buildings and trees. The final tornado of the day was on the ground for 1.2 miles (1.9 km) in Ballico in Merced County.
- May 9, 2005 – There were two F0 tornadoes. The first touched down near Fowler in Fresno County. The other hit Yuba City in Sutter County, uprooting trees and damaging three buildings.
- June 6, 2005 – There was a brief F0 tornado near Artois in Glenn County.
- July 23, 2005 – A thunderstorm developed near Lake Elsinore, spawning an F0 tornado near Hemet in Riverside County. It remained on the ground for about 15 minutes, damaging several tree limbs.
- August 15, 2005 – A nearly-stationary F0 tornado remained on the ground for nine minutes near Palmdale in Los Angeles County.
- December 26, 2005 – A brief F0 tornado touched down in Tracy in San Joaquin County, damaging a few trees and roof shingles.
- January 14, 2006 – There was a brief F0 tornado in rural Mariposa County.
- March 10, 2006 – A waterspout moved ashore Encinitas in San Diego County, becoming an F0 tornado that knocked down a few trees and halted rail traffic.
- March 11, 2006 – A supercell produced a waterspout, and the same system spawned an F0 tornado near Ramona in San Diego County. It downed dozens of trees and damaged several homes.
- March 28, 2006 – There were three F0 tornadoes in the span of an hour in Merced County. The first touched down near Atwater and damaged a few roofs. Around the same time, there was another tornado near Merced which damaged the roof of a building, followed by another one striking the same city a half hour later.
- March 29, 2006 – An F0 tornado touched down near Lompoc in Santa Barbara County.
- April 14, 2006 – An F1 tornado hit Modesto in Stanislaus County, damaging a few roofs.
- July 26, 2006 – A landspout struck Menifee in Riverside County, knocking down dozens of trees, some of which fell onto homes.

EFU	EF0	EF1	EF2	EF3	EF4	EF5	Total
0	10	1	1	0	0	0	12
Injuries: 1

- February 25, 2007 – An EF0 tornado struck Elk Grove in Sacramento County and was on the ground for about one mile (1.6 km). It knocked over two power lines and damaged a house.
- April 14, 2007 – A small EF0 tornado touched down in Gilroy in Santa Clara County, which damaged an awning and a tree.
- September 1, 2007 – A plume of monsoonal moisture spawned two EF0 tornadoes. The first was reported by a pilot near Lancaster in Los Angeles County, lasting about five minutes. The other touched down near Rosamona in Kern County, which remained on the ground for 13.05 miles (21.00 km) over 20 minutes. The tornado damaged a few mobile homes, branches, and fences.
- September 22, 2007 – A large upper-level low moved ashore southern California, producing at least eight waterspouts off the coast of San Diego, of which two moved ashore as EF0 tornadoes. One came ashore Newport Beach in Orange County, and the other moved ashore Cardiff State Beach in San Diego County.
- January 24, 2008 – A waterspout struck the Point Mugu Naval Air Station in Ventura County, becoming an EF0 tornado, which damaged one roof.
- January 27, 2008 – An EF0 touched down in Visalia in Tulare County, crossing a trailer park and a golf course. The tornado damaged $750,000 worth of roofs, fences, and trees.
- May 22, 2008 – A line of thunderstorms in Riverside County produced four tornadoes, including California's first EF2 tornado since the Enhanced Fujita scale was implemented a year prior. The first of the four touched down near Alessandro and was on the ground for about six minutes. The second and strongest of the four hit March Air Reserve Base and later crossed Interstate 215, where it lifted a semi-truck more than 35 feet (11 m) into the air, severely injuring the truck driver. The tornado also damaged nine empty railcars with winds estimated at 120 mph (190 km/h), the greatest for a California tornado since 1998. Concurrent to the EF2 tornado was another brief tornado produced by the same overall system. The final tornado of the outbreak touched down over Gavilan Hills in an unpopulated area.
- August 4, 2008 – An EF1 landspout hit Johnson Valley in San Bernardino County, damaging a roof, two flag poles, and a tree.
- January 24, 2009 – A line of thunderstorms produced an EF0 tornado in rural Glenn County, which damaged a barn and a chicken coop. It was on the ground intermittently for 11 minutes before lifting up.
- February 9, 2009 – A pilot reported a tornado south of Merced Regional Airport in Merced County.

=== 2010–2019 ===
FU	EF0	EF1	EF2	EF3	EF4	EF5	Total
0	53	16	1	0	0	0	70
Injuries: 2

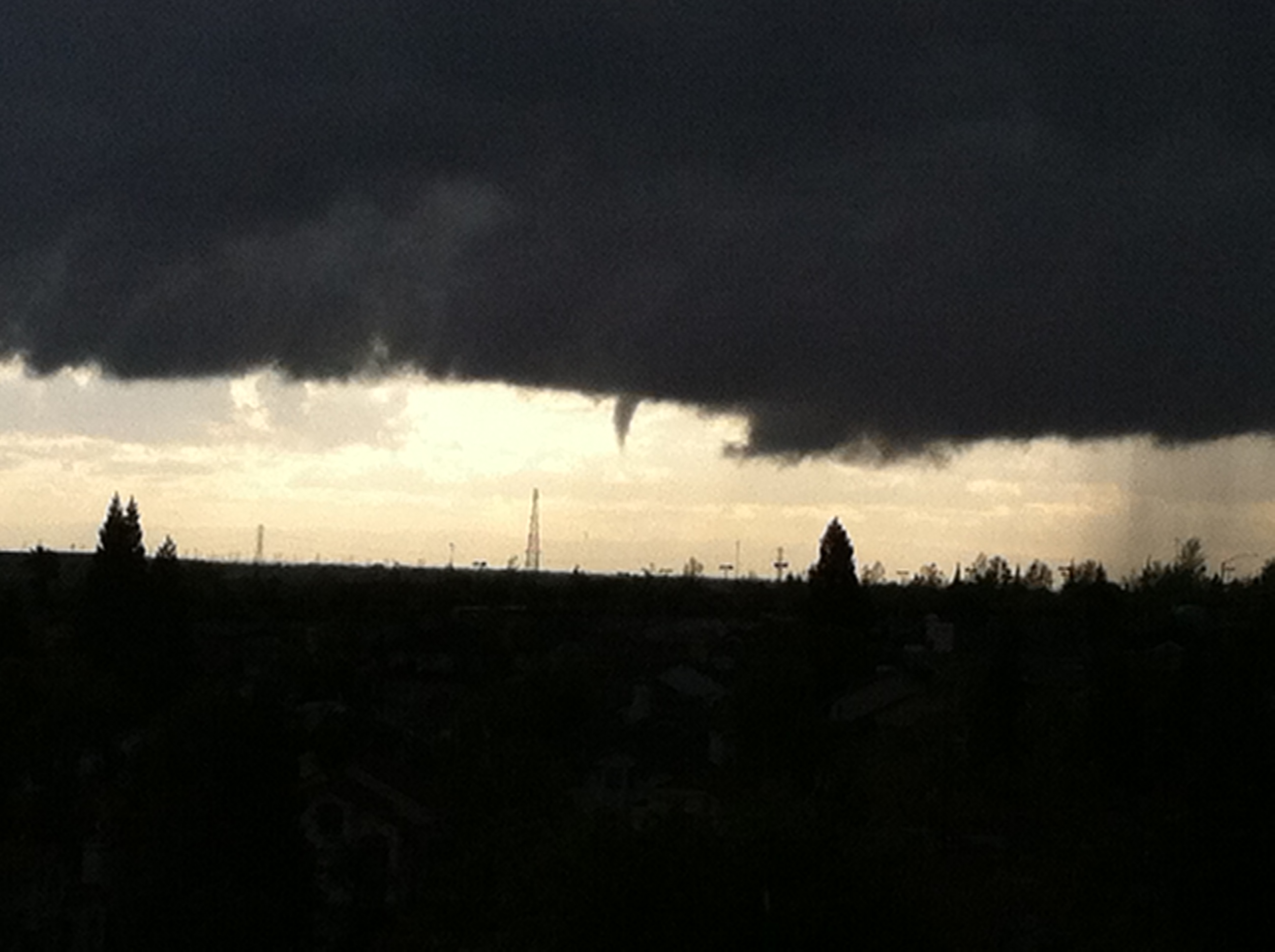
The EF0 tornado near Roseville on March 26, 2014

- January 18, 2010 – A series of winter storms spawned an EF0 tornado just west of Fresno, which was on the ground for only a few minutes.
- January 19, 2010 – There were two tornadoes, the first of which was a brief EF0 near Goleta in Santa Barbara County. The other began as a waterspout and moved ashore Sunset Beach in Orange County, crossing the Pacific Coast Highway and flipping a vehicle onto its side. The EF1 tornado damaged several roofs and windows.
- January 21, 2010 – A line of thunderstorms produced two tornadoes. The first was a brief EF0 in Ventura, which damaged a few homes and a car along its three-minute path. The other was an EF0 tornado that touched down near Blythe, blowing over two semi-trucks as it crossed I-10. The tornado caused about $3 million in damage along its 14.26-mile (22.95 km) path.
- February 27, 2010 – A brief EF0 tornado touched down in rural Kern County.
- March 8, 2010 – A brief EF0 tornado damaged a farm in Chrome in Glenn County.
- November 23, 2010 – An EF1 tornado hit Latrobe in El Dorado County, which damaged a few trees, a power pole, and the roof of a building.
- February 25, 2011 – An EF0 tornado touched down near Sacramento, damaging signs, windows, and a tree.
- March 18, 2011 – For several days, lines of thunderstorms moved across California, spawning an EF1 tornado which destroyed a building in Santa Rosa in Sonoma County.
- March 21, 2011 – There was a brief EF0 tornado in rural Colusa County.
- March 23, 2011 – An EF0 touched down in Williams in Colusa County, damaging seven buildings and two cars.
- April 7, 2011 – An EF0 struck Rockville in Solano County, damaging and a few trees and roofs.
- May 25, 2011 – There was an outbreak of three tornadoes across the Sacramento Valley. The first touched down near Artois in Glenn County, and remained on the ground for 21.65 miles (34.84 km), and for over an hour. It uprooted hundreds of almond trees, suggesting it was an EF1 tornado. The second tornado in the outbreak was also an EF1, touching down near Durham in Butte County, and remaining on the ground for 26.37 miles (42.44 km). It uprooted thousands of almond trees and damaged four buildings. The third tornado was an EF2 that was on the ground for three minutes near Oroville, which destroyed a garage and severely damaged a barn.
- June 1, 2011 – An EF0 moved through peach and walnut groves near Yuba City in Sutter County.
- March 17, 2012 – An EF0 was briefly on the ground near Tranquility in Fresno County.
- April 11, 2012 – An EF0 tornado touched down briefly near French Camp in San Joaquin County, destroying one building.
- August 12, 2012 – A landspout developed within a severe thunderstorm near Perris in Riverside County, remaining over open fields before dissipating.
- September 9, 2012 – Another landspout touched down over open fields near Perris in Riverside County, remaining nearly stationary for an hour.
- October 22, 2012 – There was an outbreak of five tornadoes, related to a large low pressure area moving ashore in northern California. The first was an EF1 that struck a golf course near Yuba City in Sutter County, uprooting several trees. The tornado also damaged roofs, cars, and nearby orchards. There were two other tornadoes that day in Yuba County – an EF1 that damaged a few roofs, and an EF0 in an open field. An EF1 tornado hit Elk Grove in Sacramento County that damaged around a dozen houses. An EF1 also struck Lake of the Pines in Nevada County, damaging houses, trees, and power lines. The five tornadoes marked the most in the state on a single day since 1996.
- November 9, 2012 – A weak tornado touched down near Tipton in rural Tulare County.
- November 30, 2012 – A landspout touched down in rural Inyo County.
- December 22, 2012 – A waterspout in Monterey Bay moved ashore Watsonville in Santa Cruz County, damaging five buildings. It was rated an EF0.
- February 19, 2013 – A winter storm spawned two weak landspouts in the Central Valley that were rated EF0. The first was near Gerber in Tehama County, which damaged a barn. The other lasted about for about a minute in Colusa County.
- April 4, 2013 – An EF0 hit an empty field near Red Bluff in Tehama County, lasting for about two minutes.
- August 18, 2013 – A brief landspout touched down near Helendale in San Bernardino County.
- February 28, 2014 – An EF0 tornado touched down on two occasions in Woodland in Yolo County along its five-minute path.
- March 25, 2014 – A brief EF0 tornado knocked over a tree in Butte County.
- March 26, 2014 – A trough spawned a series of four tornadoes. The first two were brief EF1 tornadoes that touched down in rural areas near Bayliss in Glenn County, damaging farming equipment. The third was an EF1 near Pleasant Grove in Placer County, which damaged vehicles and stripped fruit from their orchards. The fourth was an EF0 in western Roseville, also in Placer County, that remained on the ground for 4.02 miles (6.47 km), damaging several windows.
- March 29, 2014 – A brief EF0 tornado uprooted a tree in Butte County.
- December 12, 2014 – An EF0 tornado touched down in South Los Angeles, damaging a few roofs as well as a billboard.
- February 23, 2015 – A brief EF0 tornado was reported in the Temblor Range of Kern County.
- April 21, 2015 – A small EF0 tornado touched down in eastern Riverside County, remaining on the ground for 10 miles (16 km) over 15 minutes. Windblown debris damaged a few car windows and solar panels.

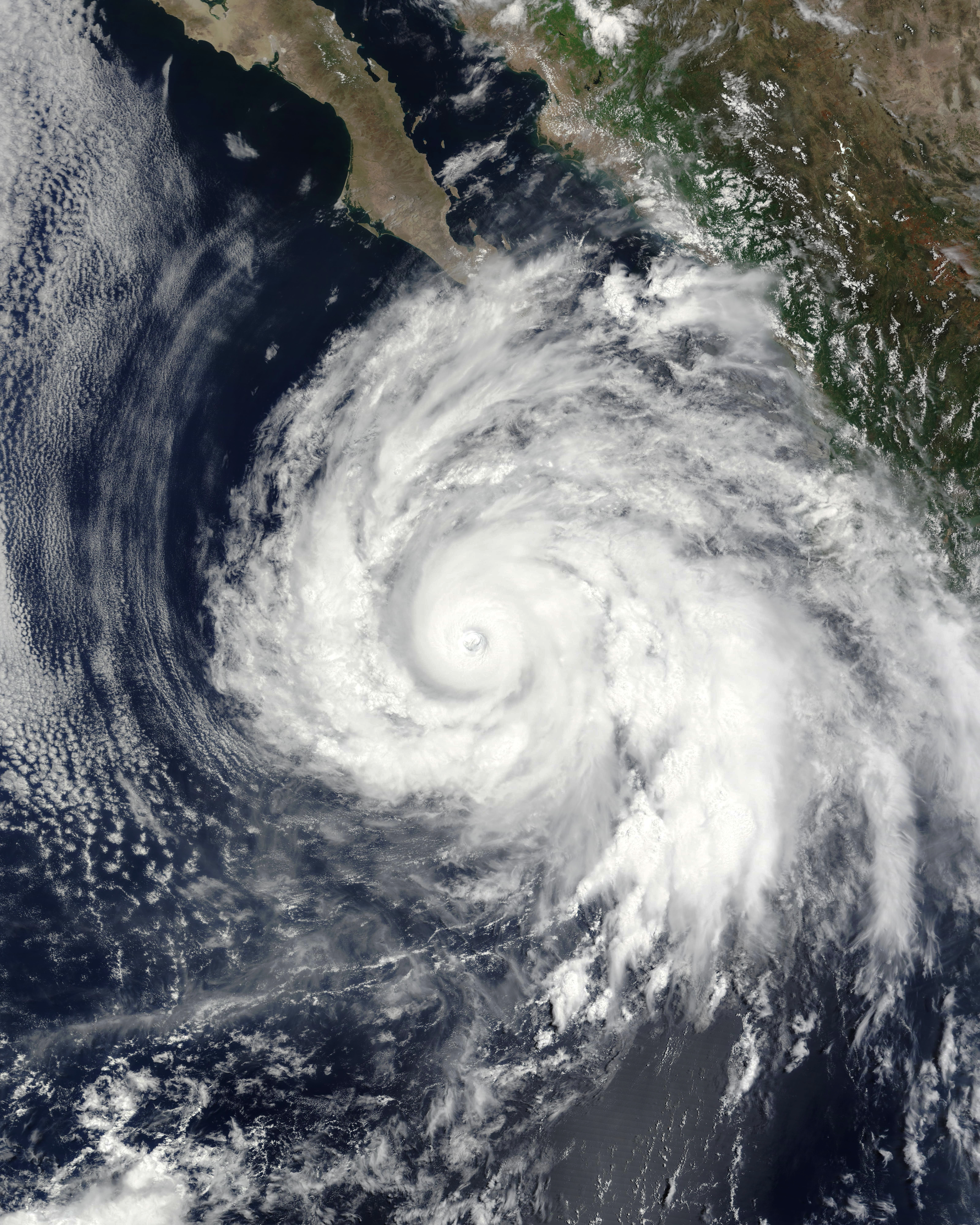
Satellite image of Hurricane Dolores, which spawned tornadoes in the southern California desert

- July 19, 2015 – Moisture from Hurricane Dolores spawned two brief landspouts in the desert in San Bernardino County.
- July 20, 2015 – A brief tornado touched down in Lassen County near the border with Nevada, likely originating from a landspout.
- August 6, 2015 – An EF1 tornado developed within a stationary thunderstorm near Mecca in Riverside County, and took a slow 3.98-mile (6.41 km) path over 30 minutes. The tornado damaged 140 power poles, incurring $18 million in damage and injuring two people. This is California's costliest tornado.
- October 17, 2015 – A brief landspout touched down in rural Riverside County.
- November 15, 2015 – An intermittent EF1 tornado hit Denair in Stanislaus County, damaging 21 homes along its 3 mi (4.8 km) path. Damage was estimated at $1.2 million.
- December 24, 2015 – A cold front spawned two tornadoes in the state. The first was an EF1 that touched down over Folsom Lake in El Dorado County, and lasted intermittently for about 30 minutes, causing about $1 million in damage along its 6.2-mile (10.0 km) path. The other event was a brief EF0 tornado in Stanislaus County.
- January 6, 2016 – A tornado touched down in San Benito County, causing $75,000 worth of damage to a barn.
- April 22, 2016 – A brief landspout hit two trees and damaged a barn in Monterey County.
- April 27, 2016 – A cold front spawned a waterspout over Lake Berryessa, as well as a short-lived tornado near Waterford in Stanislaus County which uprooted a tree.
- January 9, 2017 – A brief EF0 tornado was reported in a field near Lincoln in Placer County.
- January 11, 2017 – An EF0 tornado struck the Natomas neighborhood of Sacramento and stayed on the ground for about three minutes, with a path length of 0.42 miles (0.68 km). The tornado caused $25,000 worth of damage to a few awnings, fences, and trees.
- May 7, 2017 – A weak landspout touched down near Victorville in San Bernardino County and lasted for about 15 minutes.
- January 25, 2018 – A waterspout developed over Humboldt Bay and moved ashore Woodley Island, becoming an EF0 tornado. It produced winds of 54 mph (87 km/h).
- February 12, 2018 – An EF0 tornado hit farms near Sanger in Fresno County.
- March 3, 2018 – An EF0 landspout was on the ground for about eight minutes in Inyo County.
- March 21, 2018 – A short-lived EF0 tornado hit Arboga in Yuba County, which damaged an amphitheater.
- March 22, 2018 – A short-lived EF0 tornado touched down in Dinuba in Tulare County.
- August 16, 2018 – A landspout touched down in Anza within a larger severe thunderstorm.
- January 6, 2019 – A cold front spawned two waterspouts which made landfall in Santa Cruz, both becoming EF0 tornadoes. One of the tornadoes hit the Santa Cruz Wharf, which damaged the roof and outdoor tables of a restaurant.
- January 17, 2019 – A landfalling winter storm spawned an EF1 tornado near Clovis in Fresno County, which damaged a building.
- February 2, 2019 – A strong winter storm produced three EF0 tornadoes across the state. The first touched down in a wetlands area along the Sacramento River near Colusa, lasting for about five minutes. The second was briefly on the ground in Mariposa County. The third touched down near Yuba City in Sutter County, which damaged a few trees as well as one home.
- February 15, 2019 – A cold front produced several funnel clouds across the San Joaquin Valley, including an EF0 tornado that touched down near Yosemite Lakes in Madera County.
- March 2, 2019 – A cold front spawned a brief EF0 tornado in Mendota in Fresno County, which damaged three roofs.
- September 28, 2019 – An EF0 tornado briefly touched down in a field near Davis in Yolo County.

=== 2020–present ===
EFU	EF0	EF1	EF2	EF3	EF4	EF5	Total
2	28	5	0	0	0	0	32
Injuries: 7

- May 18, 2020 – An EF0 tornado lasted five minutes southwest of Michigan Bar in Sacramento County.
- November 18, 2020 – There were two tornadoes in the state. A weak EF0 tornado touched down in Butte County. Later in the day, another weak EF0 tornado struck near Frenchtown in El Dorado County, which was on the ground for 4.39 miles (7.07 km), and with a width of two yards (1.8 m).
- January 4, 2021 – There were two tornadoes in Tehama County. An EF0 tornado damaged multiple buildings and knocked down several trees southwest of Henleyville. Later in the day, a tornado occurred in an open field northeast of Vina.
- April 25, 2021 – An EF0 tornado struck the town of Capay in Tehama County and caused $30,000 in damage to two homes. About 40 orchard trees were also damaged or uprooted.
- September 9, 2021 – A narrow EF0 tornado occurred south-southeast of Lake Los Angeles.
- April 21, 2022 – A brief EFU tornado occurred east-northeast of Terminous in San Joaquin County.
- August 28, 2022 – A nearly stationary EFU tornado occurred north of Desert Center in Riverside County for five minutes.
- October 8, 2022 – An EF0 landspout caused minor damage from the city of Menifee to Southern Canyon Lake in Riverside County.
- November 8, 2022 – A brief EF0 tornado touched down north of Galt in Sacramento County, with a width of 400 yards (370 m).
- January 10, 2023 – A brief EF1 tornado caused extensive tree damage to white oak and pine trees north-northwest of Felix in Calaveras County. Several trees were uprooted and topped, suggesting winds of 90 mph (140 km/h). The tornado marked the first occasion for the Sacramento NWS to issue an overnight tornado warning.
- January 14, 2023 – A brief EF0 tornado struck near the community of Clay in Sacramento County, where it caused $25,000 in damage to three residences.
- February 23, 2023 – A brief and narrow non-supercell EF0 tornado occurred north-northwest of Cerritos in Los Angeles County.
- February 27, 2023 – A waterspout moved ashore 11 miles (18 km) west of Piercy in Mendocino County, becoming an EFU tornado, as it dissipated shortly after landfall as it encountered steep terrain.
- March 11, 2023 – An EF0 tornado touched down near New Melones Lake in Tuolumne County, snapping several trees as well as a power pole.
- March 21, 2023 – An EF0 tornado struck a trailer park in Carpinteria in Santa Barbara County, damaging 26 homes and causing one injury.
- March 22, 2023 – A high end EF1 tornado hit Montebello in Los Angeles County injuring one person. The tornado also damaged 17 buildings as well as several vehicles. This was the worst tornado to hit the area since 1983.
- May 4, 2023 – Two EF0 tornadoes touched down in Compton in Los Angeles County within the span of eleven minutes, causing damage to trees, roofs, and a power line.
- December 19, 2023 – An EF1 tornado spawned by a thunderstorm in Oroville in Butte County briefly touched the ground, tearing shingles off roofs, uprooting trees, snapping limbs off trees, toppling a light pole and damaging carports.
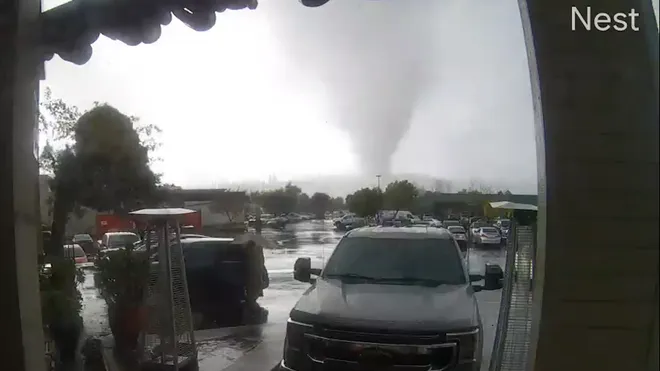
- An EF1 tornado that injured five people in the Scotts Valley area on December 14, 2024
  February 7, 2024 – There were two EF1 tornadoes in San Luis Obispo County, the first in the county since 2004. The first originated from a supercell that formed over the ocean and moved ashore, spawning a tornado in Los Osos, and going to the outskirts of Morro Bay. The tornado downed power lines and damaged a greenhouse. The other tornado touched down in Grover Beach, which knocked down trees onto cars and power lines, and damaged a few buildings.
- March 1, 2024 – An EF0 tornado struck a school in the city of Madera, knocking down several trees and damaging a fence, as well as some classrooms.
- December 14, 2024 – An EF1 tornado struck Scotts Valley, Santa Cruz County, overturning seven cars and injuring at least 5 people.
- January 3, 2025 – A winter storm spawned an EFU tornado in an unpopulated area near Paynes Creek in Tehama County.
- February 13, 2025 – An EF0 tornado struck Oxnard in Ventura County, damaging 12 mobile homes, four of them severely.
- March 13, 2025 – An EF0 tornado touched down in Pico Rivera in Los Angeles County, which damaged a few cars and homes.
- April 1, 2025 – An EF0 tornado touched down near Salida in Stanislaus County. The tornado moved through several orchards and properties, uprooting dozens of almond trees and snapping large tree branches. Minor structure damage was observed on the properties, and a large trailer was lifted and moved approximately 20 ft (6.1 m).
- December 25, 2025 – An EF0 tornado hit the Los Angeles neighborhood of Boyle Heights, damaging several homes and a strip mall.
- April 12, 2026 -- An EFU tornado briefly touched down southeast of Vina in Tehama County.
- April 21, 2026 – Four tornadoes touched down in the Central Valley. The first was briefly on the ground near Biola, rated an EF0. The next was an EF1 tornado that damaged a home near Atwater in Merced County. Another EF1 tornado destroyed a barn when it touched down northeast of Clovis. The final tornado damaged a store in Terra Bella in Tulare County, rated EF0.

=== Fire whirl events ===
EFU	EF0	EF1	EF2	EF3	EF4	EF5	Total
1	0	3	1	1	0	0	6
Deaths: 4				Injuries: 6			

The 2018 Carr Fire tornado that developed within the Carr Fire in Redding

- March 7, 1964 – A fire whirl formed within a brush fire near the city of Santa Barbara. The fire whirl severely damaged two homes, as well as cars, a barn, and a chicken coop.
- July 26, 2018 – A fire whirl developed in Redding in Shasta County within the Carr Fire and produced winds over 143 mph (230 km/h), which is equivalent to those of an EF3 tornado. The fire whirl remained on the ground for about a half hour, with a path of about two miles (3.2 km), which damaged trees, power lines, and houses. One house collapsed, killing the three occupants, and a firefighter died while driving near the fire whirl. The tornado also caused six injuries when three vehicles were struck by flying debris and embers.
- August 15, 2020 – The Loyalton Fire spawned three anticyclonic tornadoes from a pyrocumulonimbus cloud, all in Lassen County. The first tornado was rated EF1 after snapping and uprooting several Jeffrey pine trees in Roberts Canyon. The National Weather Service in Reno, Nevada issued a tornado warning for the storm, the first time such a warning had ever been issued for a fire whirl. An EF1 fire whirl snapped several quaking aspen trees. An EFU fire whirl traversed across an area of burned sagebrush and was unable to have an accurate damage assessment.
- September 5, 2020 – The Creek Fire spawned two fire whirls. The first was an EF2 that struck the Sierra National Forest in eastern Madera County, with estimated winds up to 125 mph (201 km/h). The fire whirl touched down north of Mammoth Pool Reservoir and near Chawanakee Joint Elementary School, and was on the ground for about 12 miles (19 km), downing several two-foot (0.61 m) diameter trees, 20–30 feet (6.1–9.1 m) above the ground. Later in the day, an EF1 fire whirl snapped or uprooted several large trees near Huntington Lake in Fresno County.
- July 25, 2024 – Amid the Park Fire, there was a possible fire whirl northeast of Chico recorded by video feed.

== Climatological statistics ==
The following is a chart showing California tornadoes by month or by time period.

Recorded tornadoes affecting California by month
Month	Number of tornadoes
January	58
February	68
March	87
April	66
May	41
June	12
July	20
August	22
September	25
October	21
November	38
December	47

Recorded tornadoes affecting California by time period
Period	Number of tornadoes
1800s	55
1900–49	18
1950s	28
1960s	26
1970s	43
1980s	60
1990s	117
2000s	65
2010s	70
2020s	32

=== Tornadoes by county ===
The following chart lists the number of tornadoes by county, based on the location of where the tornado first touched down, and listed by intensity on the Fujita scale, or the Enhanced Fujita scale after 2007. There have never been any recorded tornadoes in Alpine, Amador, Lake, Modoc, Mono, Napa, Plumas, Sierra, or Trinity counties.

Fire whirls are indicated with a †.

Number of tornadoes organized by Fujita or Enhanced Fujita scale rating
County	EF/FU	EF/F0	EF/F1	EF/F2	EF/F3	Total
Alameda	0	2	2	0	0	4
Butte	3	9	6	2	0	20
Calaveras	1	0	1	0	0	2
Colusa	0	4	0	0	0	4
Contra Costa	0	3	0	0	0	3
Del Norte	1	3	2	0	0	6
El Dorado	0	2	2	0	0	4
Fresno	1	21	10†	1	0	33
Glenn	0	4	5	1	0	10
Humboldt	0	1	0	1	0	2
Imperial	1	4	2	0	0	7
Inyo	1	2	0	0	0	3
Kern	0	11	2	0	0	13
Kings	0	5	1	1	0	7
Lassen	1†	1	2†	0	0	4
Los Angeles	10	30	15	10	0	65
Madera	2	6	2	1†	0	11
Marin	0	0	1	1	0	2
Mariposa	0	3	0	0	0	3
Mendocino	2	1	1	0	0	4
Merced	1	12	6	0	0	19
Monterey	0	3	2	0	0	5
Nevada	0	0	1	0	0	1
Orange	5	13	10	1	1	30
Placer	0	5	2	0	0	7
Riverside	3	18	4	1	1	27
Sacramento	0	8	3	3	0	14
San Benito	0	1	0	1	0	2
San Bernardino	8	17	5	3	0	32
San Diego	11	17	8	1	0	37
San Francisco	1	0	0	0	0	1
San Joaquin	3	12	3	2	0	18
San Luis Obispo	0	2	2	0	0	4
San Mateo	1	1	1	0	0	3
Santa Barbara	3†	6	0	0	0	9
Santa Clara	0	3	1	3	0	7
Santa Cruz	0	5	3	0	0	8
Shasta	0	0	0	0	1†	1
Siskiyou	0	0	1	0	0	1
Solano	0	4	0	0	0	4
Sonoma	2	1	7	0	0	10
Stanislaus	1	4	3	1	0	9
Sutter	0	4	1	0	0	5
Tehama	5	6	0	2	0	13
Tulare	1	13	1	0	0	15
Tuolumne	0	1	0	0	0	1
Ventura	0	7	0	0	0	7
Yolo	0	6	0	0	0	6
Yuba	0	1	2	0	0	3
Total	67	280	118	28	3	496

== See also ==
- Lists of tornadoes and tornado outbreaks
- Climate of California

- List of California floods
- List of California hurricanes
- List of California wildfires
