= 1983 South Central Los Angeles tornado =

Tornado in southern California

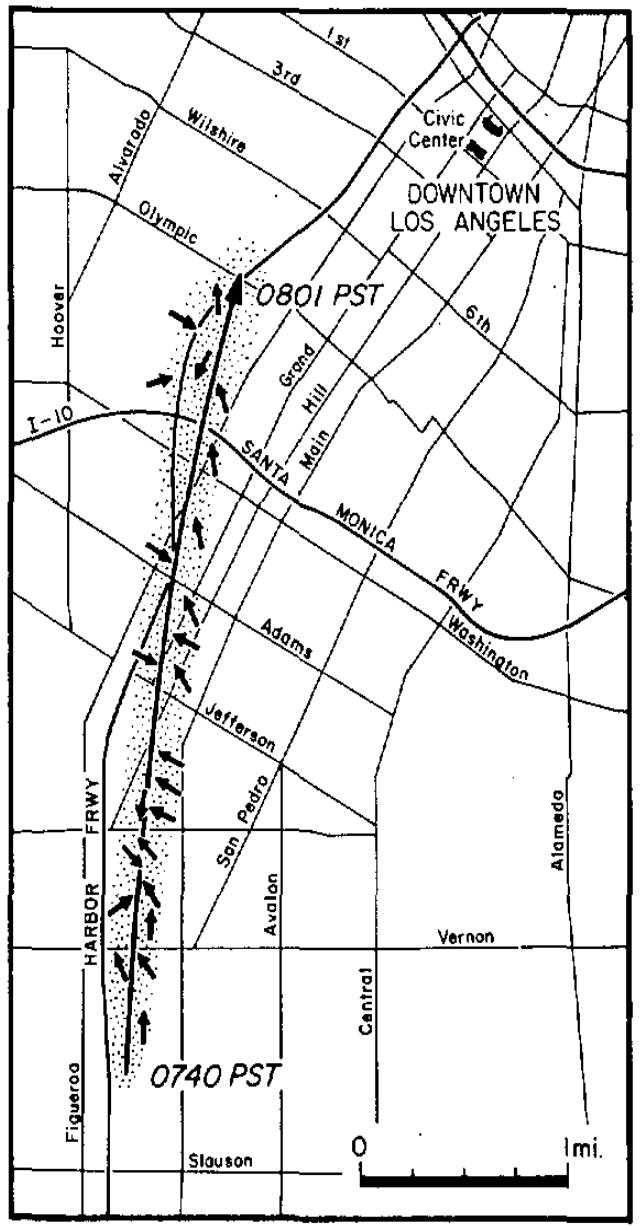
- Path of the tornado

Meteorological history
- Formed: March 1, 1983, ~7:40 a.m. PST (UTC−08:00)
- Dissipated: March 1, 1983, ~8:05 a.m. PST (UTC−08:00)
- Duration: 20–25 minutes

F2 tornado
- on the Fujita scale
- Highest winds: 240 km/h (150 mph)

Overall effects
- Injuries: 30
- Damage: $50,000–$50 million (Note: Storm Data, a monthly compilation of significant weather events in the U.S., classifies storm damage in logarithmic monetary intervals. The 1983 tornado is listed as falling within damage categories 5–7; category 5 corresponds to $50,000–$500,000 in damage and category 7 corresponds to $5 million–$50 million in damage.) (Note: All monetary figures in 1983 United States dollars unless otherwise noted.)
- Economic losses: $15 million
- Areas affected: South Central Los Angeles
- Part of the Tornadoes of 1983

The 1983 South Central Los Angeles tornado was a significant F2 tornado that occurred on the morning of March 1, 1983, in South Central Los Angeles. The tornado touched down at around 7:40 a.m. PST (UTC−08:00) near 51st Street, taking a north-northeastward path paralleling the Harbor Freeway before lifting near Olympic Boulevard at around 8:05 a.m. PST. The damage swath was roughly 3.5 mi (5.6 km) long and up to 660 yd (600 m) wide. Over a hundred homes were damaged, of which around 50 were destroyed. Virtually all power lines in the tornado's path were ruptured and numerous power poles were blown over or snapped by the tornado. The tornado also inflicted significant damage to the Los Angeles Convention Center, which required $3 million in repairs. Losses sustained by public, residential, and commercial infrastructure amounted to $15 million. As the broader meteorological conditions did not resemble those typically associated with tornadoes, no tornado watch or warning was issued in advance of the tornado and tornadic activity was not anticipated. At least 30 people were injured, primarily by flying glass, and over a hundred people were displaced due to the damage.

== Meteorological synopsis ==
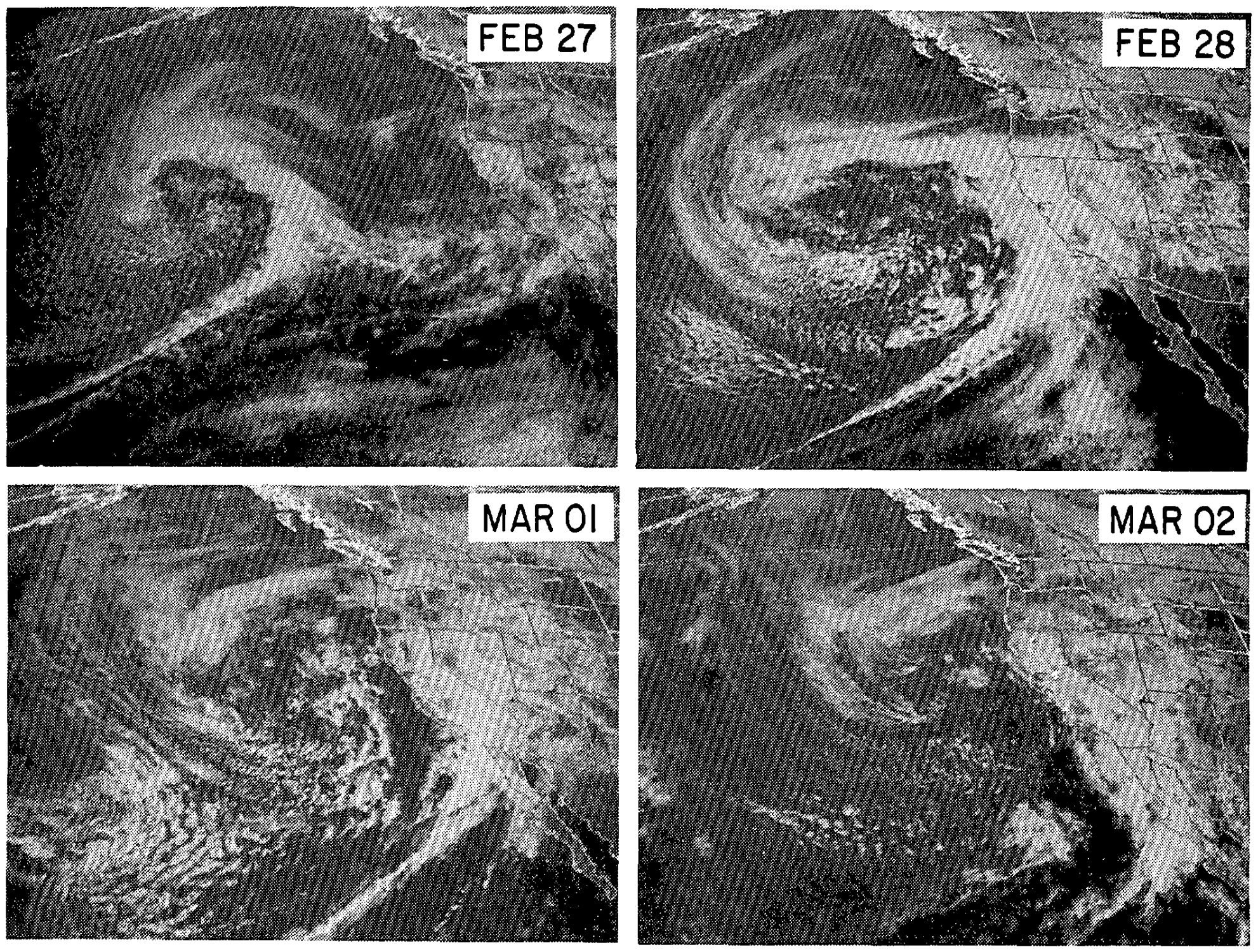
Satellite images of the storm system associated with the tornado

The prevailing weather conditions associated with the 1983 tornado did not resemble the conditions commonly considered conducive to strong tornado development. Characteristics such as a strong contrast between air masses, an intense weather front, and tall cumulonimbus clouds with heights reaching 12 mi (20 km) – typical for tornado events in the Midwestern United States – were all absent during the Los Angeles tornado. On the morning of March 1, 1983, a low-pressure area was centered 220 mi (350 km) off the coast of Northern California. A cold front extended southward from the low-pressure system inland of the California coastline, bisecting the Southern California coast between Oxnard and Los Angeles. The front produced only a weak contrast in air pressure, temperature, and wind, and the broader cyclone was not unusual for the region. At 6:00 a.m. PST, a weather balloon launched from the University of Southern California (USC) in Los Angeles detected a moist and conditionally unstable layer of air aloft between 1000–760 mbar (hPa; 29.5–22.4 inHg); (Note: Air pressure decreases monotonically with height and can be used as a vertical coordinate. In the 1976 U.S. Standard Atmosphere, the 1000 mbar level roughly corresponds to 360 ft (110 m) above mean sea level (ASL); the 760 mbar level roughly corresponds to 7,740 ft (2,360 m) ASL.) these conditions were favorable for the development of heavy rain showers. Accordingly, the National Weather Service (NWS) forecast heavy rain showers for the area on March 1 but issued no tornado watch.

The Los Angeles tornado occurred between around 7:40 a.m. to 8:05 a.m. PST on March 1, lasting for 20–25 minutes. The tornado moved at an average speed of 10 mph (16 km/h) on a south-southwest to north-northeast trajectory extending from 51st Street to Olympic Boulevard just east of the Harbor Freeway. Coincidentally, Bernard Ferrier, an instructor at USC, was concurrently teaching a class on meteorological observations on the roof of the eight-story Vivian Hall about 0.62 mi (1 km) away from the tornado. Before he and his students sought shelter, Ferrier's hand-held anemometer registered wind gusts of at least 75 mph (121 km/h): the highest mark on the anemometer's scale. Ferrier attempted to look for the funnel cloud associated with the tornado but did not spot any. Los Angeles emergency management received its first report of the tornado at 7:59 a.m. PST; paramedics responding to a separate incident reported a funnel cloud near the intersection of 47th Street and Broadway. The tornado path ended about 1.5 mi (2.4 km) southwest of the Los Angeles Civic Center. Data from a weather radar operated by the NWS in western Los Angeles indicated that cloud tops in the Los Angeles Basin rose no higher than 18,000 ft (5,500 m) in altitude and that the highest cloud tops were not in the vicinity of the tornado while it was causing damage. None of the radar signatures associated with tornadoes were apparent. In an assessment of the meteorological conditions prepared by the Committee on Natural Disasters of the National Research Council, the committee concluded that "a tornado forecast or warning would have been difficult to justify" given the contemporary understanding of tornadoes. The NWS subsequently issued a tornado watch for the Los Angeles area after the tornado occurred; the watch was lifted during the late afternoon on March 1.

== Impact and aftermath ==
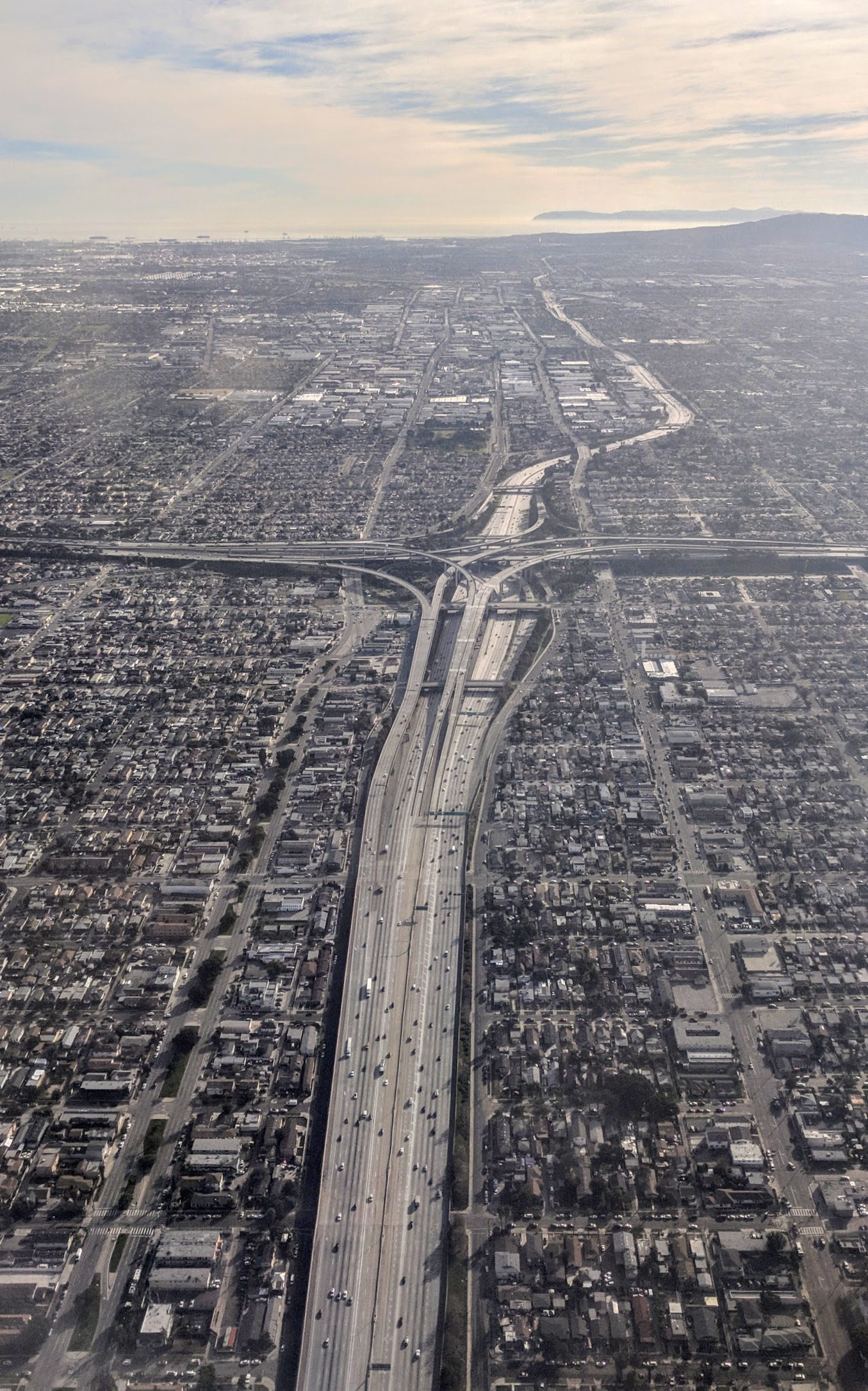
The tornado roughly paralleled the Harbor Freeway in south Los Angeles.

The tornado destroyed around 50 homes and 7 businesses along a path 3.5 mi (5.6 km) long, with most of the damage occurring in South Central Los Angeles. Another 58 homes and 82 businesses were damaged according to municipal personnel. Either 30 or 32 people suffered injuries, primarily by flying glass; none of the injuries were serious. Over a hundred others were rendered homeless as a result of the damage. The significant damage path was approximately 550–660 yd (500–600 m) wide, with minimal or negligible damage outside of that swath; the overall affected area spanned approximately 3 mi^{2} (7.8 km^{2}). The tornado came within 0.25 mi (0.40 km) of Los Angeles's high-rise buildings. An estimated $11 million in losses were sustained by homes and businesses while $4 million in losses were sustained by the public sector. The Committee on Natural Disasters of the National Research Council assessed the meteorological conditions and damage, concluding that the severity and character of the damage was consistent with a tornado rated F2 on the Fujita scale. Weather researcher Thomas P. Grazulis described the tornado as a "minimal F2". Roofs, roofing, and older wood buildings were especially impacted by the tornado. Masonry buildings constructed prior to 1934 were also more heavily damaged than newer or reinforced earthquake-resistant structures. According to the Committee on Natural Disasters, the tornado was a "complete surprise" due to the lack of tornado warnings and the erroneous conventional wisdom shared by residents and the NWS that tornadoes did not occur in the region; however, the activation of the Los Angeles Emergency Operations Center in response to the overall storm system on February 28 accelerated response times to the tornado's impacts by about 1.5 hours.

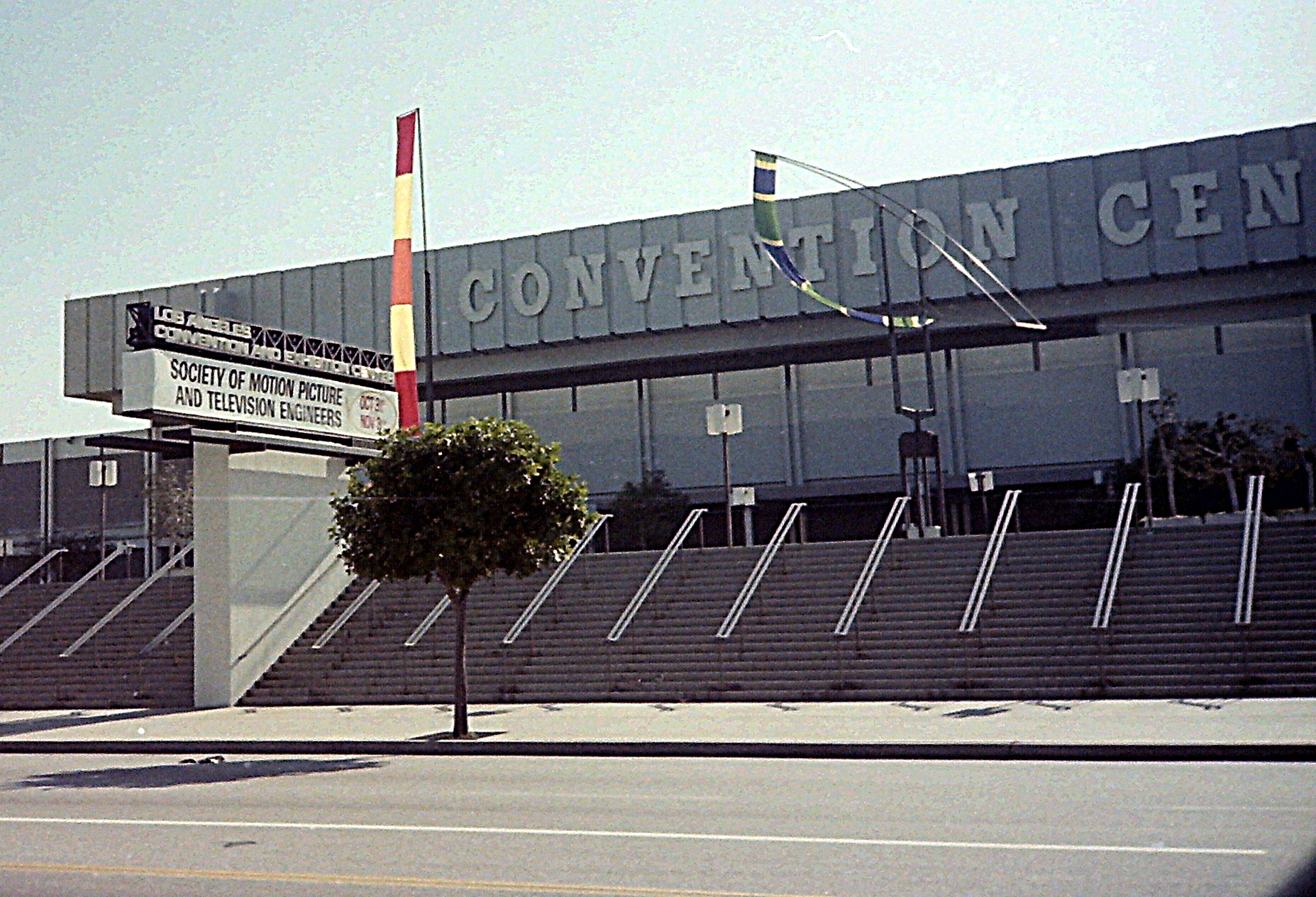
The Los Angeles Convention Center in October 1983

Many buildings sustained parapet, roof, and window damage. The most severe damage occurred near Broadway between 40th and 50th Streets. The Los Angeles Convention Center sustained significant damage to its roof and upper-level paneling, with over a third of the roof destroyed;the damage was repaired at a cost of $3 million by the City of Los Angeles. The twisting of a large billboard downed by the tornado indicated wind speeds potentially in excess of 150 mph (240 km/h). Several cars were lofted and overturned by the tornado; one driver was injured on the Santa Monica Freeway as the tornado swept across the interstate. Nearly every overhead power line in the tornado swath was severed by strong winds, including both subtransmission lines and distribution lines. Numerous wooden power poles were also damaged or blown askew; 25 poles were snapped either at ground-level or at height. Telephone lines were also downed by the storm, resulting in disruption to about 300 telephone connections; service was restored to 90 percent of affected customers within five days of the tornado. Total damage to the telephone system amounted to roughly $400,000. Downed power and telephone poles along with debris from buildings led to the closure of some roads and prompted the Los Angeles Police Department (LAPD) to restrict travel on some parts of the Harbor Freeway. The damage wrought by the tornado also caused 165 natural gas outages affecting residential and commercial areas. Gas and electric service was restored by March 5.

The declared disaster area associated with the tornado was bounded by Harbor Freeway to the west, Central Avenue to the east, 7th Street to the north, and Slauson Avenue to the south. The LAPD dispatched 100 officers to the affected area while the Los Angeles Fire Department dispatched 29 firefighting companies, three ambulances, and two helicopters. At around 7 p.m. PST on March 1, an LAPD helicopter dispatched to assist emergency efforts crashed after colliding with a power line on takeoff, killing one person and seriously injuring two others. The American Red Cross also assisted in the relief effort, establishing a primary shelter for tornado victims at Manual Arts High School that operated from March 1–6; the shelter provided aid to 188 victims and the Red Cross spent $17,024 on relief supplies. The Los Angeles Community Redevelopment Agency provided $1 million in financial assistance to repair homes while the city's Community Development Department provided free labor to repair homes.

Aside from the F2-rated tornado, widespread beach erosion and some flooding resulted from the strong winds and heavy rainfall produced between February 28–March 3 by the low-pressure system over the eastern Pacific. Rainfall totals over the entire period reached as high as 18.4 in (470 mm) over higher elevations. Floods impacted several counties, including Los Angeles County. City officials ordered the voluntary evacuation of 800 homes near the Lopez Canyon city landfall as floodwaters from the saturated landfill threatened to inundate a housing tract. Flooding in Ventura County inflicted around $1 million in damage to businesses and homes on February 28, prompting evacuations. Strong winds in Santa Ana, California, overturned a mobile home and damaged 20 other homes at a mobile home park on March 1. The storm system also produced an F0-rated tornado in San Marino, California, at around 8:15 PST on March 1. That tornado caused minor damage, but injured the driver of a car that was lifted 15 ft (4.6 m) into the air and carried across a highway. A waterspout also occurred off Will Rogers State Beach on March 3.

== See also ==
- List of North American tornadoes and tornado outbreaks
- 1939 California tropical storm
- Los Angeles Convention Center
- List of California tornadoes
