= Henleyville, California =

Unincorporated community in California, United States

- Unincorporated community
- Location within California
- Coordinates: 39°57′43″N 122°19′36″W
- Country: United States
- State: California
- County: Tehama
- Elevation: 436 ft (133 m)

Henleyville is an unincorporated community in Tehama County, in the U.S. state of California.

== History ==
Henleyville was one of the communities in Tehama County homesteaded by settlers in the 1860s and 1870s. It was likely named after William N. Henley, who was from Indiana and registered to vote at "Henleys" on August 3, 1866.

A post office occupied the same building as the general store, and was in operation at Henleyville from 1873 to 1878, and from 1880 until 1936.

In October 1881, the Howell School in Henleyville had one teacher and 15 students, including five boys and ten girls.

According to the Red Bluff Daily News, the first death by lightning recorded in Tehama County occurred on October 4, 1901, four miles west of Henleyville, killing an 18 year old at a blacksmith shop, as well as the horse he was shoeing.

When writer Pearl S. Buck won the Nobel Prize in Literature in 1938, the Red Bluff Daily News reported that she was a niece of area resident Thomas L. Sydenstricker and once visited his Henleyville home.

== Population ==
Based on 1990 census data, a United States Department of Agriculture report found that the population of the Henleyville-Paskenta-Sunnyside "block group aggregation" was 1,697.

== Gallery ==
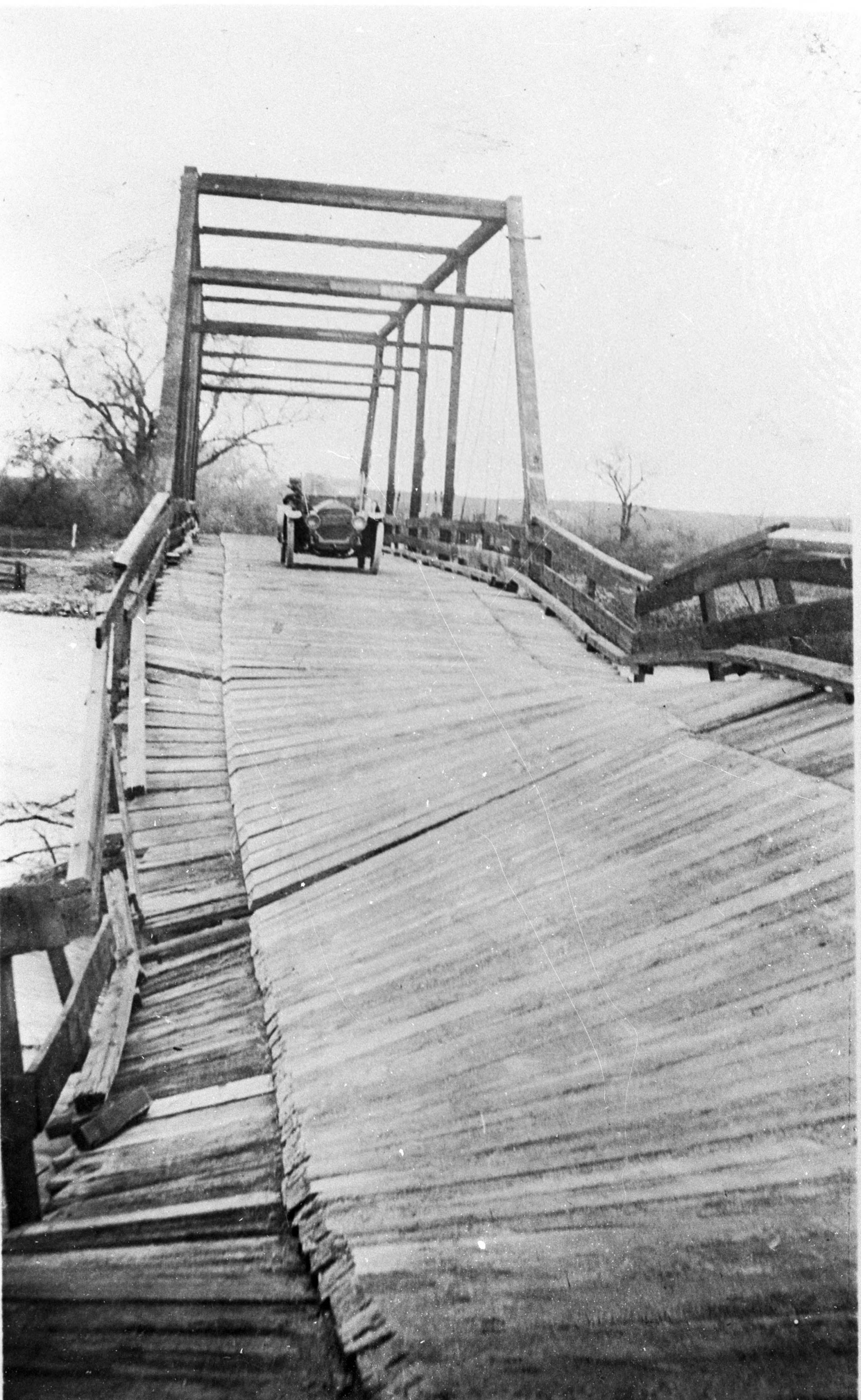
Henleyville Bridge, c.1920

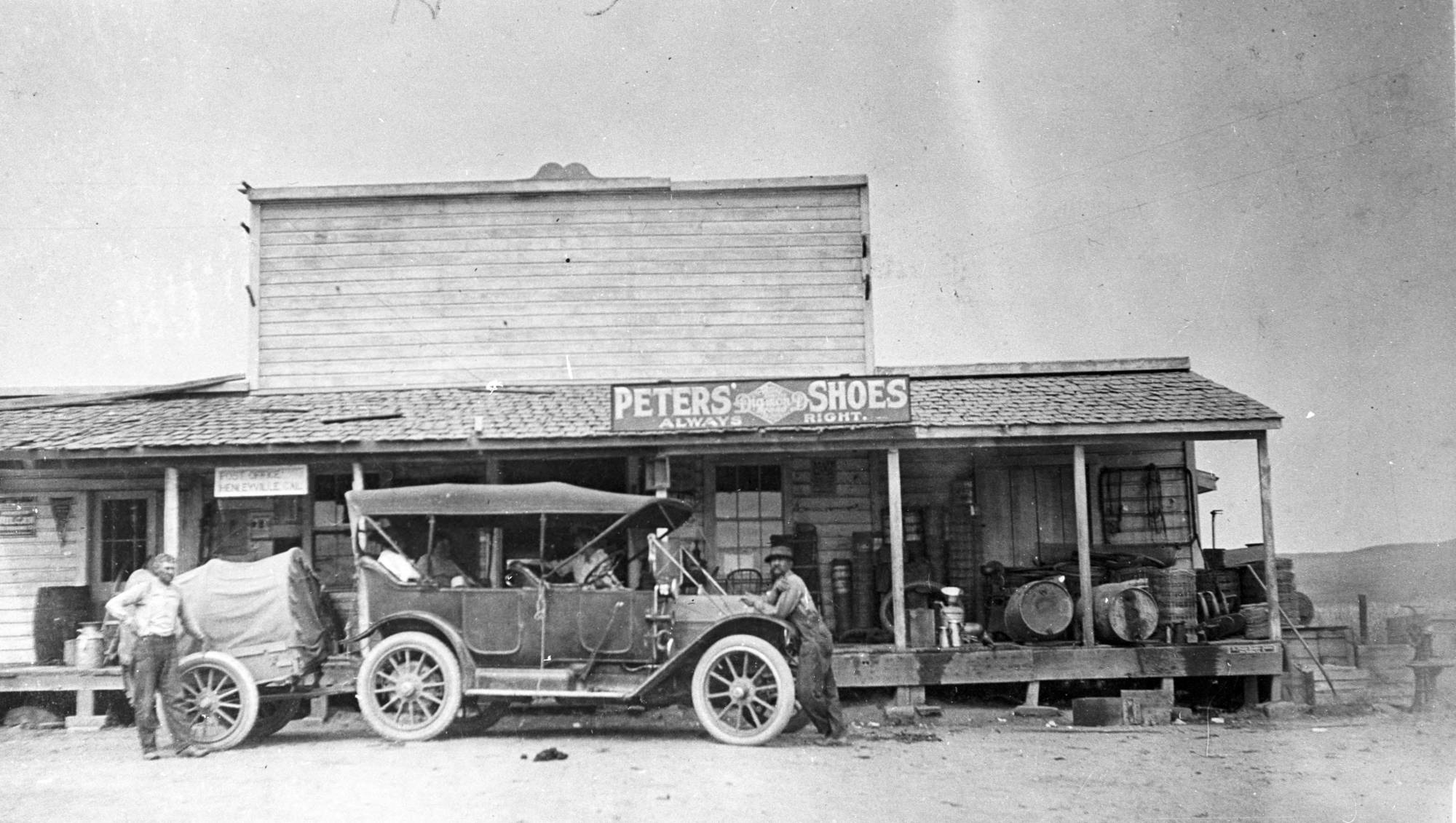
Henleyville Post Office and Peter's Shoes, c.1920
