= Mooretown Rancheria of Maidu Indians =

Ethnic group in California, United States

Coordinates: 39°28′10″N 121°31′08″W

Total population
- unknown

Regions with significant populations
- United States (California)

Languages
- English, traditionally Concow and Maidu

Related ethnic groups
- other Concow and Maidu people

Location of Mooretown Rancheria

The Mooretown Rancheria of Maidu Indians (Northwest Maidu: c’ici:) of California is a federally recognized tribe of Concow and Maidu people in Butte County. Concow, or Konkow, people are the northwestern or foothill branch of the Maidu people, who traditionally spoke the Concow language

== Government ==
Mooretown Rancheria is headquartered in Oroville, California. The tribe is governed by a democratically elected, tribal council, and the current tribal chairperson is Ben Clark.

== History ==
https://mooretowndistributees.com/, Original Mooretown Distributees. All records are from BIA FOIA request.

== Education ==
The ranchería is served by the Palermo Union Elementary School District and Oroville Union High School District.

== Reservation ==
The Mooretown Rancheria is a federally recognized ranchería with an area of 109 acres. It is located in the community of Oroville East, in suburban Oroville. Other nearby communities include South Oroville and Palermo.

== Economic development ==
The tribe owns and operates the Feather Falls Casino, Feather Falls Casino Brewing Company, The Lodge at Feather Falls Casino, KOA Kampground, Feather Falls Mini Mart, and the Feather Smoke Shop, all located in Oroville.

== See also ==
- Indigenous peoples of California
