= Robinson Mill =

Robinson Mill can refer to:

- Robinson Mills, California, an unincorporated community known also as Robinson Mill
- Robinson Mill (Somerset, Kentucky), listed on the NRHP in Kentucky
- Robinson Mill (Loudon, Tennessee), listed on the NRHP in Tennessee
