= O23 =

O23 or O-23 may refer to:

- HNLMS O 23, a submarine of the Royal Netherlands Navy
- Osim International, a Singaporean company
- Oxygen-23, an isotope of oxygen
- Ranchaero Airport, in Butte County, California, United States; assigned FAA LID O23 until 2009
- Thomas-Morse O-23, an observation aircraft of the United States Army Air Corps
