= Clipper Mill =

Clipper Mill may refer to the following places in the United States:

- Clipper Mills, California
- Woodberry, Baltimore, Maryland
