= Oroville City Elementary School District =

School district in California, United States

Address
- 2795 Yard Street Oroville, California, 95966; United States

District information
- Type: Public
- Grades: K–12
- Schools: 8
- NCES District ID: 0629100

Students and staff
- Students: 2,155
- Teachers: 108.17 (FTE)
- Staff: 141.8 (FTE)
- Student–teacher ratio: 19.92

Other information
- Website: www.ocesd.net

Oroville City Elementary School District is a public school district in Butte County, California, United States.

The district consists of eight schools: Sierra Del Oro Preschool for Special Needs Students; five elementary schools: Bird Street Elementary School, Oakdale Heights Elementary School, Ophir Elementary School, Stanford Avenue Elementary School, and Wyandotte Academy; and two middle schools/junior high schools: Central Middle School and Ishi Hills Middle School.

== Boundary ==
The district includes much of the municipality of Oroville, as well as all of the Robinson Mill census-designated place, most of the following CDPs: Kelly Ridge, Oroville East, and South Oroville, and a portion of Palermo CDP.
