= Kelly Ridge, California =

Kelly Ridge
- census-designated place
- Location of Kelly Ridge in Butte County, California.

- Position in California.
- Coordinates: 39°31′34″N 121°28′01″W
- Country: United States
- State: California
- County: Butte

Area
  - Total: 1.951 sq mi (5.054 km^{2})
  - Land: 1.951 sq mi (5.054 km^{2})
  - Water: 0 sq mi (0 km^{2}) 0%
- Elevation: 1,050 ft (320 m)

Population (2020)
  - Total: 3,006
  - Density: 1,540/sq mi (594.8/km^{2})
- Time zone: UTC-8 (Pacific (PST))
  - Summer (DST): UTC-7 (PDT)
- GNIS feature ID: 2612483

Kelly Ridge is a census-designated place in Butte County, northern California, United States. The 2020 United States census reported Kelly Ridge's population was 3,006.

== Geography ==
Kelly Ridge sits at an elevation of 1050 feet (320 m), on a ridge above Lake Oroville reservoir in the Sierra Nevada foothills. The community of Kelly Ridge offers direct access to boating, camping, fishing and a variety of water sports. This neighborhood is closely connected to the city of Oroville and is a popular place to retire and enjoy the outdoors.

== Demographics ==
Historical population
Census	Pop.	Note	%±
2010	2,544		—
2020	3,006		18.2%
U.S. Decennial Census; 2010

Kelly Ridge first appeared as a census designated place in the 2010 U.S. census formed from part of the Oroville East CDP.

=== 2020 census ===
As of the 2020 census, Kelly Ridge had a population of 3,006. The population density was 1,540.7 inhabitants per square mile (594.9/km^{2}). Of residents, 99.7% lived in urban areas and 0.3% lived in rural areas.

The age distribution was 15.2% under the age of 18, 6.0% aged 18 to 24, 18.5% aged 25 to 44, 26.2% aged 45 to 64, and 34.1% who were 65 years of age or older. The median age was 55.3 years. For every 100 females, there were 97.6 males, and for every 100 females age 18 and over, there were 95.6 males age 18 and over.

The whole population lived in households. There were 1,307 households, out of which 21.6% included children under the age of 18, 43.3% were married-couple households, 10.3% were cohabiting couple households, 29.3% had a female householder with no partner present, and 17.1% had a male householder with no partner present. 28.0% of households were one person, and 18.1% were one person aged 65 or older. The average household size was 2.3. There were 828 families (63.4% of all households).

There were 1,432 housing units at an average density of 734.0 units per square mile (283.4 units/km^{2}), of which 1,307 (91.3%) were occupied. Of these, 79.5% were owner-occupied, and 20.5% were occupied by renters. 8.7% of housing units were vacant; the homeowner vacancy rate was 3.5% and the rental vacancy rate was 2.9%.

Racial composition as of the 2020 census
Race	Number	Percent
White	2,407	80.1%
Black or African American	31	1.0%
American Indian and Alaska Native	83	2.8%
Asian	80	2.7%
Native Hawaiian and Other Pacific Islander	7	0.2%
Some other race	84	2.8%
Two or more races	314	10.4%
Hispanic or Latino (of any race)	329	10.9%

=== Income and poverty ===
In 2023, the US Census Bureau estimated that the median household income was $56,230, and the per capita income was $39,865. About 3.8% of families and 8.9% of the population were below the poverty line.

== Education ==
Almost all of the CDP is served by the Oroville City Elementary School District, while a small piece extends into the Thermalito Union School District. All students attend the Oroville Union High School District.
