= Rackerby, California =

Rackerby
- Census-designated place
- Location in California
- Coordinates: 39°26′23″N 121°20′29″W
- Country: United States
- State: California
- Counties: Yuba and Butte

Area
  - Total: 2.954 sq mi (7.650 km^{2})
  - Land: 2.954 sq mi (7.650 km^{2})
  - Water: 0 sq mi (0 km^{2}) 0%
- Elevation: 1,184 ft (361 m)

Population (2020)
  - Total: 210
  - Density: 71/sq mi (27/km^{2})
- Time zone: UTC-8 (Pacific (PST))
  - Summer (DST): UTC-7 (PDT)
- GNIS feature IDs: 1659452, 2612485

Rackerby (formerly, Hansonville) is a census-designated place straddling the border between Butte and Yuba counties in California, United States. It is 24 miles (39 km) north-northeast of Marysville, at an elevation of 1,184 feet (361 m). Rackerby's population was 210 at the 2020 census.

== History ==
The Rackerby post office opened in 1892 in Yuba County, moved to Butte County in 1930, and moved back in 1934. The name is in honor of William M. Rackerby, its first postmaster.

== Demographics ==
Historical population
Census	Pop.	Note	%±
2010	204		—
2020	210		2.9%
U.S. Decennial Census; 2010

Rackerby first appeared as a census designated place in the 2010 U.S. census.

The 2020 United States census reported that Rackerby had a population of 210. The population density was 71.1 inhabitants per square mile (27.5/km^{2}). The racial makeup of Rackerby was 176 (83.8%) White, 1 (0.5%) African American, 4 (1.9%) Native American, 2 (1.0%) Asian, 0 (0.0%) Pacific Islander, 2 (1.0%) from other races, and 25 (11.9%) from two or more races. Hispanic or Latino of any race were 22 persons (10.5%).

The whole population lived in households. There were 94 households, out of which 34 (36.2%) had children under the age of 18 living in them, 35 (37.2%) were married-couple households, 8 (8.5%) were cohabiting couple households, 30 (31.9%) had a female householder with no partner present, and 21 (22.3%) had a male householder with no partner present. 24 households (25.5%) were one person, and 14 (14.9%) were one person aged 65 or older. The average household size was 2.23. There were 65 families (69.1% of all households).

The age distribution was 44 people (21.0%) under the age of 18, 4 people (1.9%) aged 18 to 24, 41 people (19.5%) aged 25 to 44, 52 people (24.8%) aged 45 to 64, and 69 people (32.9%) who were 65 years of age or older. The median age was 52.5 years. There were 127 males and 83 females.

There were 103 housing units at an average density of 34.9 units per square mile (13.5 units/km^{2}), of which 94 (91.3%) were occupied. Of these, 64 (68.1%) were owner-occupied, and 30 (31.9%) were occupied by renters.

== Education ==
Rackerby is served by the Bangor Union Elementary School District and the Oroville Union High School District.
