= Butte County Board of Supervisors =

Leadership
- County Chair: Bill Connelly, Republican since January 13, 2026
- County Vice Chair: Tami Ritter, Democratic since January 13, 2026
- Supervisor, First District: Bill Connelly, Republican since January 11, 2005
- Supervisor, Second District: Peter Durfee, Republican since January 7, 2019
- Supervisor, Third District: Tami Ritter, Democratic since January 7, 2019
- Supervisor, Fourth District: Tod Kimmelshue, Republican since January 14, 2025
- Supervisor, Fifth District: Doug Teeter, Republican since January 7, 2013
- Chief Administrative Officer and Clerk of the Board: Maximo Pickett, Independent

Structure
- Seats: 5
- Political groups: Republican Party (4); Democratic Party (1)
- Length of term: 4 years
- Authority: Butte County Charter

Meeting place
- 25 County Center Drive; Oroville, CA 95965

Website
- www.buttecounty.net

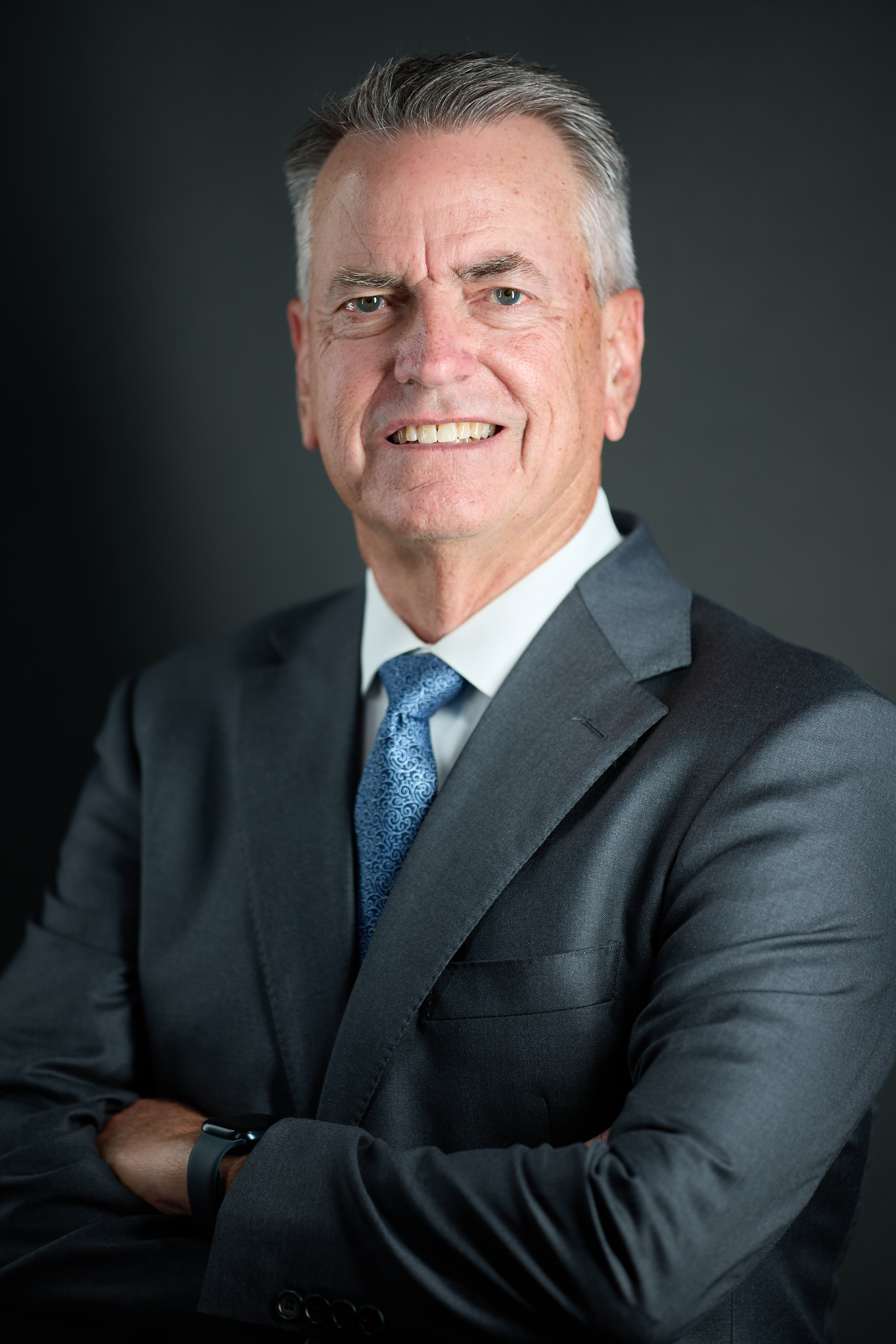
Tod Kimmelshue, chair of the Butte County Board of Supervisors, in April 2025

The Butte County Board of Supervisors is the governing body of Butte County, California. The board consists of five members elected by district for four-year terms. As of January 14, 2025, the board of supervisors consisted of Bill Connelly, Tami Ritter, Peter Durfee, Tod Kimmelshue, and Doug Teeter.
