= Lindhurst High School =

Location
- 4446 Olive Avenue; Olivehurst, California
- Coordinates: 39.0836°N 121.5366°W

Information
- Type: Public
- Established: 1975
- School district: Marysville Joint Unified School District
- Principal: Nohemí Arroyo-Magaña
- Teaching staff: 55.51 (FTE)
- Grades: 9-12
- Enrollment: 1,214 (2023–2024)
- Student to teacher ratio: 21.87
- Colors: Red, White, and Navy Blue
- Mascot: Blazer
- Website: https://lindhurst.mjusd.com/

Lindhurst High School is located in Olivehurst, California, USA. It is one of two high schools in the Marysville Joint Unified School District of Yuba County and draws students from the communities of Olivehurst, Linda, Plumas Lake, and Marysville.

== 1992 mass shooting ==
On May 1, 1992, the school saw a school shooting and subsequent siege. The gunman, 20-year-old Eric Houston, was a former student at Lindhurst High School. Houston killed three students and one teacher and wounded nine students and a teacher before surrendering to police. Houston was sentenced to death for the murders, and he is currently on California's death row in San Quentin State Prison.

It, along with the 1998 Thurston High School shooting, used to be the deadliest high school shootings in modern U.S. history until they were both surpassed by the April 1999 Columbine High School massacre.

== Notable alumni ==
- Giovanni Aguilar, soccer player, Las Vegas Lights
- D. A. Powell (class of 1981), poet, Guggenheim Fellow
