= Yankee Hill, Butte County, California =

Yankee Hill, California
- Unincorporated community
- Location in California
- Coordinates: 39°42′13″N 121°31′20″W
- Country: United States
- State: California
- County: Butte

Area
  - Total: 6.03 sq mi (15.61 km^{2})
  - Land: 6.03 sq mi (15.61 km^{2})
  - Water: 0 sq mi (0.00 km^{2})
- Elevation: 1,982 ft (604 m)

Population (2020)
  - Total: 260
  - Density: 43/sq mi (17/km^{2})
- Time zone: UTC-8 (Pacific (PST))
  - Summer (DST): UTC-7 (PDT)
- GNIS feature IDs: 1656414; 2612489

Yankee Hill (formerly, Rich Gulch and Spanishtown) is an unincorporated community and census-designated place in Butte County, California, United States. It is located 6.5 miles (10.5 km) east-southeast of Paradise, at an elevation of 1982 feet (604 m). The population was 260 at the 2020 census.

== History ==
Rich Gulch was settled in 1850. When Chilean and Spanish miners arrived in the 1850s, the place was renamed to Spanishtown. New Englanders settled later, applying the current name. A post office operated at Yankee Hill from 1858 to 1951. A modern-day post office is still in operation at the Pines Hardware Store, 11300A Miller Flat Rd. in Yankee Hill.

== Demographics ==
Historical population
Census	Pop.	Note	%±
2010	333		—
2020	260		−21.9%
U.S. Decennial Census; 2010

Yankee Hill first appeared as a census designated place in the 2010 U.S. census.

The 2020 United States census reported that Yankee Hill had a population of 260. The population density was 43.1 inhabitants per square mile (16.6/km^{2}). The racial makeup of Yankee Hill was 191 (73.5%) White, 14 (5.4%) African American, 8 (3.1%) Native American, 7 (2.7%) Asian, 2 (0.8%) Pacific Islander, 10 (3.8%) from other races, and 28 (10.8%) from two or more races. Hispanic or Latino of any race were 32 persons (12.3%).

The census reported that 100% of the population lived in households. There were 115 households, out of which 15 (13.0%) included children under the age of 18, 40 (34.8%) were married-couple households, 15 (13.0%) were cohabiting couple households, 15 (13.0%) had a female householder with no partner present, and 45 (39.1%) had a male householder with no partner present. 38 households (33.0%) were one person, and 14 (12.2%) were one person aged 65 or older. The average household size was 2.26. There were 64 families (55.6% of all households).

The age distribution was 39 people (15.0%) under the age of 18, 27 people (10.4%) aged 18 to 24, 59 people (22.7%) aged 25 to 44, 72 people (27.7%) aged 45 to 64, and 63 people (24.2%) who were 65 years of age or older. The median age was 47.5 years. There were 124 males and 136 females.

There were 140 housing units at an average density of 23.2 units per square mile (9.0 units/km^{2}), of which 115 (82.1%) were occupied. Of these, 104 (90.4%) were owner-occupied, and 11 (9.6%) were occupied by renters.

== Education ==
Yankee Hill is served by the Golden Feather Union Elementary School District and the Oroville Union High School District.
