= Sacramento River National Wildlife Refuge =

Wildlife refuge in California

- IUCN category IV (habitat/species management area)
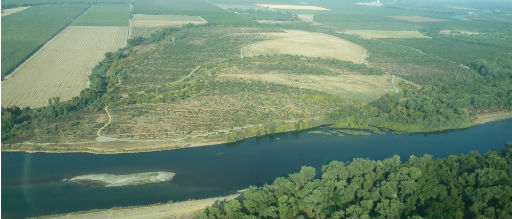

- Location within California Location within the United States
- Location: Butte County, Glenn County, Tehama County, California, United States
- Nearest city: Chico, California
- Coordinates: 39°42′25″N 121°57′15″W
- Area: 10,146 acres (41.06 km^{2})
- Established: 1989
- Governing body: U.S. Fish and Wildlife Service
- Website: Sacramento River National Wildlife Refuge

Sacramento River National Wildlife Refuge is located along the Sacramento River in the Sacramento Valley of California. Landscape is very flat, bordered by the Sierra and Coast ranges, with intensive agriculture (rice, with walnut, almond, and prune orchards along the river). This riparian community is one of the most important wildlife habitats in California and North America.

The refuge is currently in an active acquisition phase, and includes the Llano Seco Unit. Large-scale riparian habitat restoration is ongoing. Riparian habitat along the Sacramento River is critically important for various threatened species, fisheries, migratory birds, plants, and the natural system of the river itself.

== Restoration ==
There has been an 85% reduction of riparian vegetation throughout the Sacramento Valley and foothills region, and probably over a 95 percent reduction along this area's major river systems. The relatively small amount of Riparian forest woodlands that remains provides a strikingly disproportionate amount of habitat value for wildlife.
