= Marysville Joint Unified School District =

School district in California, United States

Address
- 1919 B Street Marysville, California, 95901; United States

District information
- Type: Public
- Grades: K–12
- NCES District ID: 0624090

Students and staff
- Students: 9,733
- Teachers: 428.49
- Staff: 551.04
- Student–teacher ratio: 22.71

Other information
- Website: www.mjusd.com

Marysville Joint Unified School District (MJUSD) is a school district in California, United States, headquartered in Marysville.

== Boundary ==
It includes areas of Yuba County, including the municipality of Marysville, as well as the following census-designated places: Challenge-Brownsville, Dobbins, Linda, Loma Rica, Olivehurst, and a part of Plumas Lake. The district extends into Butte County, where it covers Clipper Mills and Forbestown.

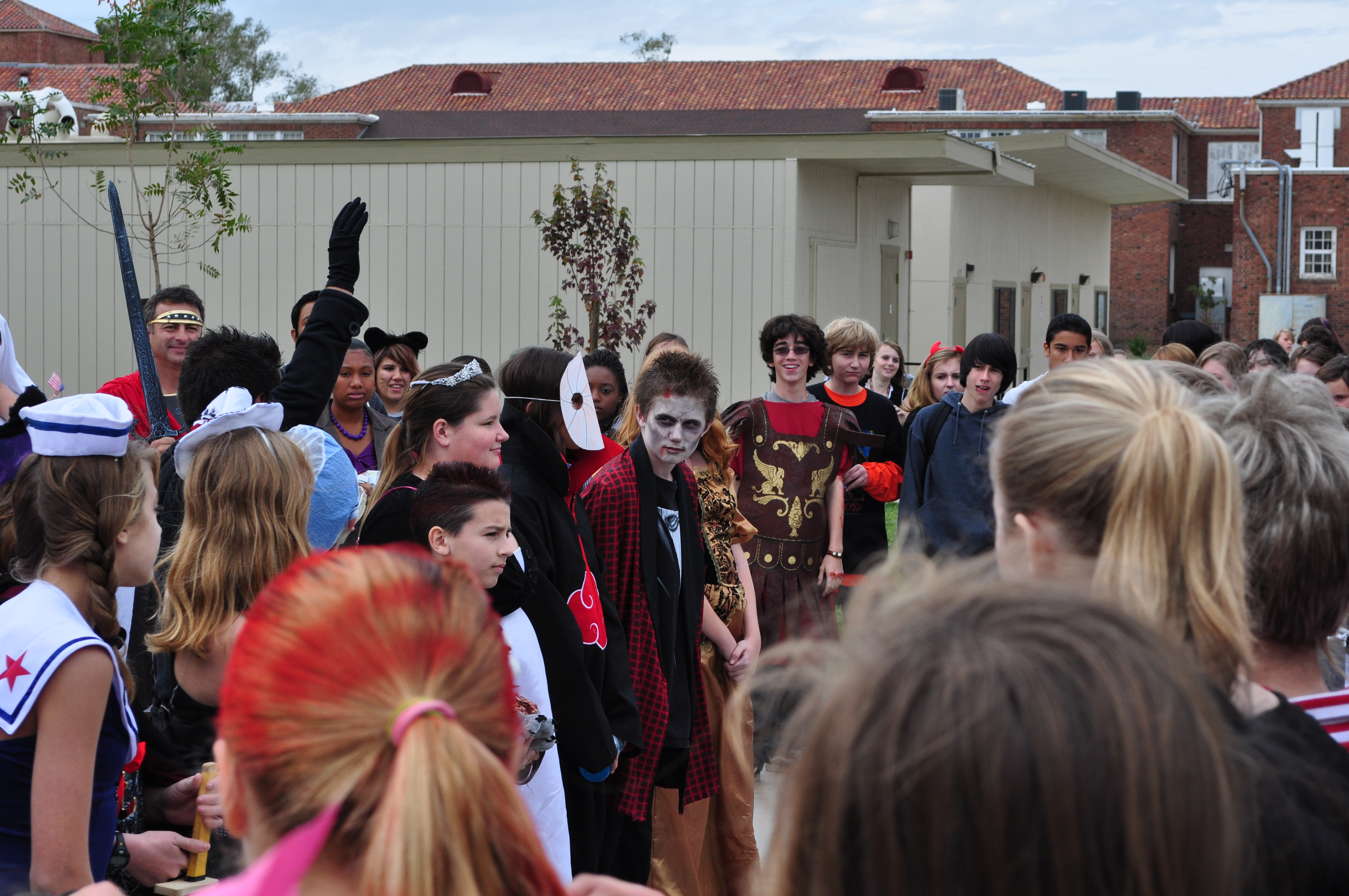
Students celebrate spirit week during halloween

== History ==
In 2003 Marysville JUSD gave territory to Plumas Elementary School District and Wheatland Union High School District.

== Schools ==
=== High schools ===
- Lindhurst High School, Olivehurst/Linda
- Marysville High School

=== Intermediate ===
- Foothill Intermediate School, Loma Rica
- McKenny Intermediate School, Marysville
- Yuba Gardens Intermediate School, Olivehurst

=== Elementary ===
- Arboga
- Browns Valley
- Cedar Lane, Linda
- Cordua, Hallwood
- Covillaud, Marysville
- Dobbins
- Edgewater, Linda
- Ella, Olivehurst
- Johnson Park, Olivehurst
- Kynoch, Marysville
- Linda
- Loma Rica
- Olivehurst
- Yuba Feather, Challenge

=== Other Programs ===
- Abraham Lincoln Alternative/Independent Study
- Marysville Charter Academy for the Arts
