= Butte County, California =

County in California, United States

Coordinates: 39.66°N 121.60°W

Butte County
- County
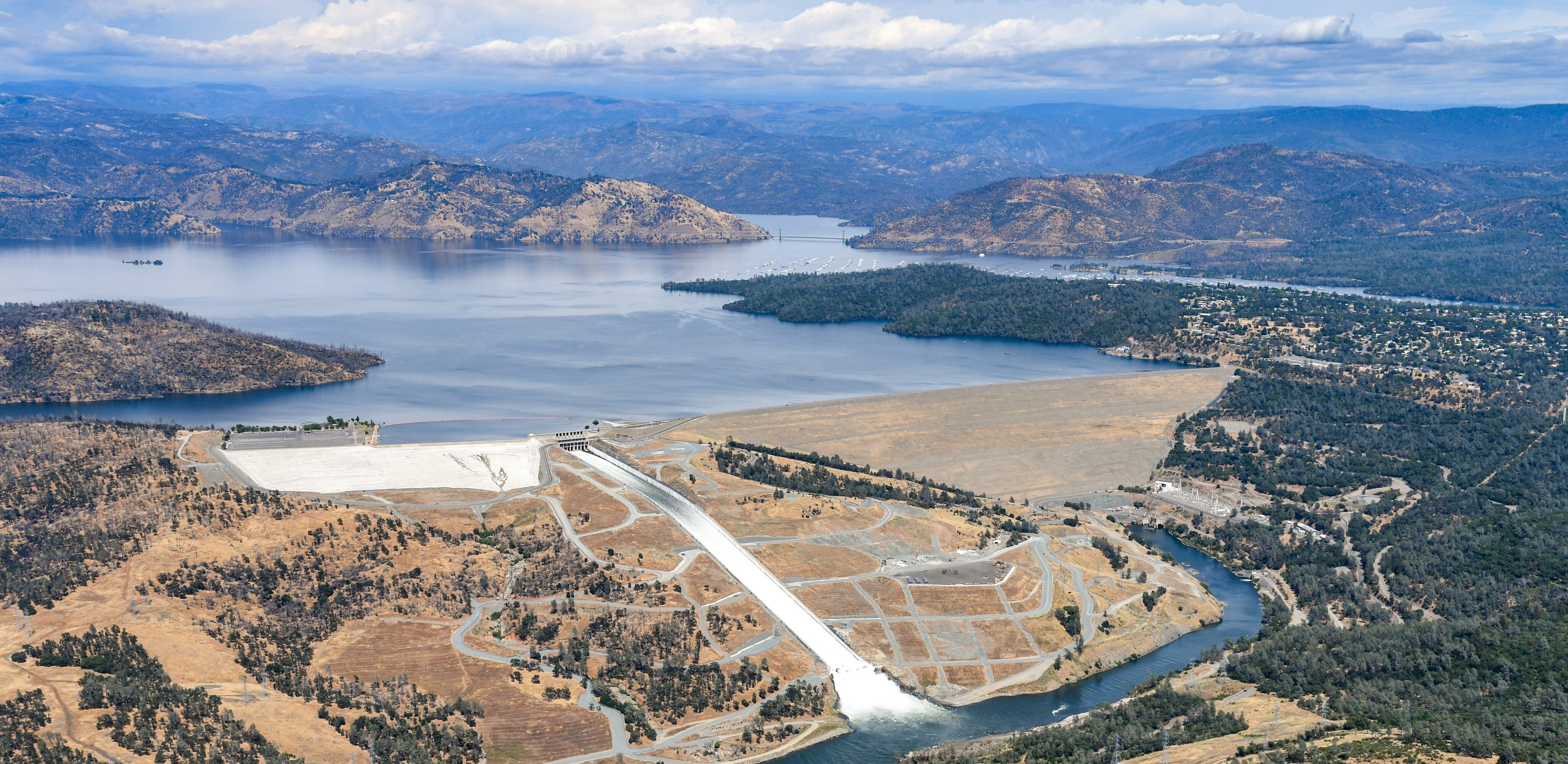
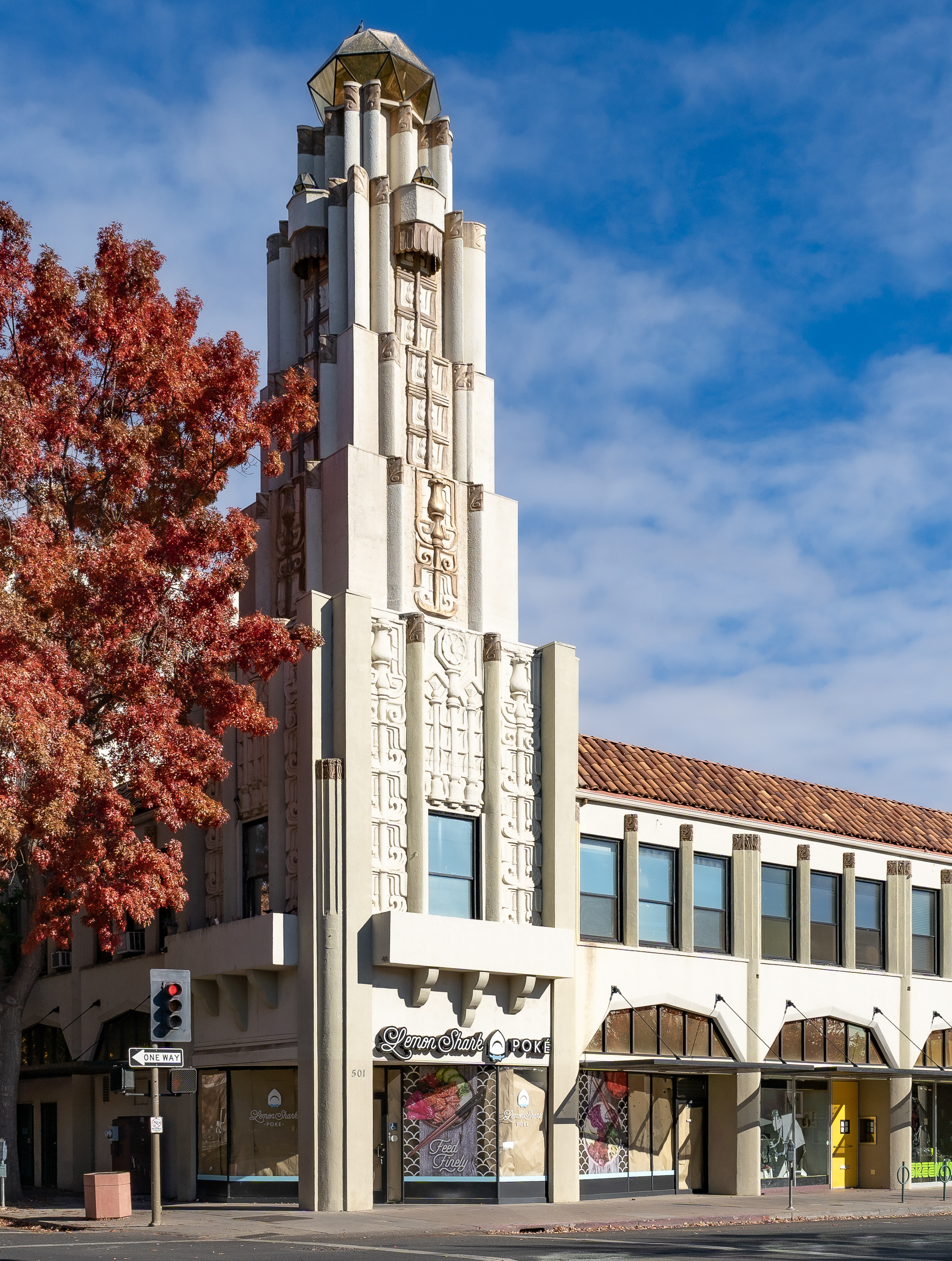
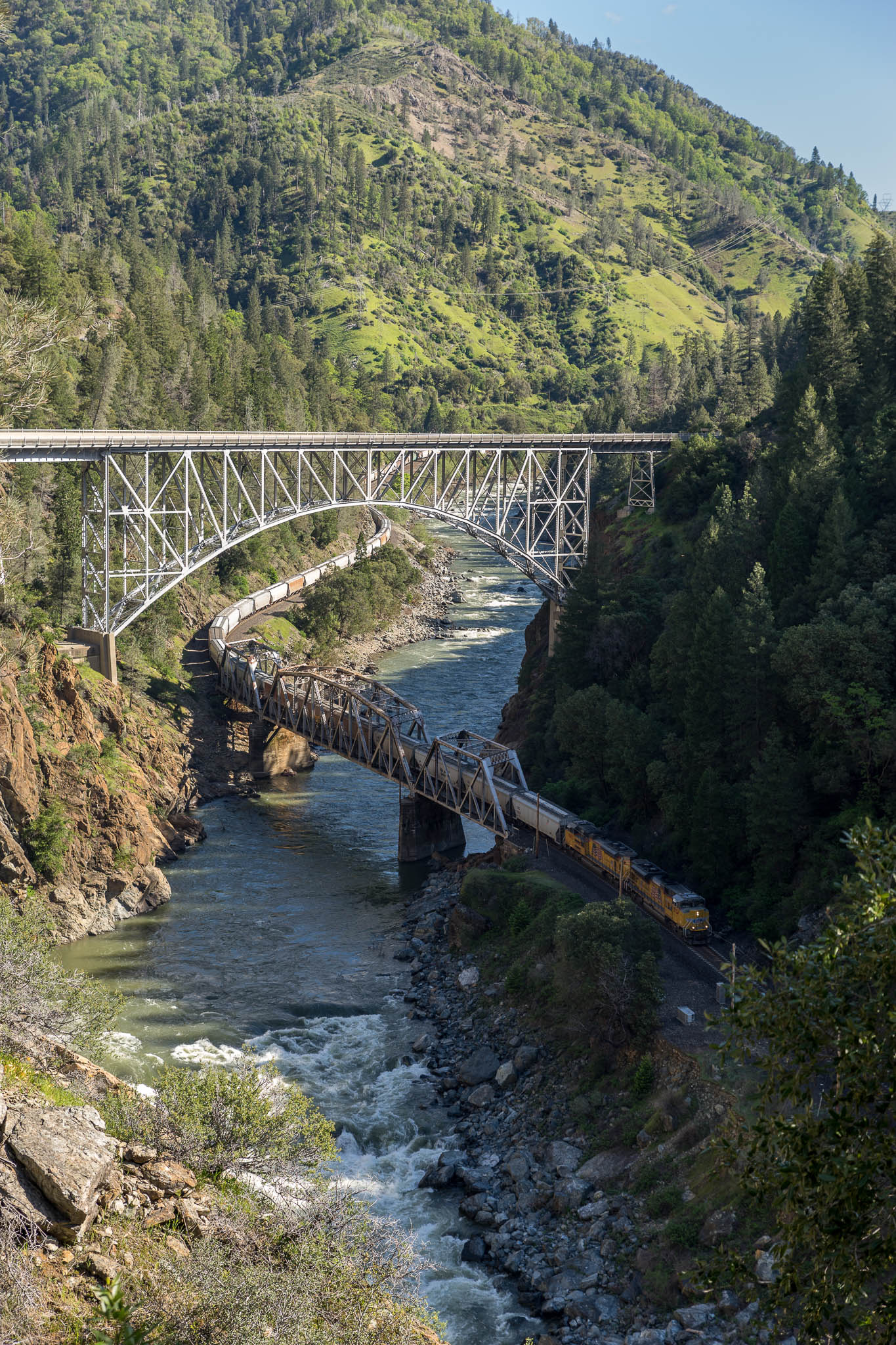
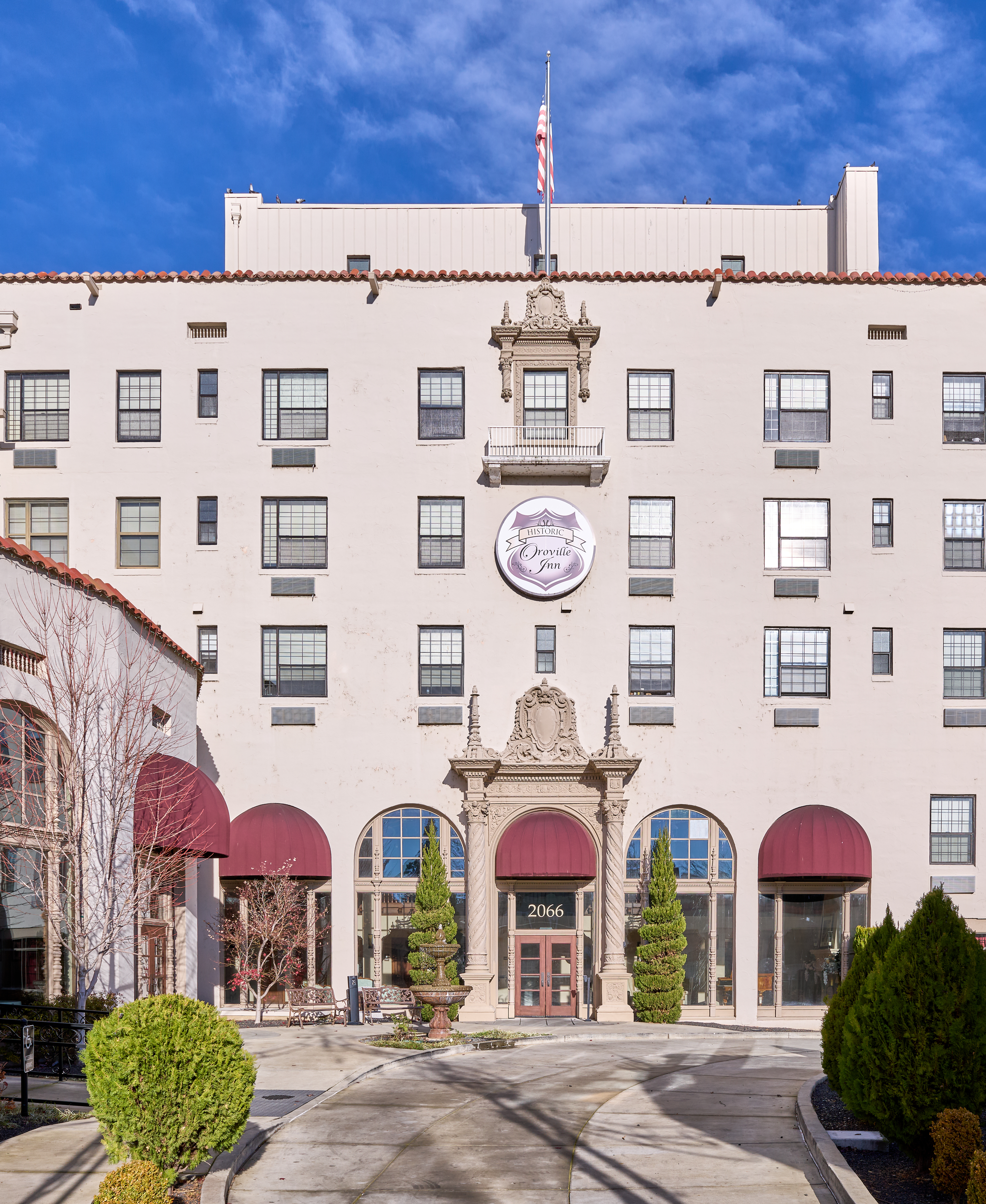
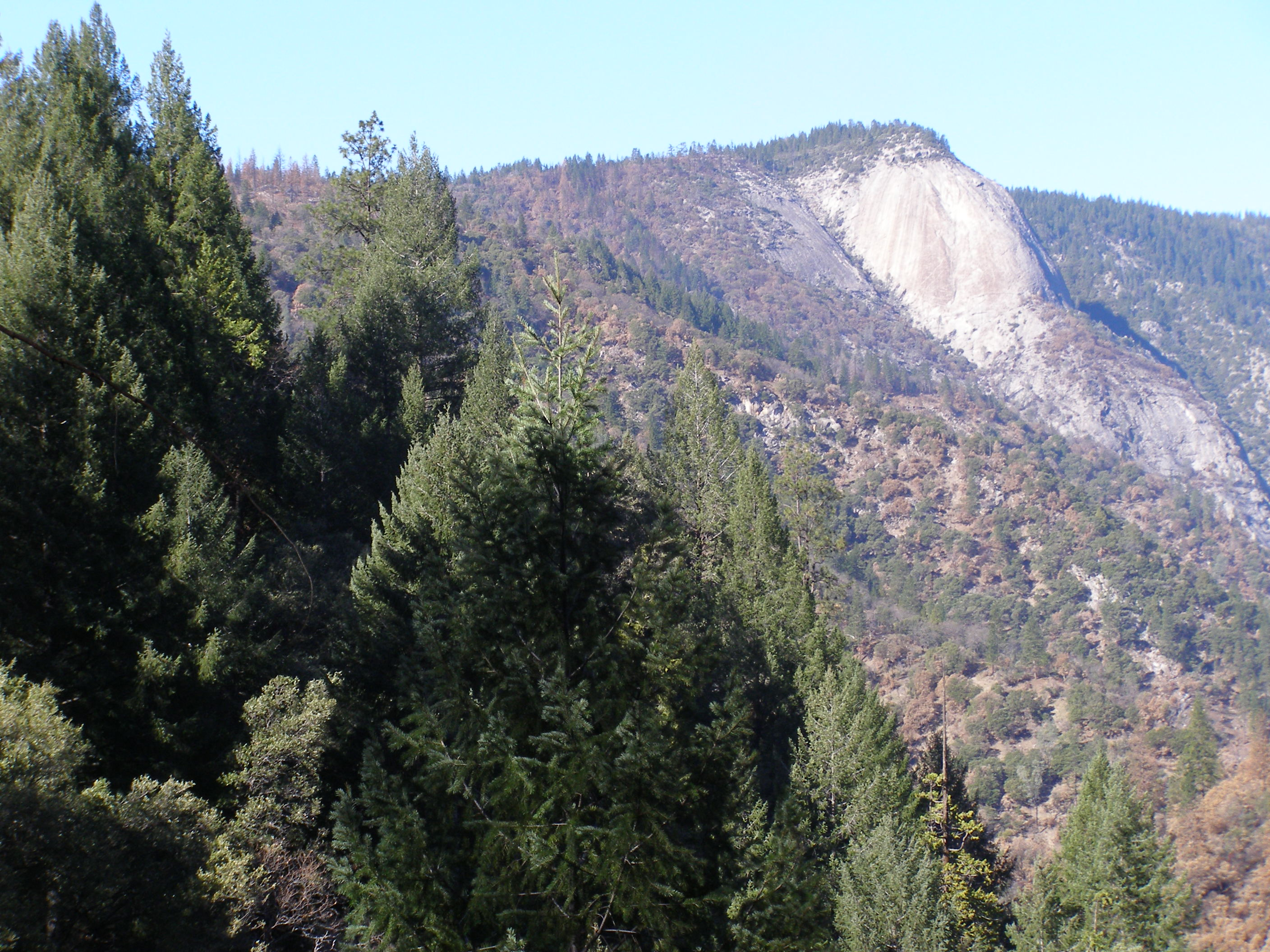
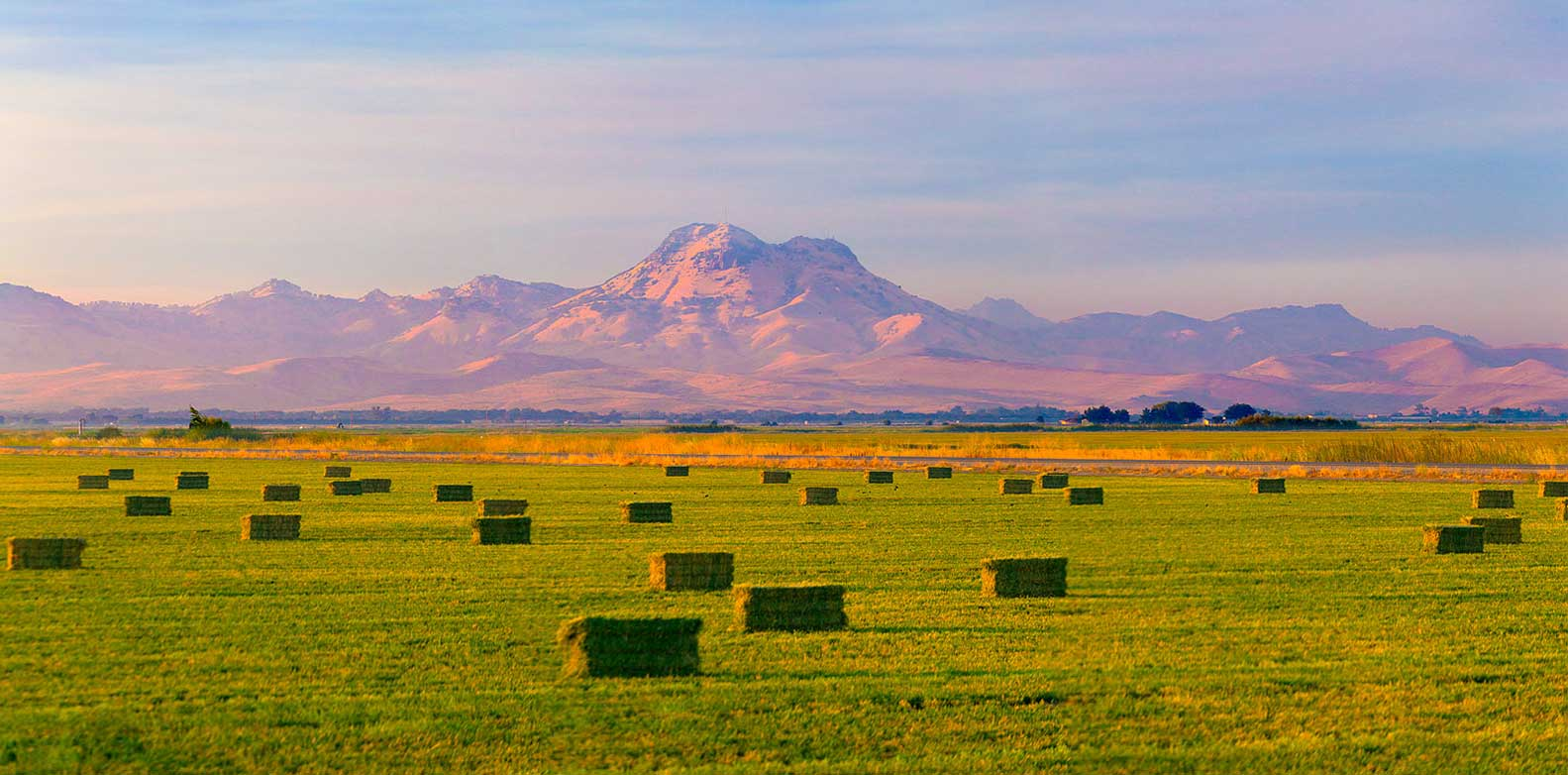
- Lake Oroville and Oroville Dam Chico Feather River Oroville Bald Rock Dome Gridley

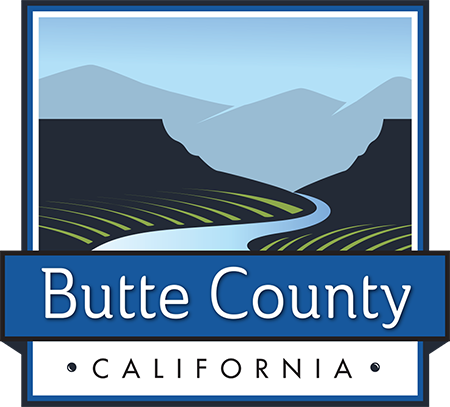
- Flag Seal Wordmark
- Nickname: "The Land of Natural Wealth and Beauty"
- Interactive map of Butte County
- Location in the state of California
- Country: United States
- State: California
- Region: Shasta Cascade & Sacramento Valley
- Incorporated: February 18, 1850
- Named for: The nearby Sutter Buttes
- County seat: Oroville
- Largest city: Chico

Government
  - Type: Council–CAO
  - Chair: Bill Connelly
  - Vice Chair: Tami Ritter
  - Board of Supervisors: Supervisors: Bill Connelly; Peter Durfee; Tami Ritter; Tod Kimmelshue; Doug Teeter
  - Chief Administrative Officer: Andy Pickett

Area
  - Total: 1,677 sq mi (4,340 km^{2})
  - Land: 1,636 sq mi (4,240 km^{2})
  - Water: 41 sq mi (110 km^{2})
- Highest elevation: 7,124 ft (2,171 m)

Population (2020)
  - Total: 211,632
  - Estimate (2025): 209,211 ▼
  - Density: 129.4/sq mi (49.95/km^{2})

GDP
  - Total: $11.077 billion (2022)
- Time zone: UTC−8 (Pacific Time Zone)
  - Summer (DST): UTC−7 (Pacific Daylight Time)
- Area code: 530
- FIPS code: 06-007
- GNIS feature ID: 1675842
- Congressional district: 1st
- Website: www.buttecounty.net

Butte County (/ˈbjuːt/) is a county located in the northern central part of the U.S. state of California. In the 2020 census, its population was 211,632. The county seat is Oroville.

Butte County comprises the Chico, California, metropolitan statistical area. It is in the California Central Valley, north of the state capital of Sacramento.

Butte County is drained by the Feather River and the Sacramento River. Butte Creek and Big Chico Creek are additional perennial streams, both tributary to the Sacramento. The county is home to California State University, Chico and Butte College.

== History ==
Butte County is named for the visually striking +2,000-foot (610 m) Sutter Buttes in neighboring Sutter County. Butte County was incorporated as one of California's 27 original counties on February 18, 1850. The county went across the present limits of the Tehama, Plumas, Colusa, and Sutter Counties. Suffragists from Butte County including Minnie Sharkey Abrams played a notable role in the women's suffrage campaign in 1911.

Between November 8 and 25, 2018, a major wildfire, the Camp Fire, destroyed most of the town of Paradise, the adjacent community of Concow, and a large area of rural, hilly country east of Chico. More than 80 people were killed, 50,000 were displaced, over 150,000 acres were burned, and nearly 20,000 buildings were destroyed. The Camp Fire was California's most destructive and deadliest fire.

On July 24, 2024, the Park Fire ignited in Bidwell Park, four miles south of downtown Chico. Ronnie Dean Stout II, a Chico resident, has been accused of arson for starting the fire by allegedly pushing a car that was on fire down an embankment. Over the course of the next 64 days, the fire expanded into Tehama County, burned 429,603 acres, killed one person, and destroyed 709 structures. It became the largest wildfire caused by arson in the state's history, the fourth largest fire in the state's history, the largest fire of the 2024 California wildfire season, and the second largest single fire in the state's history (as opposed to a complex fire, with multiple ignition points).

== Geography ==
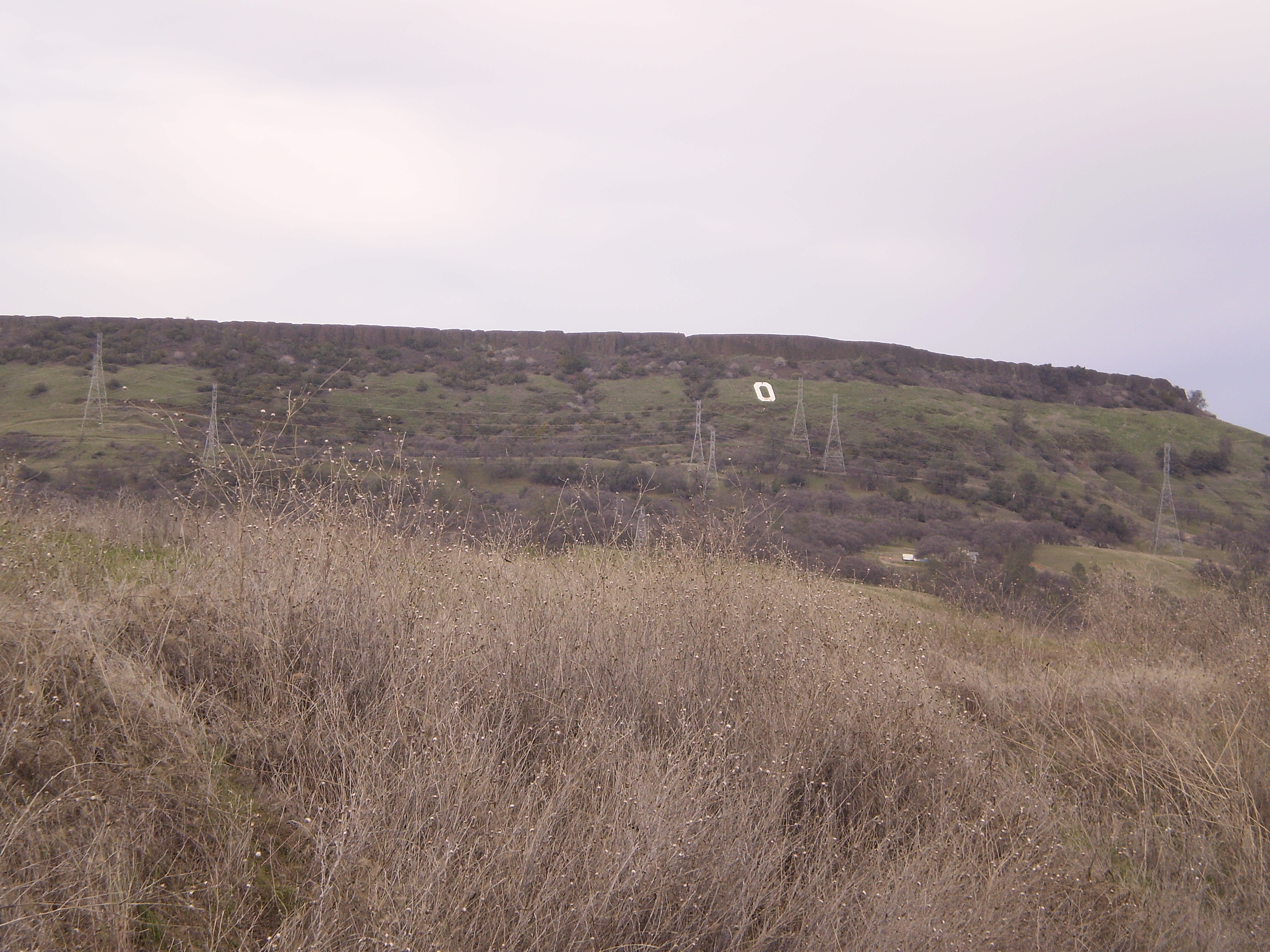
South Table Mountain Near Oroville

According to the U.S. Census Bureau, the county has a total area of 1,677 square miles (4,340 km^{2}), of which 41 square miles (110 km^{2}) (2.4%) are covered by water.

The county is drained by the Feather River and Butte Creek. Part of the county's western border is formed by the Sacramento River. The county lies along the western slope of the Sierra Nevada, the steep slopes making it prime territory for the siting of hydroelectric power plants. About a half dozen of these plants are located in the county, one of which, serves the Oroville Dam.

=== National protected areas ===
- Butte Sink National Wildlife Refuge (part)
- Lassen National Forest (part)
- Plumas National Forest (part)
- Sacramento River National Wildlife Refuge (part)

=== Adjacent counties ===
- Sutter County – south
- Colusa County – southwest
- Glenn County – west
- Tehama County – northwest
- Plumas County – northeast
- Yuba County – southeast

== Demographics ==
Historical population
Census	Pop.	Note	%±
1850	3,574		—
1860	12,106		238.7%
1870	11,403		−5.8%
1880	18,721		64.2%
1890	17,939		−4.2%
1900	17,117		−4.6%
1910	27,301		59.5%
1920	30,030		10.0%
1930	34,093		13.5%
1940	42,840		25.7%
1950	64,930		51.6%
1960	82,030		26.3%
1970	101,969		24.3%
1980	143,851		41.1%
1990	182,120		26.6%
2000	203,171		11.6%
2010	219,951		8.3%
2020	211,632		−3.8%
2025 (est.)	209,211	▼	−1.1%
U.S. Decennial Census; 1790–1960 1900–1990; 1990–2000 2010 2020

=== 2020 census ===
As of the 2020 census, Butte County had a population of 211,632. The median age was 37.9 years, 20.5% of residents were under the age of 18, and 19.0% were 65 years of age or older. For every 100 females there were 97.8 males, and for every 100 females age 18 and over there were 96.3 males age 18 and over.

79.0% of residents lived in urban areas, while 21.0% lived in rural areas.

There were 83,268 households in the county, of which 27.2% had children under the age of 18 living with them and 28.7% had a female householder with no spouse or partner present. About 28.3% of all households were made up of individuals and 12.6% had someone living alone who was 65 years of age or older.

The county's population was 70.7% White, 1.7% Black or African American, 2.1% American Indian and Alaska Native, 5.0% Asian, 0.3% Native Hawaiian and Pacific Islander, 8.6% from some other race, and 11.7% from two or more races; Hispanic or Latino residents of any race comprised 19.0% of the population.

There were 90,133 housing units, of which 7.6% were vacant. Among occupied housing units, 56.2% were owner-occupied and 43.8% were renter-occupied. The homeowner vacancy rate was 1.5% and the rental vacancy rate was 4.7%.

=== Racial and ethnic composition ===
Butte County, California – Racial and ethnic composition Note: the US Census treats Hispanic/Latino as an ethnic category. This table excludes Latinos from the racial categories and assigns them to a separate category. Hispanics/Latinos may be of any race.
Race / Ethnicity (NH = Non-Hispanic)	Pop 1980	Pop 1990	Pop 2000	Pop 2010	Pop 2020	% 1980	% 1990	% 2000	% 2010	% 2020
White alone (NH)	130,522	158,242	162,564	165,416	139,651	90.73%	86.89%	80.01%	75.19%	65.99%
Black or African American alone (NH)	1,686	2,238	2,699	3,133	3,320	1.17%	1.23%	1.33%	1.42%	1.57%
Native American or Alaska Native alone (NH)	2,062	2,946	3,295	3,395	3,050	1.43%	1.62%	1.62%	1.54%	1.44%
Asian alone (NH)	1,287	4,961	6,676	8,921	10,333	0.89%	2.72%	3.29%	4.06%	4.88%
Native Hawaiian or Pacific Islander alone (NH)	x	x	273	401	508	x	x	0.13%	0.18%	0.24%
Other race alone (NH)	752	127	435	318	1,184	0.52%	0.07%	0.21%	0.14%	0.56%
Mixed race or Multiracial (NH)	x	x	5,890	7,300	13,474	x	x	2.90%	3.32%	6.37%
Hispanic or Latino (any race)	7,542	13,606	21,339	31,116	40,112	5.24%	7.47%	10.50%	14.14%	18.95%
Total	143,851	182,120	203,171	220,000	211,632	100.00%	100.00%	100.00%	100.00%	100.00%

=== American Community Survey 2025 data ===
The United States Census Bureau estimated that in 2025, Butte County’s population was 209.211. It was also estimated that the county's population was 63,20% Non-Hispanic White, 21,83% Hispanic or Latino, 1,81% Non-Hispanic Black, 5,69% Asian, 1,45% Native American, 0,26% Pacific Islander, and 5,76% Multiracial.

Total	Population	Percentage
Non-Hispanic White	132.229	63,20%
Hispanic or Latino	45.662	21,83%
Non-Hispanic Black	3.787	1,81%
Asian	11.912	5,69%
Native American	3.026	1,45%
Pacific Islander	540	0,26%
Non-Hispanic Multiracial	12.055	5,76%

=== 2010 Census ===
The 2010 United States census reported that Butte County had a population of 220,000. The racial makeup of Butte County was 180,096 (81.9%) White, 3,415 (1.6%) African American, 4,395 (2.0%) Native American, 9,057 (4.1%) Asian, 452 (0.2%) Pacific Islander, 12,141 (5.5%) from other races, and 10,444 (4.7%) from two or more races. Hispanics or Latinos of any race were 31,116 persons (14.1%).

Population reported at 2010 United States census
The County	Total; Population	White	African; American	Native; American	Asian	Pacific; Islander	other races	two or more races	Hispanic or Latino (of any race)
Butte County	220,000	180,096	3,415	4,395	9,057	452	12,141	10,444	31,116
Incorporated cities and towns	Total; Population	White	African; American	Native; American	Asian	Pacific; Islander	other races	two or more races	Hispanic or Latino (of any race)
Biggs	1,707	1,302	11	54	9	1	252	78	580
Chico	86,187	69,606	1,771	1,167	3,656	210	5,437	4,340	15,000
Gridley	6,584	4,283	55	98	249	3	1,552	344	3,000
Oroville	15,546	11,686	453	573	1,238	56	554	986	1,945
Paradise	26,218	24,129	112	301	330	24	416	906	1,836
Census-designated places	Total; Population	White	African; American	Native; American	Asian	Pacific; Islander	other races	two or more races	Hispanic or Latino (of any race)
Bangor	646	543	5	17	4	1	18	58	47
Berry Creek	1,424	1,249	8	48	13	3	13	90	98
Butte Creek Canyon	1,086	1,011	0	20	18	1	8	28	48
Butte Meadows	40	38	0	0	0	0	0	2	0
Butte Valley	899	782	0	19	9	1	42	46	89
Cherokee	69	48	0	2	8	0	0	11	1
Clipper Mills	142	131	0	3	0	0	2	6	5
Cohasset	847	764	8	14	2	1	20	38	43
Concow	710	611	0	24	5	3	10	57	56
Durham	5,518	5,088	19	55	35	9	165	147	614
Forbestown	320	262	4	15	10	0	4	25	23
Forest Ranch	1,184	1,116	8	6	4	1	20	29	52
Honcut	370	248	6	14	4	0	85	13	145
Kelly Ridge	2,544	2,287	20	56	35	7	43	96	204
Magalia	11,310	10,398	40	141	90	17	134	490	765
Nord	320	233	1	6	16	0	48	16	122
Oroville East	8,280	6,830	126	477	294	8	147	398	702
Palermo	5,382	3,901	39	221	246	4	642	329	1,281
Rackerby	204	193	0	1	0	0	3	7	18
Richvale	244	216	0	11	0	0	10	7	27
Robinson Mill	80	74	0	1	0	1	0	4	11
South Oroville	5,742	3,407	406	245	885	9	361	429	851
Stirling City	295	264	1	11	0	0	1	18	17
Thermalito	6,646	4,594	61	257	1,102	37	270	325	713
Yankee Hill	333	305	2	7	4	0	5	10	22
Other unincorporated areas	Total; Population	White	African; American	Native; American	Asian	Pacific; Islander	other races	two or more races	Hispanic or Latino (of any race)
All others not CDPs (combined)	29,123	24,497	259	531	791	55	1,879	1,111	4,486

=== 2000 ===
As of the census of 2000, there were 203,171 people, 79,566 households, and 49,410 families residing in the county. The population density was 124 people per square mile (48 people/km^{2}). There were 85,523 housing units at an average density of 52 per square mile (20/km^{2}). The racial makeup of the county was 84.5% White, 10.5% of the population were Hispanic or Latino, 3.3% Asian, 1.9% Native American, 1.4% Black or African American, 0.2% Pacific Islander, 4.8% from other races, and 3.9% from two or more races. 87.9% spoke English, 7.8% Spanish and 1.4% Hmong as their first language.

There were 79,566 households, out of which 28.4% had children under the age of 18 living with them, 46.7% were married couples living together, 11.2% had a female householder with no husband present, and 37.9% were non-families. 27.2% of all households were made up of individuals, and 11.1% had someone living alone who was 65 years of age or older. The average household size was 2.48 and the average family size was 3.02.

In the county, the population was spread out, with 24.0% under the age of 18, 13.6% from 18 to 24, 24.8% from 25 to 44, 21.8% from 45 to 64, and 15.8% who were 65 years of age or older. The median age was 36 years. For every 100 females there were 96.1 males. For every 100 females age 18 and over, there were 92.6 males.

The median income for a household in the county was $31,924, and the median income for a family was $41,010. Males had a median income of $34,137 versus $25,393 for females. The per capita income for the county was $17,517. About 12.2% of families and 19.8% of the population were below the poverty line, including 23.8% of those under age 18 and 7.3% of those age 65 or over.

== Health and crime ==
There are four major hospitals and the State of California defines Butte County as being inside Health Service Area 1. A special district, the Butte County Air Quality Management District, regulates airborne pollutant emissions in the county. It does this following regional regulations, state, and federal laws. For example, in recent years, the agency changed rules that once allowed residents to burn household trash outdoors.

The following table includes the number of incidents reported and the rate per 1,000 persons for each type of offense.

Population and crime rates
Population	220,000	
Violent crime	970	4.25
Homicide	20	0.05
Forcible rape	100	0.40
Robbery	200	0.85
Aggravated assault	650	2.95
Property crime	5,524	16.32
Burglary	1,733	7.90
Larceny-theft (Note: Only larceny-theft cases involving property over $400 in value are reported as property crimes.)	3,765	17.17
Motor vehicle theft	840	3.83
Arson	81	0.37

=== Cities by population and crime rates ===
Cities by population and crime rates
City	Population	Violent crimes	Violent crime rate per 1,000 persons	Property crimes	Property crime rate per 1,000 persons
Biggs	1,707	24	11.02	30	19.72
Chico	90,000	317	3.24	3,634	26.31
Gridley	6,600	113	11.72	196	33.06
Oroville	16,000	108	6.81	1,143	63.09
Paradise	26,492	52	2.49	521	18.08

== Government ==
=== Law enforcement ===
Butte County Sheriff's Office
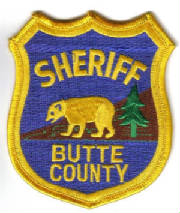
- Abbreviation: BCSO

Operational structure
- Headquarters: Oroville, California
- Sheriff responsible: Kory Honea

Facilities
- Jails: 1

Website
- Official website

The Butte County Sheriff's Office provides general-service law enforcement to unincorporated areas of Butte County, serving as the equivalent of the county police for unincorporated areas of the county as well as incorporated cities within the county who have contracted with the agency for law-enforcement services (known as "contract cities" in local jargon). It also holds primary jurisdiction over facilities operated by Butte County, such as local parks, marinas and government buildings; provides marshal service for the Butte County Superior Court; operates the county jail system; and provides services such as laboratories and academy training to smaller law enforcement agencies within the county. The first sheriff of Butte County was Joseph Q. Wilbur. Kory Honea has been the sheriff since 2014.

=== Voter registration statistics ===
Population and registered voters
Total eligible population	164,755	
Registered voters (Note: Percentage of registered voters with respect to total population. Percentages of party members with respect to registered voters follow.)	123,935	75.2%
Democratic	43,407	26.3%
Republican	44,362	26.9%
Democratic–Republican spread	-955	-0.6%
American Independent	5,920	3.5%
Libertarian	2,037	1.2%
Green	759	0.4%
Peace and Freedom	633	0.3%
Unknown	896	0.5%
Other	1,051	0.6%
No party preference	24,870	15.0%

==== Cities by population and voter registration ====
Cities by population and voter registration
City	Population	Registered voters	Democratic	Republican	D–R spread	Other	No party preference
Biggs	1,927	38.7%	36.7%	37.9%	-1.2%	8.8%	19.8%
Chico	85,605	55.0%	40.1%	30.3%	+9.8%	9.8%	22.7%
Gridley	6,509	40.6%	37.6%	34.8%	+2.8%	9.7%	21.3%
Oroville	15,445	40.8%	32.1%	36.2%	-4.1%	11.7%	24.2%
Paradise	26,348	62.1%	31.1%	40.8%	-9.7%	11.5%	20.5%

=== Local ===
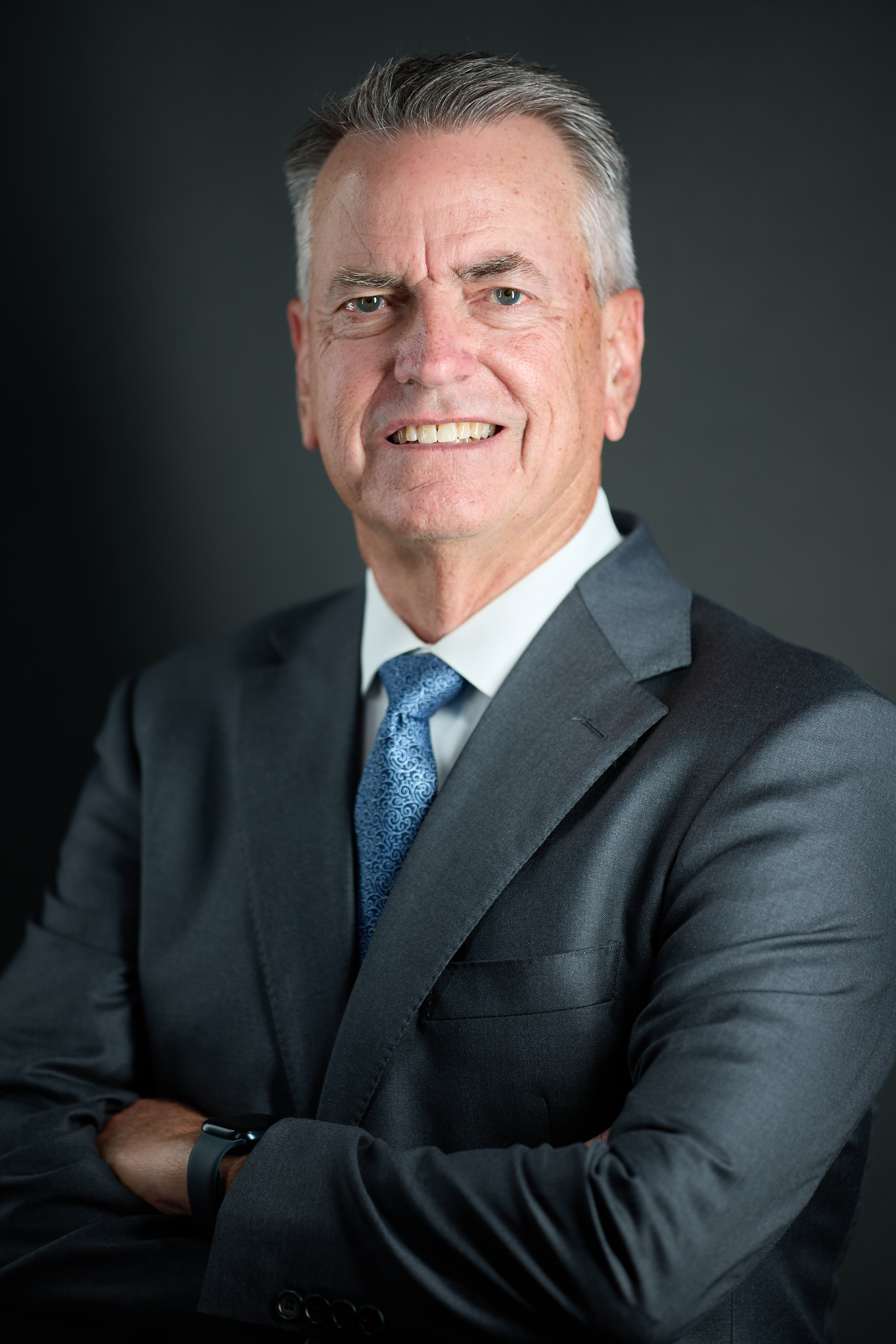
Tod Kimmelshue, chair of the Butte County Board of Supervisors, in April 2025

The citizens of the county of Butte are represented by the five member Butte County Board of Supervisors.

=== Tribal ===
The Berry Creek Rancheria of Tyme Maidu Indians of California is headquartered in Oroville. The Berry Creek Rancheria operates Gold Country Casino.

The Mooretown Rancheria of Maidu Indians of California is also headquartered in Oroville. The Mooretown Rancheria operates Feather Falls Casino.

The governmental headquarters of the Mechoopda Indian Tribe of Chico Rancheria is located in Chico.

=== State ===
Butte County is in the 3rd Assembly district, represented by Vacant. The county is in the 1st senatorial district, represented by Republican Megan Dahle.

According to the California Secretary of State, as of February 10, 2019, Butte County has 172,054 registered voters. Of those, 42,093 (34.4%) are registered Democrats, 41,330 (33.8%) are registered Republicans and 30,377 (24.8%) have declined to state a political party.

On November 4, 2008, Butte County voted 56.7% for Proposition 8 which amended the California Constitution to ban same-sex marriages.

=== Federal ===
Butte County is in California's 1st congressional district, represented by Republican James Gallagher.

Butte is a bellwether county in presidential elections, and one of only thirteen to have voted for Barack Obama in 2008, Mitt Romney in 2012, Donald Trump in 2016, and Joe Biden in 2020. (Note: The other twelve are Teton County, Idaho; Kendall County, Illinois; Kent County, Maryland; McLean County, Illinois; Tippecanoe County, Indiana; Kent County, Michigan; Leelanau County, Michigan; Carroll County, New Hampshire; Rockingham County, New Hampshire; Marion County, Oregon; Grand County, Utah; and Albany County, Wyoming.)

United States presidential election results for Butte County, California (Note: This total comprised 3,365 votes for Progressive Theodore Roosevelt (who was official Republican nominee in California), 930 votes for Socialist Eugene V. Debs and 489 votes for Prohibition Party nominee Eugene W. Chafin.)
Year	Republican		Democratic		Third party(ies)	
Year	No.	%	No.	%	No.	%
1880	1,814	49.75%	1,832	50.25%	0	0.00%
1884	2,172	49.06%	2,118	47.84%	137	3.09%
1888	2,191	48.25%	2,215	48.78%	135	2.97%
1892	2,180	46.73%	2,141	45.89%	344	7.37%
1896	2,075	48.31%	2,120	49.36%	100	2.33%
1900	2,322	52.55%	2,011	45.51%	86	1.95%
1904	2,799	58.84%	1,574	33.09%	384	8.07%
1908	3,094	52.74%	2,146	36.58%	626	10.67%
1912	10	0.11%	4,028	45.66%	4,784	54.23%
1916	3,956	40.91%	4,888	50.55%	825	8.53%
1920	5,409	65.69%	2,262	27.47%	563	6.84%
1924	4,382	42.25%	1,299	12.52%	4,691	45.23%
1928	6,306	60.45%	3,946	37.83%	180	1.73%
1932	4,322	29.14%	9,645	65.03%	865	5.83%
1936	5,103	32.04%	10,490	65.86%	335	2.10%
1940	7,433	40.46%	10,684	58.15%	255	1.39%
1944	7,852	46.83%	8,811	52.55%	105	0.63%
1948	10,948	49.36%	10,133	45.68%	1,100	4.96%
1952	19,248	63.27%	10,913	35.87%	263	0.86%
1956	18,382	58.43%	12,933	41.11%	147	0.47%
1960	20,838	57.60%	15,163	41.92%	174	0.48%
1964	19,574	48.43%	20,831	51.54%	14	0.03%
1968	22,225	56.68%	12,887	32.87%	4,099	10.45%
1972	28,819	57.61%	18,401	36.78%	2,808	5.61%
1976	28,400	51.77%	24,203	44.12%	2,251	4.10%
1980	38,188	57.85%	19,520	29.57%	8,304	12.58%
1984	45,381	63.06%	25,421	35.32%	1,162	1.61%
1988	40,143	56.04%	30,406	42.45%	1,082	1.51%
1992	31,608	37.18%	32,489	38.22%	20,917	24.60%
1996	38,961	48.98%	30,651	38.53%	9,938	12.49%
2000	45,584	54.45%	31,338	37.43%	6,799	8.12%
2004	51,662	53.73%	42,448	44.14%	2,047	2.13%
2008	46,706	47.50%	49,013	49.85%	2,606	2.65%
2012	44,479	49.01%	42,669	47.02%	3,604	3.97%
2016	45,144	47.24%	41,567	43.50%	8,853	9.26%
2020	48,730	47.74%	50,426	49.41%	2,910	2.85%
2024	47,179	49.90%	44,228	46.77%	3,149	3.33%

== Education ==
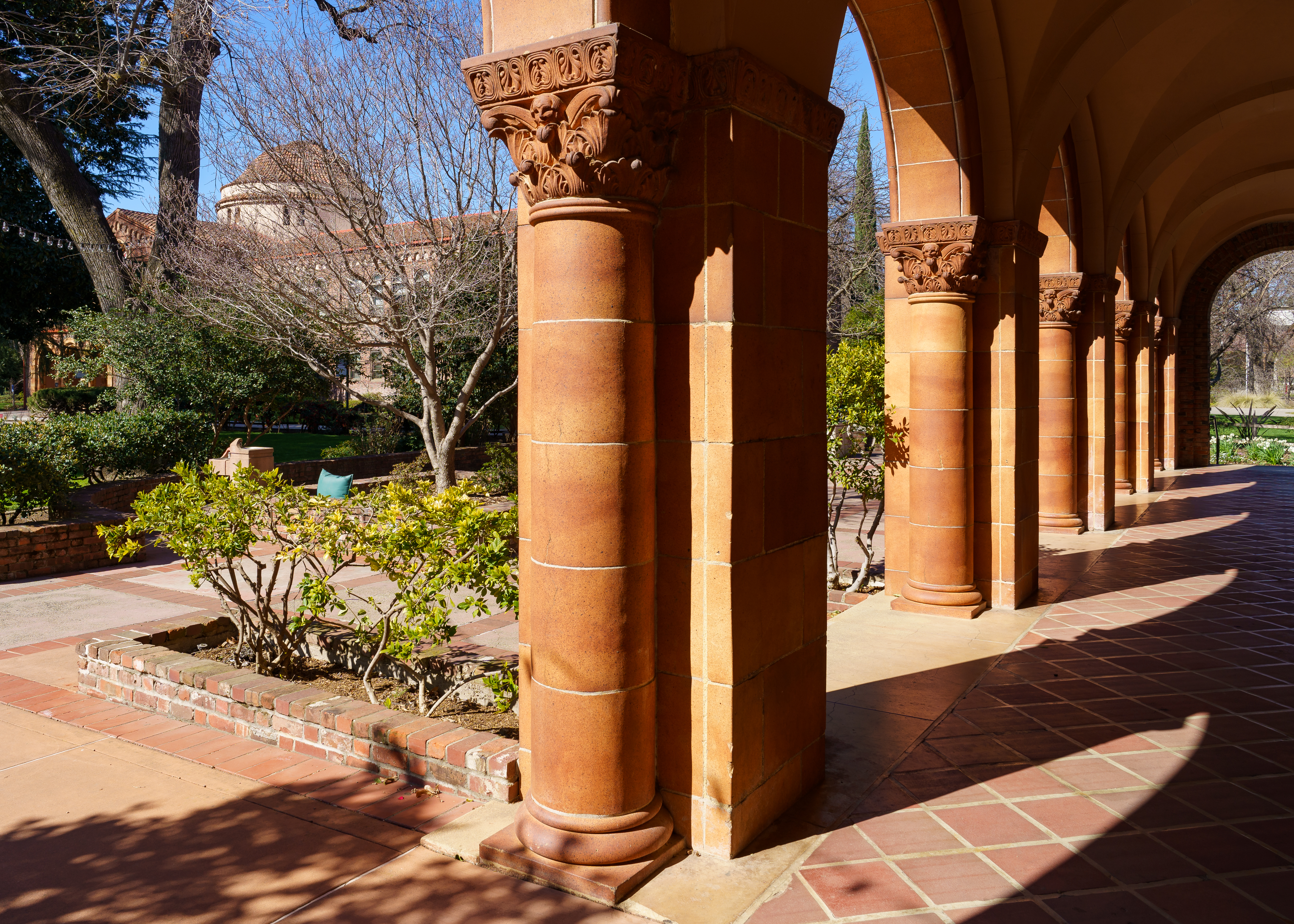
California State University, Chico was founded in 1887

=== Public schools ===
There are roughly 90 public schools in the county according to the National Center for Educational Statistics.

The following school districts cover portions of the county:

K-12:

- Biggs Unified School District
- Chico Unified School District
- Durham Unified School District
- Gridley Unified School District
- Marysville Joint Unified School District
- Paradise Unified School District

Secondary:

- Oroville Union High School District

Elementary:

- Bangor Union Elementary School District
- Feather Falls Union Elementary School District
- Golden Feather Union Elementary School District
- Manzanita Elementary School District
- Oroville City Elementary School District
- Palermo Union School District
- Pioneer Union Elementary School District
- Thermalito Union School District

=== Colleges and universities ===
- Butte College
- Butte–Glenn Community College District
- California State University, Chico

=== Public libraries ===
Butte County Library provides library services to residents of the County through six branches in Biggs, Chico, Durham, Gridley, Oroville and Paradise. The mission of the Butte County Library is to provide all individuals, regardless of age, ethnic background, educational or economic level, with free access to ideas, information, and technology.

For many years, the library served rural and mountain communities through regularly scheduled bookmobile visits; however, due to budget cuts, this service was discontinued in 2009 and the bookmobile was sold. The library serves low-literacy adults through several programs of the Butte County Library Literacy Services division, including the Adult Reading Program, Families for Literacy and the Literacy Coach, a 36-foot (11 m) vehicle that provides mobile programming like story times, parent meetings, workshops, and computer and teacher trainings.

The library operates as a department of the County of Butte, governed by the Butte County Board of Supervisors.

== Transportation ==
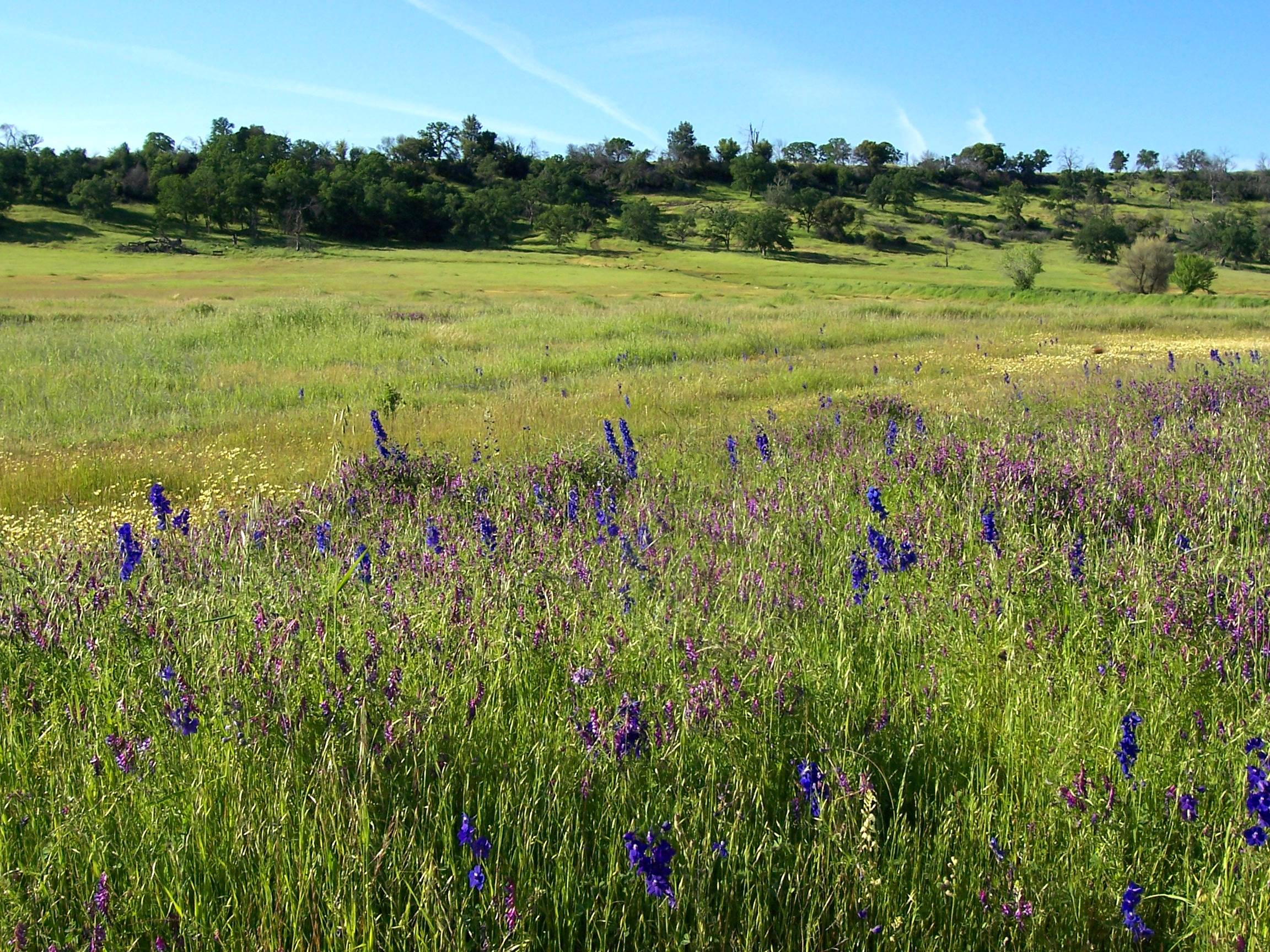
Butte County is home to Bidwell Park in Chico, one of the largest municipal parks in the United States

=== Major highways ===
- State Route 32
- State Route 70
- State Route 99
- State Route 149
- State Route 162
- State Route 191

=== Public transportation ===
Butte Regional Transit or the B-Line, provides service in and between Chico, Oroville, Paradise, Gridley and Biggs. Chico is also a connection point for Glenn Ride buses to Glenn County and Plumas Transit Systems buses to Plumas County.

Greyhound and FlixBus buses stop in Chico.

Amtrak's Coast Starlight (Los Angeles-Seattle) passenger train makes a stop daily in each direction in Chico's Chico station.

=== Airports ===
General Aviation airports in Butte County include:

- Chico Municipal Airport
- Oroville Municipal Airport
- Paradise Airport
- Ranchaero Airport
- Richvale Airport

== Communities ==
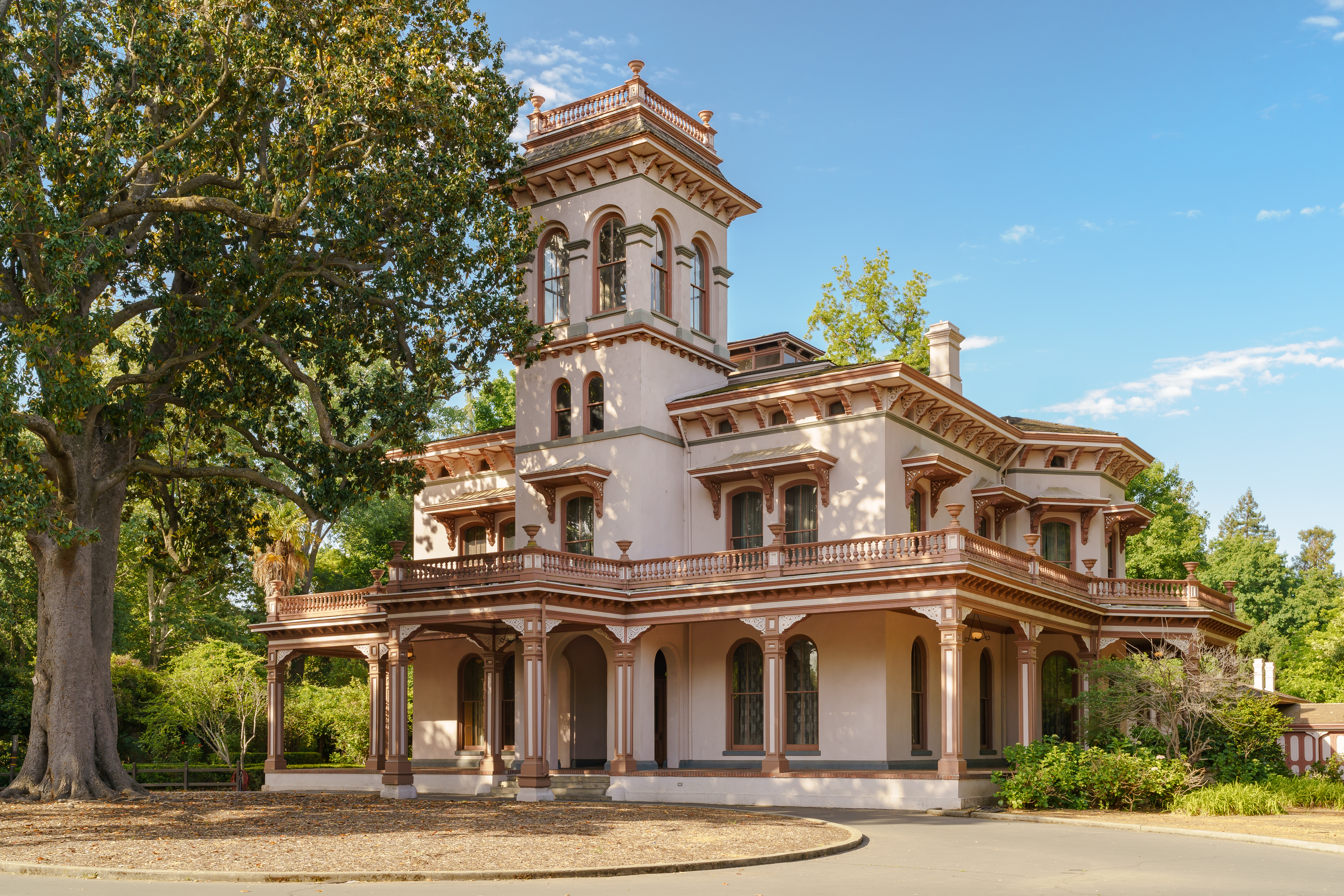
Bidwell Mansion in Chico

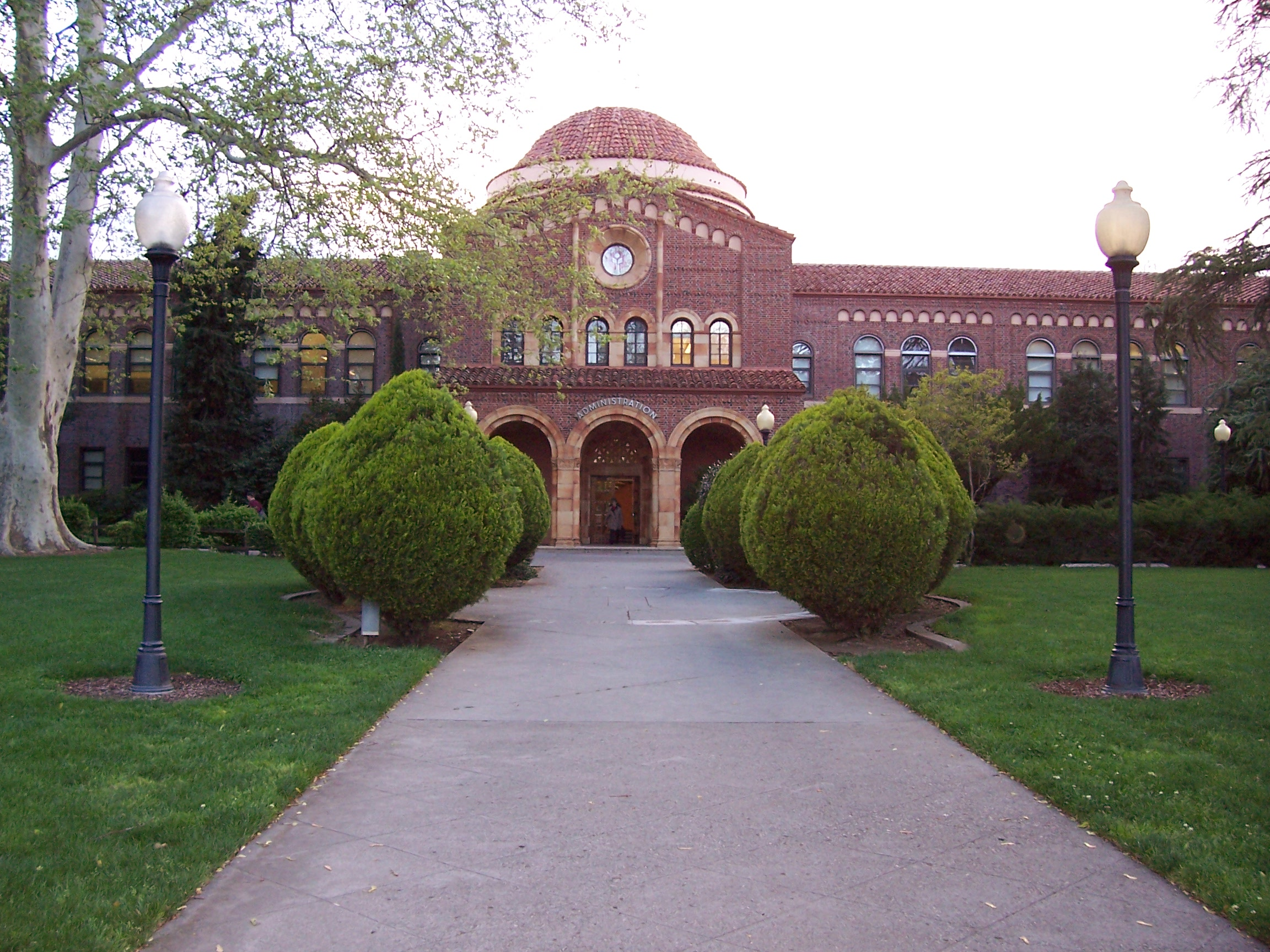
Kendall Hall, the administration building at California State University, Chico in Chico

=== Cities ===
- Biggs
- Chico
- Gridley
- Oroville (county seat)

=== Towns ===
- Paradise

=== Census-designated places ===
- Bangor
- Berry Creek
- Butte Creek Canyon
- Butte Meadows
- Butte Valley
- Cherokee
- Clipper Mills
- Cohasset
- Concow
- Durham
- Forbestown
- Forest Ranch
- Honcut
- Kelly Ridge
- Magalia
- Nord
- Oroville East
- Palermo
- Rackerby
- Richvale
- Robinson Mill
- South Oroville
- Stirling City
- Thermalito
- Yankee Hill

=== Unincorporated communities ===
- Centerville
- DeSabla
- Helltown
- Inskip
- Lomo
- Lovelock
- Powellton

=== Former townships ===
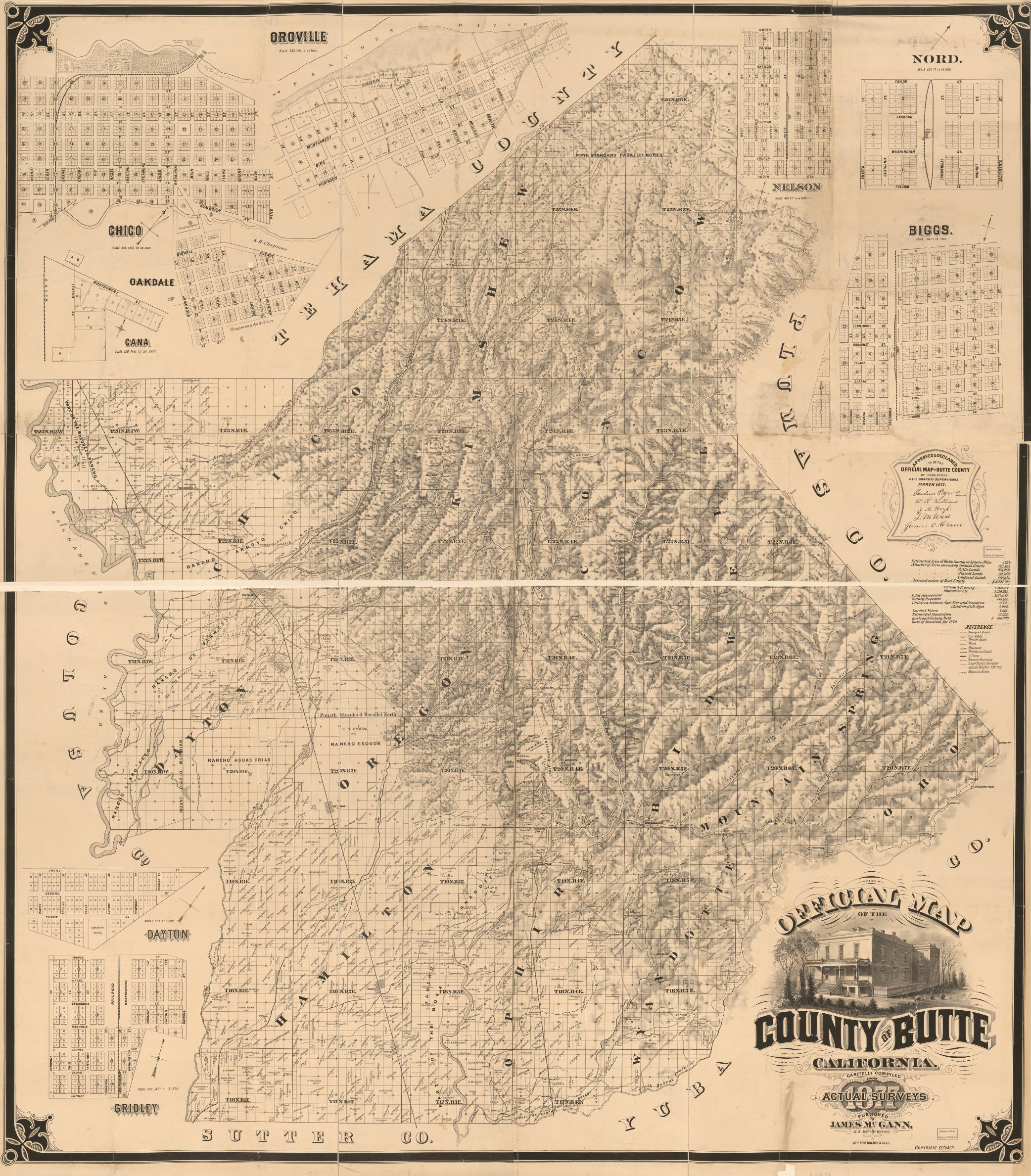
The 10 civil townships, 1877

In August 1851, the county was divided into six judicial (civil) townships, the four marked by asterisks below, plus Quartz and Mineral, which were separated from Butte County with the formation of Plumas County in 1854.

Between 1851 and 1861, there were several additions and other realignments of the township boundaries; from 1861, the townships were:

- Bidwell
- Chico
- Concow
- Hamilton*
- Kimshew
- Mountain Spring
- Ophir*
- Oregon*
- Oro*
- Wyandotte

Townships created and dissolved between 1851 and 1861 were Benton, Eureka, and Cascade.

=== Ghost towns ===
- Bidwell's Bar – now located under Lake Oroville
- Butte Creek
- Coutolenc
- Diamondville
- Forks of Butte – a former gold mining settlement
- Hamilton - Butte County's first permanent county seat, John Bidwell discovered gold at Hamilton in 1848, and the settlement arose. It was located on the west side of the Feather River, 15 mi (24 km) downstream from Oroville.
- Lynchburg

=== Population ranking ===
The population ranking of the following table is based on the 2020 census of Butte County.

† county seat

Rank	City/Town/etc.	Municipal type	Population (2020 Census)
1	Chico	City	101,475
2	† Oroville	City	20,042
3	Oroville East	CDP	8,038
4	Magalia	CDP	7,795
5	Gridley	City	7,421
6	Thermalito	CDP	7,198
7	Durham	CDP	5,834
8	Palermo	CDP	5,555
9	Paradise	Town	4,764
10	South Oroville	CDP	3,235
11	Kelly Ridge	CDP	3,006
12	Biggs	City	1,964
13	Berry Creek	CDP	1,637
14	Forest Ranch	CDP	1,304
15	Butte Valley	CDP	945
16	Cohasset	CDP	830
17	Butte Creek Canyon	CDP	780
18	Bangor	CDP	695
19	Concow	CDP	402
20	Forbestown	CDP	396
21	Honcut	CDP	306
22	Nord	CDP	286
23	Stirling City	CDP	284
24	Yankee Hill	CDP	260
25	Richvale	CDP	234
26	Rackerby	CDP	210
27	Clipper Mills	CDP	160
28	Berry Creek Rancheria	AIAN	136
29	Robinson Mill	CDP	89
30	Cherokee	CDP	88
31	Butte Meadows	CDP	74
32	Enterprise Rancheria	AIAN	4

== In popular culture ==
Several movies have been filmed in Butte County, including Gone with the Wind, The Outlaw Josey Wales, Friendly Persuasion, Magic Town, The Klansman, Ruby Ridge: An American Tragedy, The Adventures of Robin Hood, and Under Wraps. A 2013 episode of the television series Sons of Anarchy involves the sons coming into contact with corrupt police in the fictional town of Eden, located in Butte County.

== See also ==
- List of California counties
- List of school districts in Butte County, California
- List of museums in the Shasta Cascade (California)
- National Register of Historic Places listings in Butte County, California

== Notes ==
Notes
