= Powellton, California =

Powellton
- Unincorporated community
- Location in California Powellton (the United States)
- Coordinates: 39°55′44″N 121°34′21″W
- Country: United States
- State: California
- County: Butte
- Elevation: 3,622 ft (1,104 m)

Powellton was an unincorporated community in Butte County, California, United States. It lies at an elevation of 3,622 feet (1,104 m). The place is named for R.P. Powell, who arrived in 1853. Originally Powell's Ranch, it was renamed when a post office was established in 1872; the office closed in 1906. It was a center of lumber production in its heyday, but nothing remains at the site.
