= Thermalito, California =

Thermalito
- Census designated place
- Location in Butte County and the state of California

- Location in the United States
- Coordinates: 39°30′41″N 121°35′13″W
- Country: USA
- State: California
- County: Butte

Government
  - State senator: Megan Dahle (R)
  - Assemblymember: Vacant
  - U. S. rep.: James Gallagher (R)

Area
  - Total: 12.895 sq mi (33.399 km^{2})
  - Land: 12.728 sq mi (32.965 km^{2})
  - Water: 0.168 sq mi (0.434 km^{2}) 1.30%
- Elevation: 223 ft (68 m)

Population (2020)
  - Total: 7,198
  - Density: 565.5/sq mi (218.4/km^{2})
- Time zone: UTC-8 (Pacific)
  - Summer (DST): UTC-7 (PDT)
- ZIP Code: 95965
- Area code: 530, 837
- FIPS code: 06-78470
- GNIS feature ID: 1659991

Thermalito (Spanish for "Small Thermal") is a census-designated place (CDP) in Butte County, California, United States. The population was 7,198 at the 2020 census, up from 6,646 at the 2010 census. The area is generally considered an integral part of Oroville, and borders the town on two sides, in addition to the near-enclave of the city of Oroville surrounded by Thermalito on all sides, with the exception of the extremely narrow spit of land connecting Afterbay to Oroville proper.

== Geography ==
According to the United States Census Bureau, the CDP has a total area of 12.9 square miles (33 km^{2}), of which 12.7 square miles (33 km^{2}) is land and 0.17 square miles (0.44 km^{2}) (1.30%) is water.

=== Climate ===
According to the Köppen climate classification system, Thermalito has a warm-summer Mediterranean climate, abbreviated "Csa" on climate maps.

=== Thermalito Trail ===
The Thermalito Trail is a trail located in Thermalito. It passes through the Kilkare Canyon.

== History ==
A post office operated in Thermalito from 1895 to 1920.

== Demographics ==
Historical population
Census	Pop.	Note	%±
1970	4,217		—
1980	4,961		17.6%
1990	5,646		13.8%
2000	6,045		7.1%
2010	6,646		9.9%
2020	7,198		8.3%
U.S. Decennial Census; 1860–1870 1880-1890; 1900 1910 1920; 1930 1940 1950; 1960 1970 1980; 1990 2000 2010

Thermolito first appeared as an unincorporated community in the 1970 U.S. census; and as a census-designated place in the 1980 United States census.

=== Racial and ethnic composition ===
Thermalito CDP, California – Racial and ethnic composition Note: the US Census treats Hispanic/Latino as an ethnic category. This table excludes Latinos from the racial categories and assigns them to a separate category. Hispanics/Latinos may be of any race.
Race / Ethnicity (NH = Non-Hispanic)	Pop 2000	Pop 2010	Pop 2020	% 2000	% 2010	% 2020
White alone (NH)	4,467	4,280	4,195	73.90%	64.40%	58.28%
Black or African American alone (NH)	25	57	72	0.41%	0.86%	1.00%
Native American or Alaska Native alone (NH)	165	220	202	2.73%	3.31%	2.81%
Asian alone (NH)	635	1,098	1,429	10.50%	16.52%	19.85%
Native Hawaiian or Pacific Islander alone (NH)	11	30	17	0.18%	0.45%	0.24%
Other race alone (NH)	4	5	32	0.07%	0.08%	0.44%
Mixed race or Multiracial (NH)	273	243	447	4.52%	3.66%	6.21%
Hispanic or Latino (any race)	465	713	804	7.69%	10.73%	11.17%
Total	6,045	6,646	7,198	100.00%	100.00%	100.00%

=== 2020 census ===
As of the 2020 census, Thermalito had a population of 7,198 and a population density of 565.5 inhabitants per square mile (218.3/km^{2}). The age distribution was 23.1% under the age of 18, 8.2% aged 18 to 24, 25.9% aged 25 to 44, 25.3% aged 45 to 64, and 17.4% who were 65 years of age or older. The median age was 38.5 years. For every 100 females, there were 101.5 males, and for every 100 females age 18 and over, there were 100.1 males.

The census reported that 99.5% of the population lived in households, 0.5% lived in non-institutionalized group quarters, and no one was institutionalized. 88.5% of residents lived in urban areas, while 11.5% lived in rural areas.

There were 2,430 households, out of which 31.6% included children under the age of 18. Of all households, 40.9% were married-couple households, 11.3% were cohabiting couple households, 26.5% had a female householder with no spouse or partner present, and 21.2% had a male householder with no spouse or partner present. 23.4% of households were one person, and 12.1% had someone living alone who was 65 or older. The average household size was 2.95. There were 1,629 families (67.0% of all households).

There were 2,573 housing units at an average density of 202.2 units per square mile (78.1 units/km^{2}), of which 2,430 (94.4%) were occupied. Of these, 68.5% were owner-occupied, and 31.5% were occupied by renters. The homeowner vacancy rate was 1.2% and the rental vacancy rate was 4.4%.

=== Income and poverty ===
In 2023, the US Census Bureau estimated that the median household income was $53,814, and the per capita income was $30,480. About 8.9% of families and 17.2% of the population were below the poverty line.

=== 2010 ===
At the 2010 census Thermalito had a population of 6,646. The population density was 516.4 inhabitants per square mile (199.4/km^{2}). The racial makeup of Thermalito was 4,594 (69.1%) White, 61 (0.9%) African American, 257 (3.9%) Native American, 1,102 (16.6%) Asian, 37 (0.6%) Pacific Islander, 270 (4.1%) from other races, and 325 (4.9%) from two or more races. Hispanic or Latino of any race were 713 people (10.7%).

The census reported that 6,556 people (98.6% of the population) lived in households, 52 (0.8%) lived in non-institutionalized group quarters, and 38 (0.6%) were institutionalized.

There were 2,263 households, 794 (35.1%) had children under the age of 18 living in them, 1,038 (45.9%) were opposite-sex married couples living together, 332 (14.7%) had a female householder with no husband present, 190 (8.4%) had a male householder with no wife present. There were 190 (8.4%) unmarried opposite-sex partnerships, and 12 (0.5%) same-sex married couples or partnerships. 550 households (24.3%) were one person and 246 (10.9%) had someone living alone who was 65 or older. The average household size was 2.90. There were 1,560 families (68.9% of households); the average family size was 3.44.

The age distribution was 1,748 people (26.3%) under the age of 18, 691 people (10.4%) aged 18 to 24, 1,458 people (21.9%) aged 25 to 44, 1,754 people (26.4%) aged 45 to 64, and 995 people (15.0%) who were 65 or older. The median age was 37.0 years. For every 100 females, there were 100.4 males. For every 100 females age 18 and over, there were 98.9 males.

There were 2,447 housing units at an average density of 190.1 per square mile (73.4/km^{2}), of which 2,263 were occupied, 1,522 (67.3%) by the owners and 741 (32.7%) by renters. The homeowner vacancy rate was 3.2%; the rental vacancy rate was 5.7%. 4,227 people (63.6% of the population) lived in owner-occupied housing units and 2,329 people (35.0%) lived in rental housing units.

== Education ==
Most of Thermalito is within the Thermalito Union School District and the Oroville Union High School District, while a piece extends into the Biggs Unified School District.

Most high school students in Thermalito attend Oroville High School.

== See also ==
- Oroville–Thermalito Complex
