= Nord, California =

Nord
- census-designated place
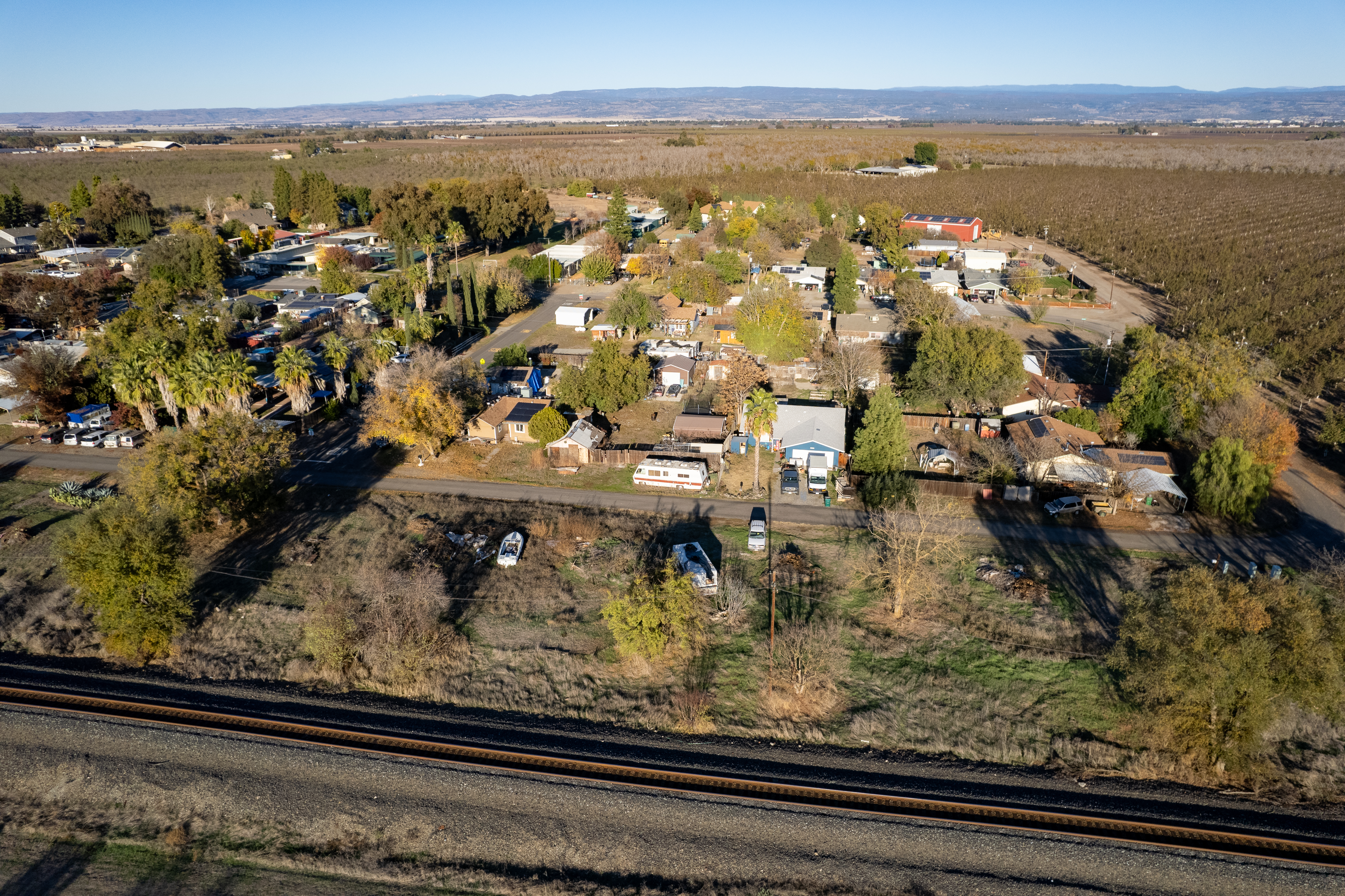
- Aerial view of Nord, November 2023

- Location in California
- Coordinates: 39°46′47″N 121°57′26″W
- Country: United States
- State: California
- County: Butte

Area
  - Total: 2.105 sq mi (5.453 km^{2})
  - Land: 2.105 sq mi (5.453 km^{2})
  - Water: 0 sq mi (0 km^{2})
- Elevation: 151 ft (46 m)

Population (2020)
  - Total: 286
  - Density: 136/sq mi (52.4/km^{2})
- Time zone: UTC-8 (Pacific (PST))
  - Summer (DST): UTC-7 (PDT)
- ZIP Code: 95973
- Area codes: 530, 837
- GNIS feature ID: 1659766; 2612484

Nord is a census-designated place in Butte County, California, United States. Its zip code is 95973 and its area code is 530. It lies at an elevation of 151 feet (46 m). Nord's population was 286 at the 2020 census.

== History ==
Nord was platted in 1871 by G. W. Colby following the completion of the Oregon and California Railroad to that point (some sources say the town was laid out in 1870). In 1882, Nord had a hotel, saloon, blacksmith, wagon shop, livery stable, and Good Templars lodge, and was said to ship more grain by rail than any other point in Butte County. Nord had a store until recently, but no longer has any businesses.

A post office operated at Nord from 1871 to 1933, with an interruption during 1919 and 1920.

== Demographics ==
Historical population
Census	Pop.	Note	%±
2010	320		—
2020	286		−10.6%
U.S. Decennial Census; 2010

Nord first appeared as a census designated place in the 2010 U.S. census.

The 2020 United States census reported that Nord had a population of 286. The population density was 135.9 inhabitants per square mile (52.5/km^{2}). The racial makeup of Nord was 174 (60.8%) White, 1 (0.3%) African American, 4 (1.4%) Native American, 12 (4.2%) Asian, 0 (0.0%) Pacific Islander, 37 (12.9%) from other races, and 58 (20.3%) from two or more races. Hispanic or Latino of any race were 104 persons (36.4%).

The whole population lived in households. There were 93 households, out of which 26 (28.0%) had children under the age of 18 living in them, 62 (66.7%) were married-couple households, 5 (5.4%) were cohabiting couple households, 10 (10.8%) had a female householder with no partner present, and 16 (17.2%) had a male householder with no partner present. 13 households (14.0%) were one person, and 6 (6.5%) were one person aged 65 or older. The average household size was 3.08. There were 78 families (83.9% of all households).

The age distribution was 57 people (19.9%) under the age of 18, 26 people (9.1%) aged 18 to 24, 56 people (19.6%) aged 25 to 44, 86 people (30.1%) aged 45 to 64, and 61 people (21.3%) who were 65 years of age or older. The median age was 47.2 years. For every 100 females, there were 120.0 males.

There were 110 housing units at an average density of 52.3 units per square mile (20.2 units/km^{2}), of which 93 (84.5%) were occupied. Of these, 62 (66.7%) were owner-occupied, and 31 (33.3%) were occupied by renters.

== Government ==
=== State ===
The citizens of Nord, as constituents of California's 3rd Assembly District, are represented by Vacant in the California State Assembly, and as members of California's 1st Senate District, are represented by Republican Megan Dahle in the California State Senate.

=== Federal ===
Nord is in California's 1st congressional district, represented by Republican James Gallagher.

== Education ==
Students in Nord are served by the Chico Unified School District.
