= Honcut, California =

Honcut
- census-designated place
- Location of Honcut in Butte County, California.

- Location in California
- Coordinates: 39°19′45″N 121°32′02″W
- Country: United States
- State: California
- County: Butte

Area
  - Total: 4.236 sq mi (10.971 km^{2})
  - Land: 4.236 sq mi (10.971 km^{2})
  - Water: 0 sq mi (0 km^{2}) 0%
- Elevation: 108 ft (33 m)

Population (2020)
  - Total: 306
  - Density: 72.2/sq mi (27.9/km^{2})
- Time zone: UTC-8 (Pacific (PST))
  - Summer (DST): UTC-7 (PDT)
- ZIP Code: 95965
- Area code: 530
- GNIS feature IDs: 225509; 2612482

Honcut (formerly, Moores Station) is a census-designated place in Butte County, California, United States. It lies at an elevation of 108 feet (33 m). Lower Honcut Road links the community to California State Route 70. Honcut is near the Yuba County line.

Honcut was a stop on the California and Northern Railroad (later Southern Pacific) from the railroad's construction in the 1860s. In 1883, a sawmill was built in Honcut at the terminus of a V-flume from nearby Woodleaf, making Honcut "a bustling, active town."

Honcut's post office was established in 1856 and moved back and forth several times between Butte and Yuba Counties, before being closed for good in 1943. Moores Station (named for John C. Moore, first postmaster) post office was opened in 1869, closed in 1875, reopened in 1876, and closed for good in 1892.

Honcut's population was 306 at the 2020 census.

== Demographics ==
Historical population
Census	Pop.	Note	%±
2010	370		—
2020	306		−17.3%
U.S. Decennial Census; 2010

Honcut first appeared as a census designated place in the 2010 U.S. census.

The 2020 United States census reported that Honcut had a population of 306. The population density was 72.2 inhabitants per square mile (27.9/km^{2}). The racial makeup of Honcut was 159 (52.0%) White, 0 (0.0%) African American, 8 (2.6%) Native American, 11 (3.6%) Asian, 3 (1.0%) Pacific Islander, 75 (24.5%) from other races, and 50 (16.3%) from two or more races. Hispanic or Latino of any race were 143 persons (46.7%).

The whole population lived in households. There were 99 households, out of which 35 (35.4%) had children under the age of 18 living in them, 55 (55.6%) were married-couple households, 7 (7.1%) were cohabiting couple households, 21 (21.2%) had a female householder with no partner present, and 16 (16.2%) had a male householder with no partner present. 17 households (17.2%) were one person, and 6 (6.1%) were one person aged 65 or older. The average household size was 3.09. There were 74 families (74.7% of all households).

The age distribution was 65 people (21.2%) under the age of 18, 39 people (12.7%) aged 18 to 24, 47 people (15.4%) aged 25 to 44, 92 people (30.1%) aged 45 to 64, and 63 people (20.6%) who were 65 years of age or older. The median age was 45.3 years. For every 100 females, there were 121.7 males.

There were 119 housing units at an average density of 28.1 units per square mile (10.8 units/km^{2}), of which 99 (83.2%) were occupied. Of these, 67 (67.7%) were owner-occupied, and 32 (32.3%) were occupied by renters.

== Education ==
Honcut students are served by the Palermo Union Elementary School District and the Oroville Union High School District.
