= Lynchburg, California =

Extinct community in California, U.S.

Coordinates: 39.5010°N 121.5470°W

Lynchburg is a former settlement in Butte County, California, United States. It was located 1 mile (1.6 km) southeast of Oroville. Lynchburg was founded in 1848 by and named for George H. Lynch, a local storeowner. Wooden buildings were erected in the area and the population grew. Lynchburg emerged as a competitor of Ophir City, and by 1855 had outgrown its rival settlement. Once a lively place, Lynchburg began to wither by the mid-1850s.
