= Butte Valley, California =

- Unincorporated community
- Location of Butte Valley in Butte County, California.

- Position in California.
- Coordinates: 39°39′26″N 121°38′11″W
- Country: United States
- State: California
- County: Butte

Area
  - Total: 18.300 sq mi (47.398 km^{2})
  - Land: 18.289 sq mi (47.368 km^{2})
  - Water: 0.011 sq mi (0.029 km^{2}) 0.06%
- Elevation: 351 ft (107 m)

Population (2020)
  - Total: 945
  - Density: 51.7/sq mi (20.0/km^{2})
- Time zone: UTC-8 (Pacific (PST))
  - Summer (DST): UTC-7 (PDT)
- GNIS feature ID: 2612475

Butte Valley is an unincorporated community and census-designated place (CDP) named for a former settlement in Butte County, California, United States. It is located within the county seat of Oroville and uses Oroville addresses in addition to being 5.5 miles (8.9 km) southeast of Chico. A post office operated at Butte Valley from 1861 to 1871, when it was re-located to Durham. Butte Valley sits at an elevation of 351 feet (107 m). The 2020 United States census reported Butte Valley's population is 945. Sources of Oroville's Butte Valley history are currently not accessible to the public through online search.

== Demographics ==
Historical population
Census	Pop.	Note	%±
2010	899		—
2020	945		5.1%
U.S. Decennial Census; 2010

=== 2020 census ===
As of the 2020 census, Butte Valley had a population of 945. The population density was 51.7 inhabitants per square mile (20.0/km^{2}). The median age was 48.7 years. 20.0% of residents were under the age of 18, 6.9% were aged 18 to 24, 19.6% were aged 25 to 44, 30.6% were aged 45 to 64, and 23.0% were 65 years of age or older. For every 100 females there were 91.7 males, and for every 100 females age 18 and over there were 81.3 males age 18 and over.

0.0% of residents lived in urban areas, while 100.0% lived in rural areas.

There were 341 households in Butte Valley, of which 25.2% had children under the age of 18 living in them. Of all households, 60.1% were married-couple households, 6.7% were cohabiting couple households, 11.1% were households with a male householder and no spouse or partner present, and 22.0% were households with a female householder and no spouse or partner present. About 22.0% of all households were made up of individuals and 12.3% had someone living alone who was 65 years of age or older. The average household size was 2.77. There were 242 families (71.0% of all households).

There were 381 housing units at an average density of 20.8 units per square mile (8.0 units/km^{2}), of which 10.5% were vacant. Of occupied housing units, 89.4% were owner-occupied, and 10.6% were occupied by renters. The homeowner vacancy rate was 1.3% and the rental vacancy rate was 7.7%.

Racial composition as of the 2020 census
Race	Number	Percent
White	745	78.8%
Black or African American	0	0.0%
American Indian and Alaska Native	20	2.1%
Asian	6	0.6%
Native Hawaiian and Other Pacific Islander	1	0.1%
Some other race	78	8.3%
Two or more races	95	10.1%
Hispanic or Latino (of any race)	153	16.2%

=== 2010 census ===
Butte Valley first appeared as a census designated place in the 2010 U.S. census.

== Education ==
The vast majority of students attend schools in the Durham Unified School District, while some attend in the Golden Feather Union Elementary School District and the Oroville Union High School District.
