= Hamilton, California =

Ghost town in California, United States

Coordinates: 39.4545°N 121.6398°W

Hamilton is a former settlement in Butte County, California, United States, and was its first permanent county seat. It was located on the west side of the Feather River, 15 miles (24 km) downstream from Oroville.

== History ==
John Bidwell discovered gold at Hamilton in 1848, and the settlement arose. The place was named Hamilton in honor of the nephew of Alexander Hamilton who laid out the town. Hamilton became the county seat in 1850, after Chico had been the county seat, for approximately six weeks in 1850, based on a provision in the 1850 statute creating counties that Butte's seat would be Butte City or Chico, whichever was chosen by the voters at the first election for county judges. As of Jan 1866 Hamilton had a school somewhere in the area of 47 children according to the union paper.

== Features ==
The former mining town of Hamilton – not to be confused with Hamilton City, a small town in Glenn County established in the late 19th century – once contained two taverns, one store, and one blacksmith shop. Soon after, another tavern was erected, also a new store, causing the first tavern to give up business. The clerk’s office was fixed in the bedroom of Tom Gray’s hotel until a shake shanty could be built. Most of the other officers held their offices in their bedrooms of the hotel where they were boarding. "The court itself was held in an old house owned by 'Mother Nichols', a widow who lived in a corner of it," wrote Chalmers.

A property tax of one-quarter cent was levied to pay for a courthouse and jail, and after much back-room dealing and bribery, a $9,200 jail was erected. "Considering the short period of its utility," commented Chalmers, "the cost was hardly compensated for. It was a first-class jail, however, for that time. The walls were of great solidity and thickness and so protected with sheet-iron that a prisoner once incarcerated within one of its two gloomy cells left hope of escape behind until liberated by due process of law." As for the courthouse, a house sitting about four miles downstream was bought and moved up to Hamilton. As soon as Butte had its courthouse and jail, however, the citizens of Bidwell's Bar (near Oroville, California) got the legislature to declare that their town, and not Hamilton, was the county seat, on the condition that the citizens of Bidwell's Bar build a new courthouse and jail, which they did, and the county seat was moved upstream on August 10, 1853. The "old" courthouse in Hamilton was demolished for its stone, while the jail was put to use as a granary until it burned down in 1878. Additionally, a post office was established in 1851 and closed in 1865.

== Current status ==
All that is visible from this old town is an overgrown cemetery and the pillars of an old bridge.
