= Bangor, California =

Bangor
- Census-designated place
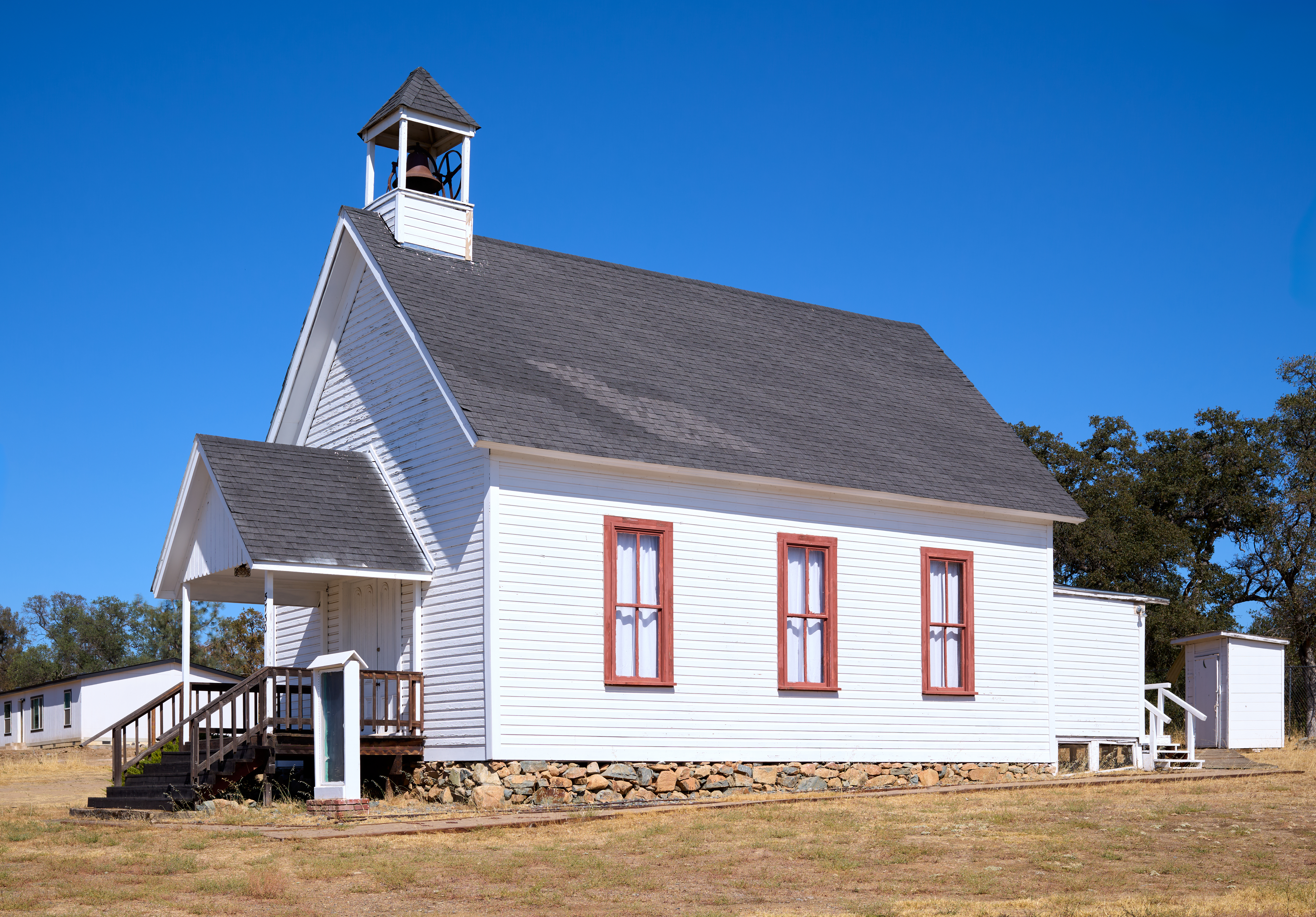
- The historic Bangor Church in 2025

- Location of Bangor in Butte County, California

- Location in California
- Coordinates: 39°23′19″N 121°24′19″W
- Country: United States
- State: California
- County: Butte

Area
  - Total: 13.42 sq mi (34.77 km^{2})
  - Land: 13.42 sq mi (34.77 km^{2})
  - Water: 0 sq mi (0.00 km^{2}) 0%
- Elevation: 761 ft (232 m)

Population (2020)
  - Total: 695
  - Density: 51.8/sq mi (19.99/km^{2})
- Time zone: UTC-8 (Pacific (PST))
  - Summer (DST): UTC-7 (PDT)
- ZIP code: 95914
- Area code: 530, 837
- GNIS feature IDs: 218644, 2612459

Bangor is a census-designated place in Butte County, California, United States, approximately 1.5 miles (2.4 km) from the Yuba County line. The U.S. Geological Survey (USGS) feature ID for the community is 218644, and for the census place is 2612459; and the elevation is given as 761 feet (232 m) above mean sea level (AMSL). The community is in a shallow valley with surrounding hills in the 800–950 foot range. The population was 695 at the 2020 census.

Bangor was founded as a mining boom-town in 1855 and named by the Lumbert Brothers, early settlers and storekeepers, for their home-town of Bangor, Maine. The first post office was established in 1857.

Latitude and longitude for the community are given as 39°23′19″N 121°24′19″W and the community is located at a crossroads. Oroville-Bangor Highway becomes Los Verjeles Road south of town, these roads running roughly north–south. LaPorte Road runs somewhat east–west through the community. There are two restaurants listed in the telephone directory. Bangor is served by area code 530 and has a ZIP Code of 95914. Driving east on LaPorte Road into the mountains eventually leads to Camp Eighteen.

== Demographics ==
Historical population
Census	Pop.	Note	%±
2010	646		—
2020	695		7.6%
U.S. Decennial Census; 2010

=== 2020 census ===
As of the 2020 census, Bangor had a population of 695. The population density was 51.8 inhabitants per square mile (20.0/km^{2}). 0.0% of residents lived in urban areas, while 100.0% lived in rural areas. 97.7% of the population lived in households, 2.3% lived in non-institutionalized group quarters, and no one was institutionalized.

The age distribution was 22.2% under the age of 18, 6.2% aged 18 to 24, 21.2% aged 25 to 44, 30.5% aged 45 to 64, and 20.0% who were 65 years of age or older. The median age was 45.5 years. For every 100 females there were 103.2 males, and for every 100 females age 18 and over there were 109.7 males age 18 and over.

There were 225 households in Bangor, of which 23.6% had children under the age of 18 living in them. Of all households, 48.4% were married-couple households, 8.4% were cohabiting couple households, 21.8% were households with a male householder and no spouse or partner present, and 21.3% were households with a female householder and no spouse or partner present. About 22.7% of all households were made up of individuals and 11.6% had someone living alone who was 65 years of age or older. The average household size was 3.02. There were 155 families (68.9% of all households).

There were 296 housing units at an average density of 22.1 units per square mile (8.5 units/km^{2}), of which 225 (76.0%) were occupied and 24.0% were vacant. Of the occupied units, 88.0% were owner-occupied and 12.0% were occupied by renters. The homeowner vacancy rate was 0.5% and the rental vacancy rate was 33.3%.

Racial composition as of the 2020 census
Race	Number	Percent
White	539	77.6%
Black or African American	8	1.2%
American Indian and Alaska Native	11	1.6%
Asian	29	4.2%
Native Hawaiian and Other Pacific Islander	1	0.1%
Some other race	25	3.6%
Two or more races	82	11.8%
Hispanic or Latino (of any race)	82	11.8%

=== 2010 census ===
Bangor first appeared as a census designated place in the 2010 U.S. census.

== Education ==
Bangor is served by the Bangor Union Elementary School District and the Oroville Union High School District.

== Attractions ==
Bangor has a growing wine industry. This is due to the area's soils, climate, and location. Bangor is located in the center of the North Sierra Wine Trail, which encompasses the East Foothills of Lake Oroville, through Bangor, and on to the micro appellation of North Yuba. The Trail is at the extreme northern tip of the Sierra Foothill Appellation. In 2010 the Mennonite-owned Bangor Bake Shoppe opened, specializing in home style baking, jams, quilts, and more.

== Bangor Firehouse Ghost ==
Butte County Fire Station 55 in Bangor has been said to be haunted by a "firehouse ghost". According to firefighters, it would pin them down in their beds, pull the ignition cords from the fire engine, and perform other mischievous acts. The station was demolished and replaced in 2010.
