= Oroville Union High School District =

School district in California, United States

Location
- 2211 Washington Ave. Oroville, California 95966 United States

District information
- Grades: 9–12
- Superintendent: Dr. Corey Willenberg
- Schools: 5
- NCES District ID: 0629130

Students and staff
- Students: 2,736
- Teachers: 119.50
- Student–teacher ratio: 22.90

Other information
- Website: www.ouhsd.org

Oroville Union High School District is a public school district in Butte County, California, United States. Schools in the district include Oroville High School, Prospect High School, Las Plumas High School, the Oroville Adult Education Career and Technical Center, and a Community Day School located at Oroville High School.

== Boundary ==
The district includes the municipality of Oroville, the following census-designated places: Bangor, Berry Creek, Cherokee, Concow, Honcut, Kelly Ridge, Oroville East, Palermo, Rackerby, Robinson Mill, South Oroville, and Yankee Hill. It also has most of Thermalito and parts of Butte Valley.
