= Robinson Mill, California =

Robinson Mill
- census-designated place
- Location in California
- Coordinates: 39°29′42″N 121°19′15″W
- Country: United States
- State: California
- County: Butte

Area
  - Total: 1.317 sq mi (3.411 km^{2})
  - Land: 1.317 sq mi (3.411 km^{2})
  - Water: 0 sq mi (0 km^{2}) 0%
- Elevation: 2,654 ft (809 m)

Population (2020)
  - Total: 89
  - Density: 68/sq mi (26/km^{2})
- Time zone: UTC-8 (Pacific (PST))
  - Summer (DST): UTC-7 (PDT)
- GNIS feature ID: 265465; 2612487

Robinson Mill (also, Robinson Mills, Robinson Ranch, Robinson Sawmill, Robinsons Mill, and Robinsons Rancho) is a census-designated place in Butte County, California, United States. It lies at an elevation of 2654 feet (809 m). Robinson Mill's population was 89 at the 2020 census.

== Demographics ==
Historical population
Census	Pop.	Note	%±
2010	80		—
2020	89		11.3%
U.S. Decennial Census; 2010

Robinson Mill first appeared as a census designated place in the 2010 U.S. census.

The 2020 United States census reported that Robinson Mill had a population of 89. The population density was 67.6 inhabitants per square mile (26.1/km^{2}). The racial makeup of Robinson Mill was 71 (80%) White, 1 (1%) African American, 2 (2%) Native American, 8 (9%) Asian, 0 (0%) Pacific Islander, 3 (3%) from other races, and 4 (4%) from two or more races. Hispanic or Latino of any race were 13 persons (15%).

The whole population lived in households. There were 39 households, out of which 6 (15%) had children under the age of 18 living in them, 21 (54%) were married-couple households, 5 (13%) were cohabiting couple households, 6 (15%) had a female householder with no partner present, and 7 (18%) had a male householder with no partner present. 9 households (23%) were one person, and 6 (15%) were one person aged 65 or older. The average household size was 2.28. There were 25 families (64% of all households).

The age distribution was 5 people (6%) under the age of 18, 9 people (10%) aged 18 to 24, 28 people (32%) aged 25 to 44, 18 people (20%) aged 45 to 64, and 29 people (33%) who were 65 years of age or older. The median age was 52.5 years. There were 44 males and 45 females.

There were 47 housing units at an average density of 35.7 units per square mile (13.8 units/km^{2}), of which 39 (83%) were occupied. Of these, 21 (54%) were owner-occupied, and 18 (46%) were occupied by renters.

== Education ==
The CDP is served by the Oroville City Elementary School District and the Oroville Union High School District.
