= Clipper Mills, California =

Clipper Mills
- census-designated place
- Location of Clipper Mills in Butte County, California.

- Location in California
- Coordinates: 39°31′58″N 121°09′27″W
- Country: United States
- State: California
- County: Butte

Area
  - Total: 1.74 sq mi (4.50 km^{2})
  - Land: 1.74 sq mi (4.50 km^{2})
  - Water: 0 sq mi (0.00 km^{2}) 0%
- Elevation: 3,550 ft (1,082 m)

Population (2020)
  - Total: 160
  - Density: 92.0/sq mi (35.53/km^{2})
- Time zone: UTC-8 (Pacific (PST))
  - Summer (DST): UTC-7 (PDT)
- ZIP Code: 95930
- Area code: 530
- GNIS feature IDs: 1655908; 2612476

Clipper Mills (also, Clipper Mill) is a census-designated place in Butte County, California, United States. It lies at an elevation of 3,550 feet (1,082 m). Clipper Mills has a post office, first established in 1861 and moved in 1891. Its zip code is 95930. Clipper Mills's population was 160 at the 2020 census.

Clipper Mills' history and economy are centered on the lumber industry. A sawmill started operating nearby, in 1852, and by 1855, Clipper Mills had its own sawmills.

== Demographics ==
Historical population
Census	Pop.	Note	%±
2010	142		—
2020	160		12.7%
U.S. Decennial Census; 2010

=== 2020 census ===
As of the 2020 census, Clipper Mills had a population of 160. The population density was 92.0 inhabitants per square mile (35.5/km^{2}). The median age was 60.1 years. 16.9% of residents were under the age of 18, 3.8% aged 18 to 24, 15.6% aged 25 to 44, 24.4% aged 45 to 64, and 39.4% were 65 years of age or older. There were 78 males and 82 females; for every 100 females there were 95.1 males, and for every 100 females age 18 and over there were 92.8 males age 18 and over.

0.0% of residents lived in urban areas, while 100.0% lived in rural areas. The whole population lived in households; no one lived in non-institutionalized group quarters and no one was institutionalized.

There were 80 households in Clipper Mills, of which 25.0% had children under the age of 18 living in them. Of all households, 38.8% were married-couple households, 15.0% were cohabiting couple households, 22.5% were households with a male householder and no spouse or partner present, and 23.8% were households with a female householder and no spouse or partner present. About 31.3% of all households were made up of individuals and 16.3% had someone living alone who was 65 years of age or older. The average household size was 2.0. There were 45 families (56.2% of all households).

There were 141 housing units at an average density of 81.1 units per square mile (31.3 units/km^{2}), of which 80 (56.7%) were occupied and 43.3% were vacant. The homeowner vacancy rate was 1.5% and the rental vacancy rate was 0.0%. Of occupied units, 82.5% were owner-occupied and 17.5% were renter-occupied.

Racial composition as of the 2020 census
Race	Number	Percent
White	140	87.5%
Black or African American	0	0.0%
American Indian and Alaska Native	3	1.9%
Asian	2	1.2%
Native Hawaiian and Other Pacific Islander	0	0.0%
Some other race	2	1.2%
Two or more races	13	8.1%
Hispanic or Latino (of any race)	12	7.5%

=== 2010 census ===
Clipper Mills first appeared as a census designated place in the 2010 U.S. census.

== Climate ==
This region experiences warm (but not hot) and dry summers, with no average monthly temperatures above 71.6 °F. According to the Köppen Climate Classification system, Clipper Mills has a warm-summer Mediterranean climate, abbreviated "Csb" on climate maps.

== Education ==
It is in the Marysville Joint Unified School District.
