= Palermo Union School District =

School district in California, United States

Address
- 7390 Bulldog Way Palermo, California, 95968; United States

District information
- Type: Public
- Grades: K–8
- NCES District ID: 0629540

Students and staff
- Students: 1,278
- Teachers: 59.75 (FTE)
- Staff: 64.53 (FTE)
- Student–teacher ratio: 21.39

Other information
- Website: www.palermoschools.org

Palermo Union School District (PUSD) is a public school district based in Butte County, California, United States.

== Boundary ==
The district includes a small portion of the municipality of Oroville, as well as all of the Honcut census-designated place, most of the Palermo CDP, and portions of the Oroville East, and South Oroville CDPs.
