= Ranchaero Airport =

Airport in California, US

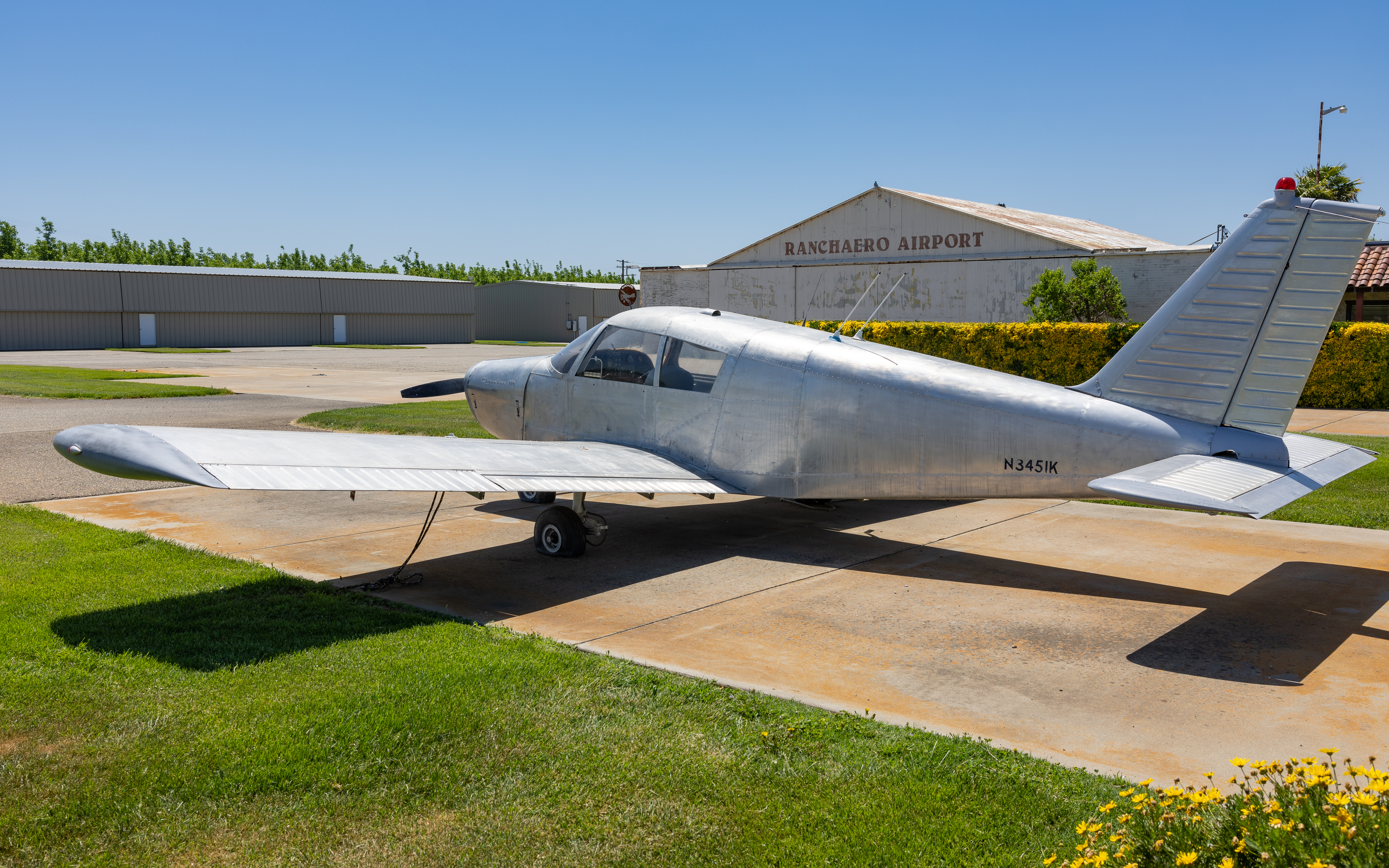
- IATA: none; ICAO: none; FAA LID: CL56

Summary
- Airport type: Private
- Owner: Ranchaero Inc.
- Serves: Chico, California
- Elevation AMSL: 173 ft / 53 m
- Coordinates: 39°43′10″N 121°52′14″W

Map
- Location

Runways
Direction	Length		Surface
Direction	ft	m	Surface
14/32	2,156	657	Asphalt

Statistics (2004)
- Aircraft operations: 5,000
- Based aircraft: 34
- Source: Federal Aviation Administration

Ranchaero Airport (FAA LID: CL56, formerly O23) is a private-use airport a mile west of Chico, in Butte County, California.

Until 2009 it was a public-use airport with the FAA identifier O23.

== Facilities ==
Ranchaero Airport covers 23 acres (9 ha) at an elevation of 173 feet (53 m). Its runway, 14/32, is 2,156 by 30 feet (657 x 9 m).

In 2004 the airport had 5,000 general aviation aircraft operations, average 13 per day. 34 aircraft were then based at this airport: 88% single-engine and 12% helicopter.
