= Oroville East, California =

- census-designated place
- Location in Butte County and the state of California

- Location in the United States
- Coordinates: 39°30′42″N 121°30′16″W
- Country: United States
- State: California
- County: Butte

Government
  - State Senator: Megan Dahle (R)
  - State Assembly: Vacant
  - U. S. Congress: James Gallagher (R)

Area
  - Total: 21.757 sq mi (56.350 km^{2})
  - Land: 21.597 sq mi (55.936 km^{2})
  - Water: 0.160 sq mi (0.414 km^{2}) 0.74%

Population (2020)
  - Total: 8,038
  - Density: 372.2/sq mi (143.7/km^{2})
- Time zone: UTC-8 (PST)
  - Summer (DST): UTC-7 (PDT)
- ZIP code: 95965
- Area codes: 530, 837
- FIPS code: 06-54388
- GNIS feature IDs: 2409001

Oroville East or Kelly Ridge is a census-designated place (CDP) in Butte County, California, United States. The population was 8,038 at the 2020 census, down from 8,280 at the 2010 census. Most citizens are dependent on the commerce of Oroville, and the vast majority of high school students in Kelly Ridge (Oroville East) attend Las Plumas High School. The community of Kelly Ridge sits at Lake Oroville and offers direct access to boating, camping, fishing and a variety of water sports.

== Geography ==
Oroville East is located at 39°30′42″N 121°30′16″W (39.511805, -121.504345).

According to the United States Census Bureau, the CDP has a total area of 21.8 square miles (56 km^{2}), of which 21.6 square miles (56 km^{2}) is land and 0.2 square miles (0.52 km^{2}) (0.74%) is water.

== Demographics ==
Historical population
Census	Pop.	Note	%±
1990	8,462		—
2000	8,680		2.6%
2010	8,280		−4.6%
2020	8,038		−2.9%
U.S. Decennial Census; 1860–1870 1880-1890; 1900 1910 1920; 1930 1940 1950; 1960 1970 1980; 1990 2000 2010; 2020

Oroville East first appeared as a census-designated place in the 1980 United States census.

=== Racial and ethnic composition ===
Oroville East CDP, California – Racial and ethnic composition Note: the US Census treats Hispanic/Latino as an ethnic category. This table excludes Latinos from the racial categories and assigns them to a separate category. Hispanics/Latinos may be of any race.
Race / Ethnicity (NH = Non-Hispanic)	Pop 2000	Pop 2010	Pop 2020	% 2000	% 2010	% 2020
White alone (NH)	7,663	6,417	5,761	88.28%	77.50%	71.67%
Black or African American alone (NH)	57	119	80	0.66%	1.44%	1.00%
Native American or Alaska Native alone (NH)	238	428	345	2.74%	5.17%	4.29%
Asian alone (NH)	80	292	324	0.92%	3.53%	4.03%
Native Hawaiian or Pacific Islander alone (NH)	14	7	10	0.16%	0.08%	0.12%
Other race alone (NH)	19	6	38	0.22%	0.07%	0.47%
Mixed race or Multiracial (NH)	213	309	572	2.45%	3.73%	7.12%
Hispanic or Latino (any race)	396	702	908	4.56%	8.48%	11.30%
Total	8,680	8,280	8,038	100.00%	100.00%	100.00%

=== 2020 census ===
As of the 2020 census, Oroville East had a population of 8,038. The population density was 372.2 inhabitants per square mile (143.7/km^{2}). The racial makeup of the CDP was 75.5% White, 1.1% African American, 5.4% Native American, 4.1% Asian, 0.1% Pacific Islander, 3.1% from other races, and 10.7% from two or more races. Hispanic or Latino of any race were 11.3% of the population.

The age distribution was 19.8% under the age of 18, 5.8% aged 18 to 24, 21.0% aged 25 to 44, 26.2% aged 45 to 64, and 27.3% who were 65 years of age or older. The median age was 48.6 years. For every 100 females, there were 97.2 males, and for every 100 females age 18 and over, there were 98.2 males.

The census reported that 99.9% of the population lived in households, 0.1% lived in non-institutionalized group quarters, and no one was institutionalized.

There were 3,180 households, out of which 24.9% included children under the age of 18, 53.1% were married-couple households, 7.0% were cohabiting couple households, 22.8% had a female householder with no partner present, and 17.1% had a male householder with no partner present. 24.9% of households were one person, and 15.6% were one person aged 65 or older. The average household size was 2.52. There were 2,162 families (68.0% of all households).

There were 3,439 housing units at an average density of 159.2 units per square mile (61.5 units/km^{2}), of which 3,180 (92.5%) were occupied and 259 (7.5%) were vacant. Of occupied units, 82.0% were owner-occupied and 18.0% were occupied by renters. The homeowner vacancy rate was 1.5% and the rental vacancy rate was 6.0%.

69.8% of residents lived in urban areas, while 30.2% lived in rural areas.

=== Demographic estimates ===
In 2023, the US Census Bureau estimated that 4.2% of the population were foreign-born. Of all people aged 5 or older, 92.1% spoke only English at home, 2.6% spoke Spanish, 3.2% spoke other Indo-European languages, 2.1% spoke Asian or Pacific Islander languages, and 0.1% spoke other languages. Of those aged 25 or older, 91.5% were high school graduates and 21.0% had a bachelor's degree.

=== Income and poverty ===
The median household income in 2023 was $86,932, and the per capita income was $44,936. About 4.7% of families and 11.0% of the population were below the poverty line.

=== 2010 census ===
The 2010 United States census reported that Oroville East had a population of 8,280. The population density was 370.9 inhabitants per square mile (143.2/km^{2}). The racial makeup of Oroville East was 6,830 (82.5%) White, 126 (1.5%) African American, 477 (5.8%) Native American, 294 (3.6%) Asian, 8 (0.1%) Pacific Islander, 147 (1.8%) from other races, and 398 (4.8%) from two or more races. Hispanic or Latino of any race were 702 persons (8.5%).

The Census reported that 8,265 people (99.8% of the population) lived in households, 15 (0.2%) lived in non-institutionalized group quarters, and 0 (0%) were institutionalized.

There were 3,349 households, out of which 856 (25.6%) had children under the age of 18 living in them, 1,775 (53.0%) were opposite-sex married couples living together, 348 (10.4%) had a female householder with no husband present, 181 (5.4%) had a male householder with no wife present. There were 245 (7.3%) unmarried opposite-sex partnerships, and 25 (0.7%) same-sex married couples or partnerships. 847 households (25.3%) were made up of individuals, and 486 (14.5%) had someone living alone who was 65 years of age or older. The average household size was 2.47. There were 2,304 families (68.8% of all households); the average family size was 2.91.

The population age distribution is 1,665 people (20.1%) under the age of 18, 578 people (7.0%) aged 18 to 24, 1,490 people (18.0%) aged 25 to 44, 2,638 people (31.9%) aged 45 to 64, and 1,909 people (23.1%) who were 65 years of age or older. The median age was 48.8 years. For every 100 females, there were 97.5 males. For every 100 females age 18 and over, there were 95.5 males.

There were 3,674 housing units at an average density of 164.6 per square mile (63.6/km^{2}), of which 3,349 were occupied, of which 2,701 (80.7%) were owner-occupied, and 648 (19.3%) were occupied by renters. The homeowner vacancy rate was 3.2%; the rental vacancy rate was 9.0%. 6,414 people (77.5% of the population) lived in owner-occupied housing units and 1,851 people (22.4%) lived in rental housing units.

== Education ==
Most of the CDP is served by the Oroville City Elementary School District, while a small piece extends into the Palermo Union Elementary School District. All students attend high school in the Oroville Union High School District.
