= KPAY =

KPAY may refer to:

- KPAY (AM), a radio station (1290 AM) licensed to serve Chico, California, United States
- KPAY-FM, a radio station (93.9 FM) licensed to serve Chico, California
