= KQPT =

KQPT may refer to:

- KQPT-LP, a defunct low-power radio station (106.1 FM) formerly licensed to serve Sacramento, California, United States
- KZSZ, a radio station (107.5 FM) licensed to serve Colusa, California, which held the call sign KQPT from 2000 to 2019
- KIID, a radio station (1470 AM) licensed to serve Sacramento, California, which held the call sign KQPT from 1997 to 1998
- KZZO, a radio station (100.5 FM) licensed to serve Sacramento, California, which held the call sign KQPT from 1988 to 1997
