= KHSL-FM =

Radio station in Paradise, California, United States

Coordinates: 39.958°N 121.715°W

Paradise, California; United States
- Broadcast area: Chico, California
- Frequency: 103.5 MHz
- Branding: 103.5 The Blaze

Programming
- Format: Country
- Affiliations: Westwood One

Ownership
- Owner: Deer Creek Broadcasting LLC
- Sister stations: KZAP; KMXI; KPAY (AM); KPAY-FM

History
- First air date: 1992
- Call sign meaning: Harry Smithson/Sidney Lewis

Technical information
- Licensing authority: FCC
- Facility ID: 22974
- Class: B1
- ERP: 1,500 watts
- HAAT: 400 meters (1,300 ft)

Links
- Public license information: Public file; LMS
- Webcast: Listen live
- Website: www.1035theblaze.com

KHSL-FM (103.5 MHz, "The Blaze") is a country music formatted radio station based in Chico, California. It is owned and operated by Deer Creek Broadcasting and Digital Interactive LLC, which also owns News-Talk 93.9 KPAY-FM (formerly KFMF-FM), KPAY Fox Sports 1290 AM /102.9 FM, Mix 95.1 Lite Rock KMXI-FM, KZAP-FM 96.7 Classic Rock and formerly owner of Regional Spanish station KHHZ-FM 97.7 (known as La Gran X/Radio Mexico), now owned by Bustos Media. The station's partner and general manager is longtime Chico media personality Dino Corbin, who served as general manager at KHSL-TV for over 20 years and has served the community in broadcasting for 50 years. The program director and morning personality is Mike Wessels. The distinction of the longest-tenured on-air talent at the station goes to Moriss Taylor, who has been a fixture at the station for seven decades. (Taylor is now deceased.)

== History ==
KHSL Radio began in Chico, CA, in 1935 at the request of the Chico Chamber of Commerce. Two people, Harry Smithson and Sidney Lewis, put KHSL-AM on the air. The first letters of these gentlemen's first and last names form the call letters (KHSL). Over the years these call letters have become an institution in the Northstate.

In 1936, KHSL was purchased by Hugh and Mickey McClung of the Golden Empire Broadcasting Company. In 1953 the McClungs signed on the first commercial television in the North state, KHSL-TV. Golden Empire Broadcasting Company, which included KHSL-AM (1290) and KHSL-TV, was owned by the McClungs until October 1994, and, until the sale, was one of the last original family-owned broadcast companies in the country. Mickey McClung was noted as one of the first female broadcast pioneers in the industry. (Source: Original KHSL website: no longer exists).
