= KHSL =

KHSL may refer to:

- KHSL-FM, a radio station (103.5 FM) licensed to Paradise, California, United States
- KHSL-TV, a television station (channel 36, virtual 12) licensed to Chico, California, United States
