= Little Chico Creek =

Coordinates: 39°36′59″N 121°56′19″W

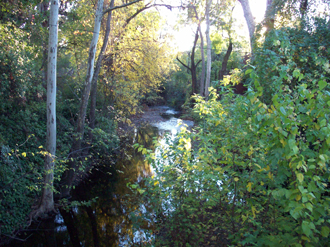
- Little Chico Creek as viewed from the bridge on Chestnut Street looking westward

Location
- Country: United States
- State: California

Physical characteristics
- Source
  - location: Sierra Nevada
- Mouth
  - location: Butte Creek

Basin features
- Tributaries
  - right: Dead Horse Slough

Little Chico Creek is a perennial stream in Butte County, California. It descends the Sierra Nevada foothills from a spring off Headwaters Road in Forest Ranch, CA, flowing westward into the Parrot Grant which is just south of Ord Ferry Road and west of Seven Mile Lane where it just disappears.

The creek flows through the city Chico, where it bounds the downtown area on its south side. It can be seen in Chico from Highway 99 just south of the Chester/Orland exit; from the Park Avenue bridge just south of downtown; and from where Dayton Road begins. There is a greenway adjacent to the creek with a path that follows Humboldt Road. This path provides access to a footbridge over the creek that goes into a residential area. In the area just west of the town's railroad tracks its flow becomes seasonal, with most or all of its water infiltrating into the ground by summer.

Dead Horse Slough is a tributary of Little Chico Creek.

== See also ==
- Big Chico Creek
