= KMXI =

Coordinates: 39.946°N 121.722°W

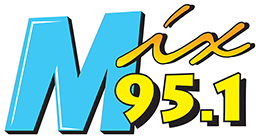
- Chico, California; United States
- Broadcast area: Chico; Red Bluff
- Frequency: 95.1 MHz
- Branding: Mix 95.1

Programming
- Format: Adult contemporary

Ownership
- Owner: Deer Creek Broadcasting, LLC
- Sister stations: KHHZ, KHSL, KPAY

History
- First air date: November 16, 1972
- Former call signs: KPAY-FM (1972–1994)

Technical information
- Licensing authority: FCC
- Facility ID: 40843
- Class: B
- ERP: 8,700 watts
- HAAT: 357 meters (1,171 ft)

Links
- Public license information: Public file; LMS
- Webcast: Listen live
- Website: kmxi.com

KMXI is a commercial radio station located in Chico, California, United States, broadcasting on 95.1 FM. KMXI airs an adult contemporary music format branded as "Today's Lite Rock Mix 95.1".

== History ==
The station began on November 16, 1972, as KPAY-FM with a beautiful music format until 1987, when they shifted to an adult contemporary format. On April 1, 1994, they changed their call letters to KMXI, now known as "Mix 95.1".

== Personalities and shows ==
- Dori in the Morning| Dori McKay | 6:00am–9:00am PST
- No repeat Workday | Robin Scott | 9:00am–3:00pm PST
- Drive At Five | Mark Chase | 3:00pm–7:00pm PST
- TK Live | Tom Kent Radio Network | 7:00pm-midnight PST
