= Chico, California =

City in California, United States

- City
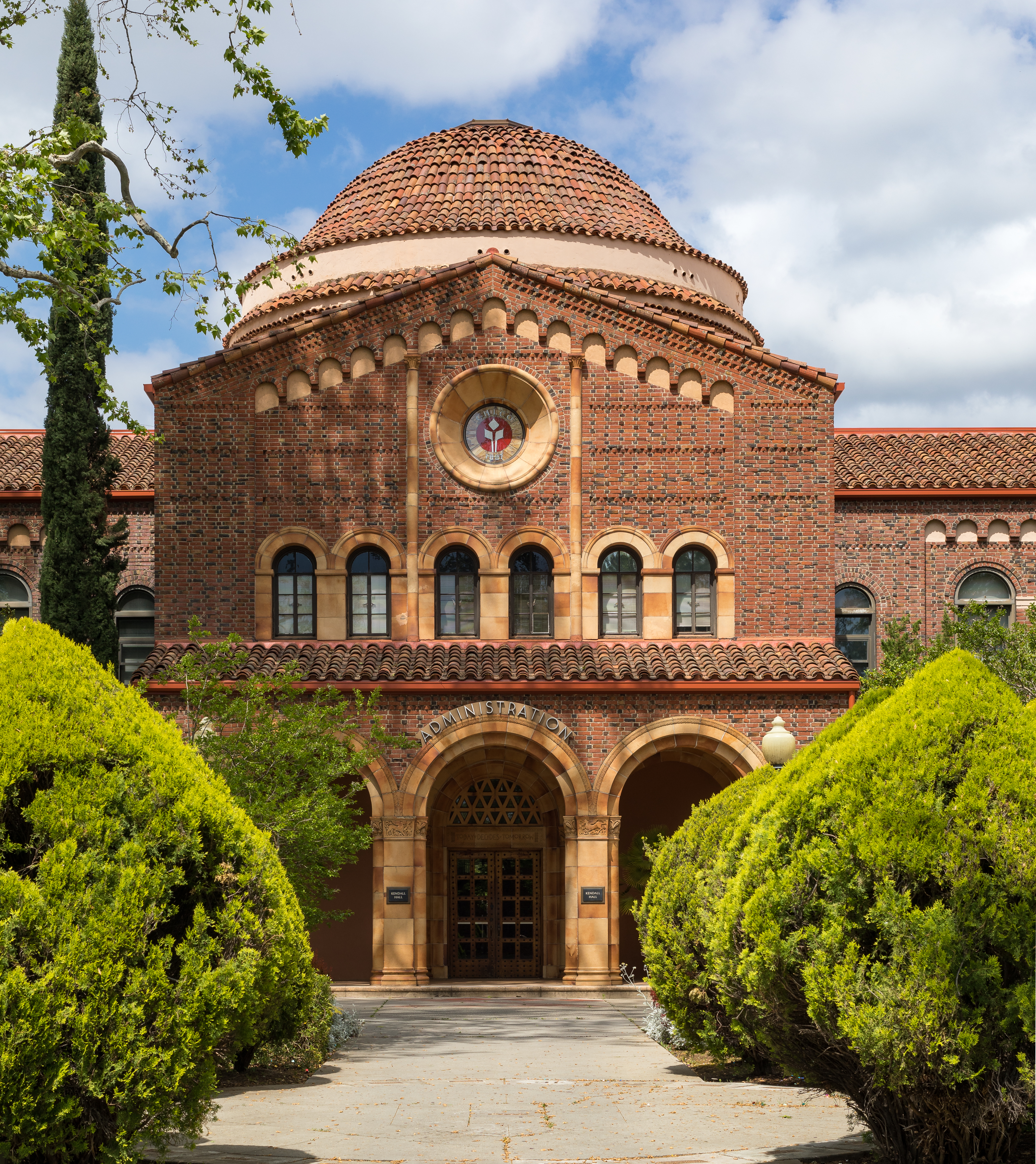
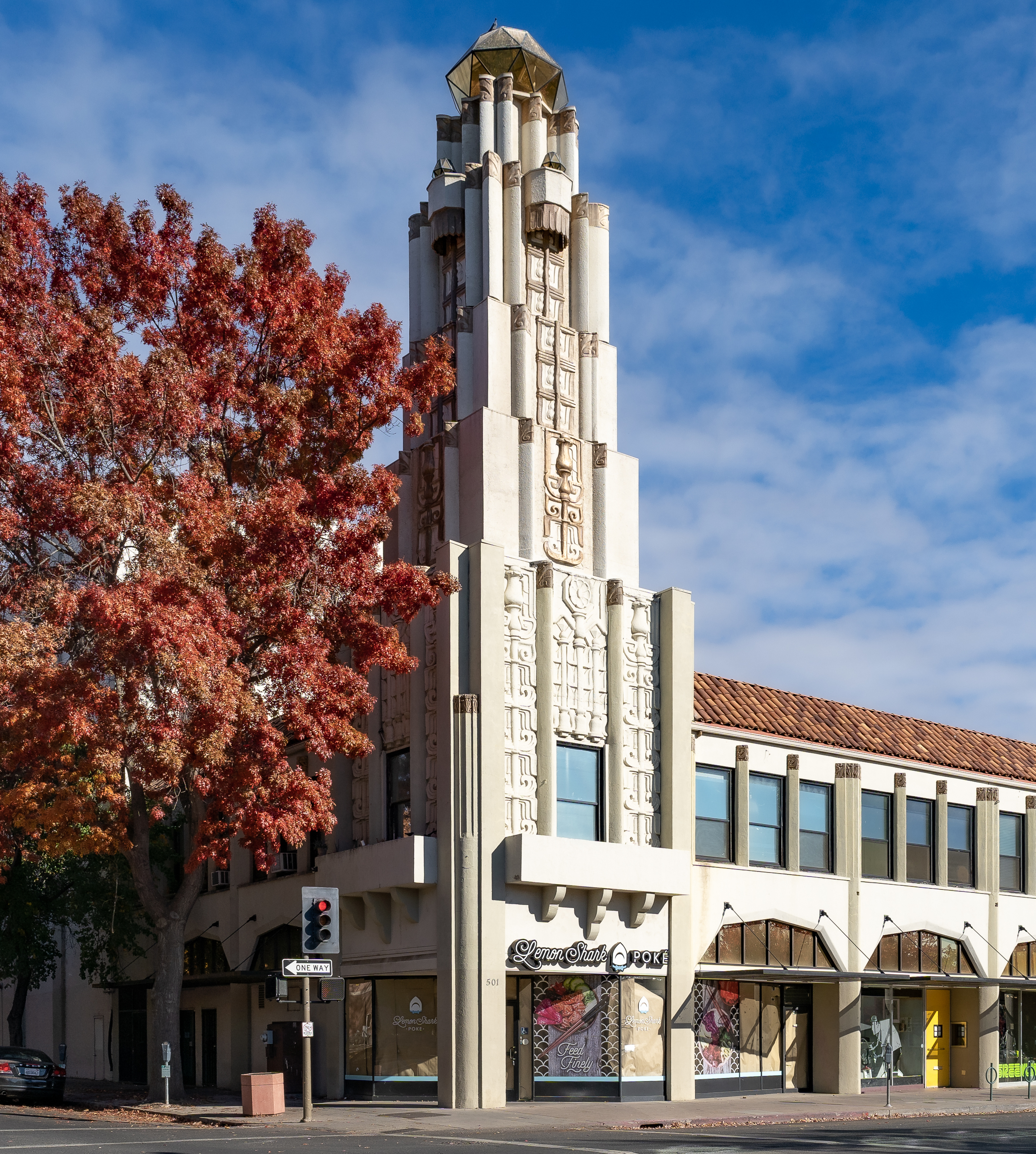
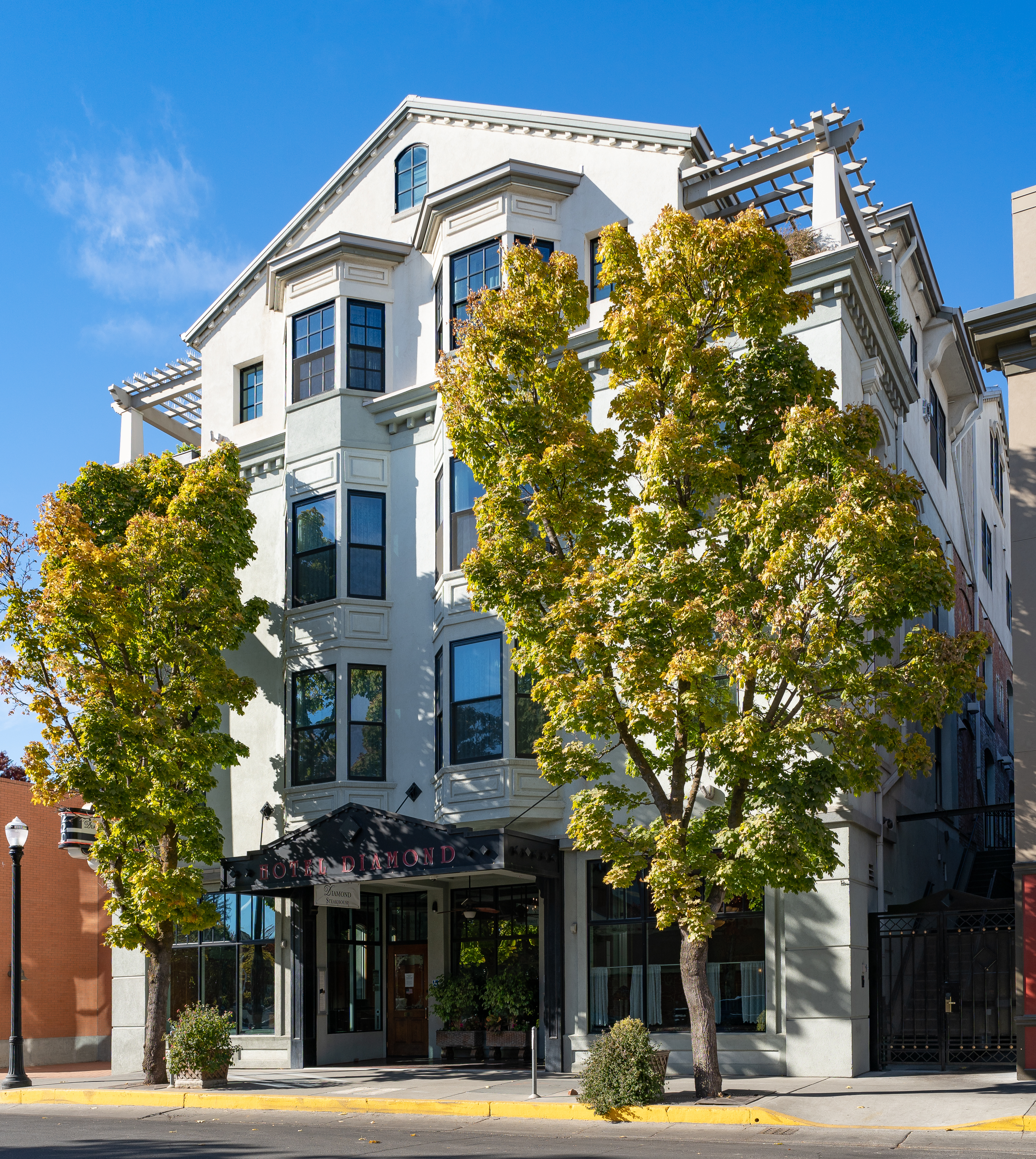
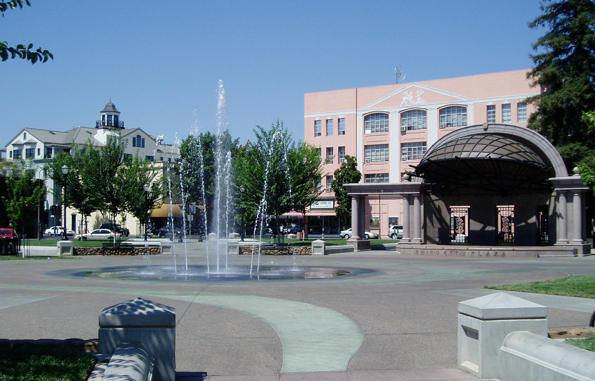
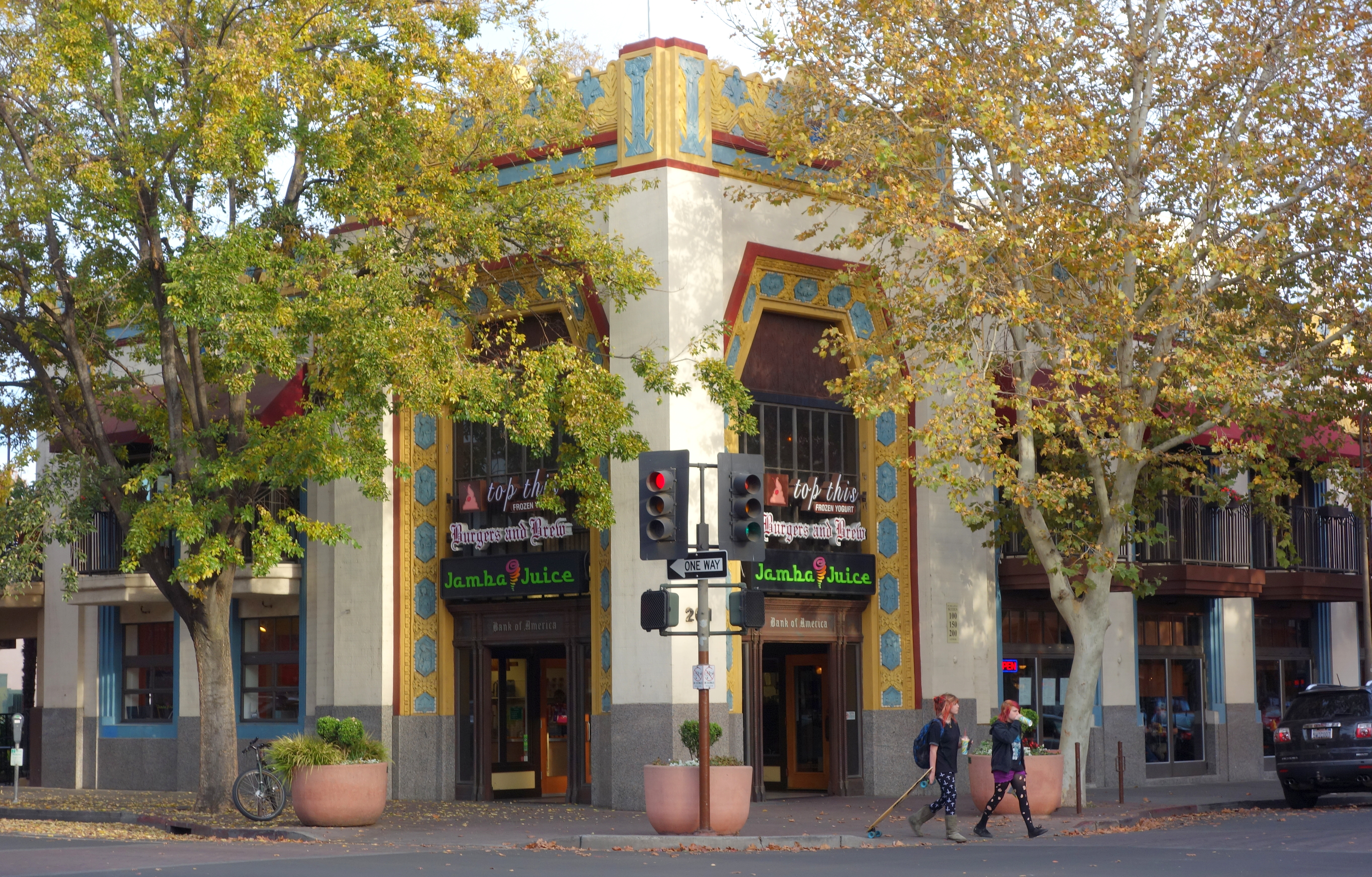
- California State University, Chico Senator Theatre Diamond Hotel Chico Plaza Downtown Chico

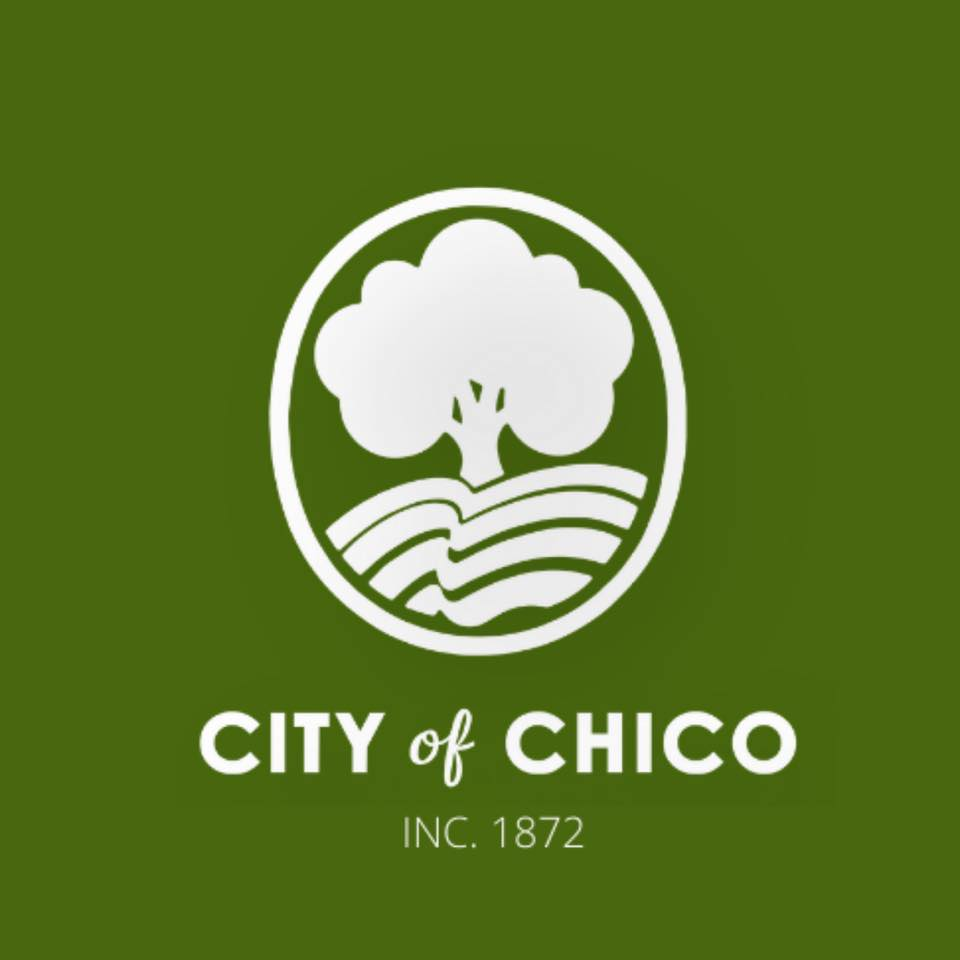
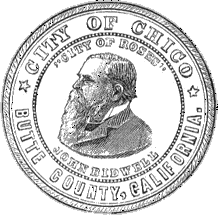
- Flag Seal
- Nicknames: "City of Trees", "City of Roses"
- Interactive map of Chico, California
- Location in the United States
- Coordinates: 39°44′24″N 121°50′8″W
- Country: United States
- State: California
- County: Butte
- Founded: 1860
- Incorporated: January 8, 1872
- Founder: John Bidwell

Government
  - Type: Council–manager government
  - Mayor: Kacey Reynolds
  - City Manager: Mark Sorensen
  - State Legislators: Sen. Megan Dahle (R); Asm. Vacant

Area
  - City: 34.62 sq mi (89.67 km^{2})
  - Land: 34.45 sq mi (89.23 km^{2})
  - Water: 0.17 sq mi (0.45 km^{2}) 0.52%
- Elevation: 243 ft (74 m)

Population (2020)
  - City: 101,475
  - Rank: 72nd in California; 330th in the United States
  - Density: 2,945.4/sq mi (1,137.24/km^{2})
  - Metro: 211,632
- Demonym: Chicoan
- Time zone: UTC−8 (Pacific)
  - Summer (DST): UTC−7 (PDT)
- ZIP Codes: 95926–95929, 95973, 95976
- Area code: 530, 837
- FIPS code: 06-13014
- GNIS feature ID: 2409447
- Website: chicoca.gov

Chico (/ˈtʃiːkoʊ/ CHEE-koh; Spanish for "boy" or "small/little") is the most populous city in Butte County, California, United States. Located in the Sacramento Valley region of Northern California, the city had a population of 101,475 in the 2020 census, an increase from 86,187 in the 2010 census. Chico is the cultural and economic center of the northern Sacramento Valley, as well as the most populous city in California north of the capital city of Sacramento. The city is known as a college town, as the home of California State University, Chico, and for Bidwell Park, one of the largest urban parks in the world.

== History ==
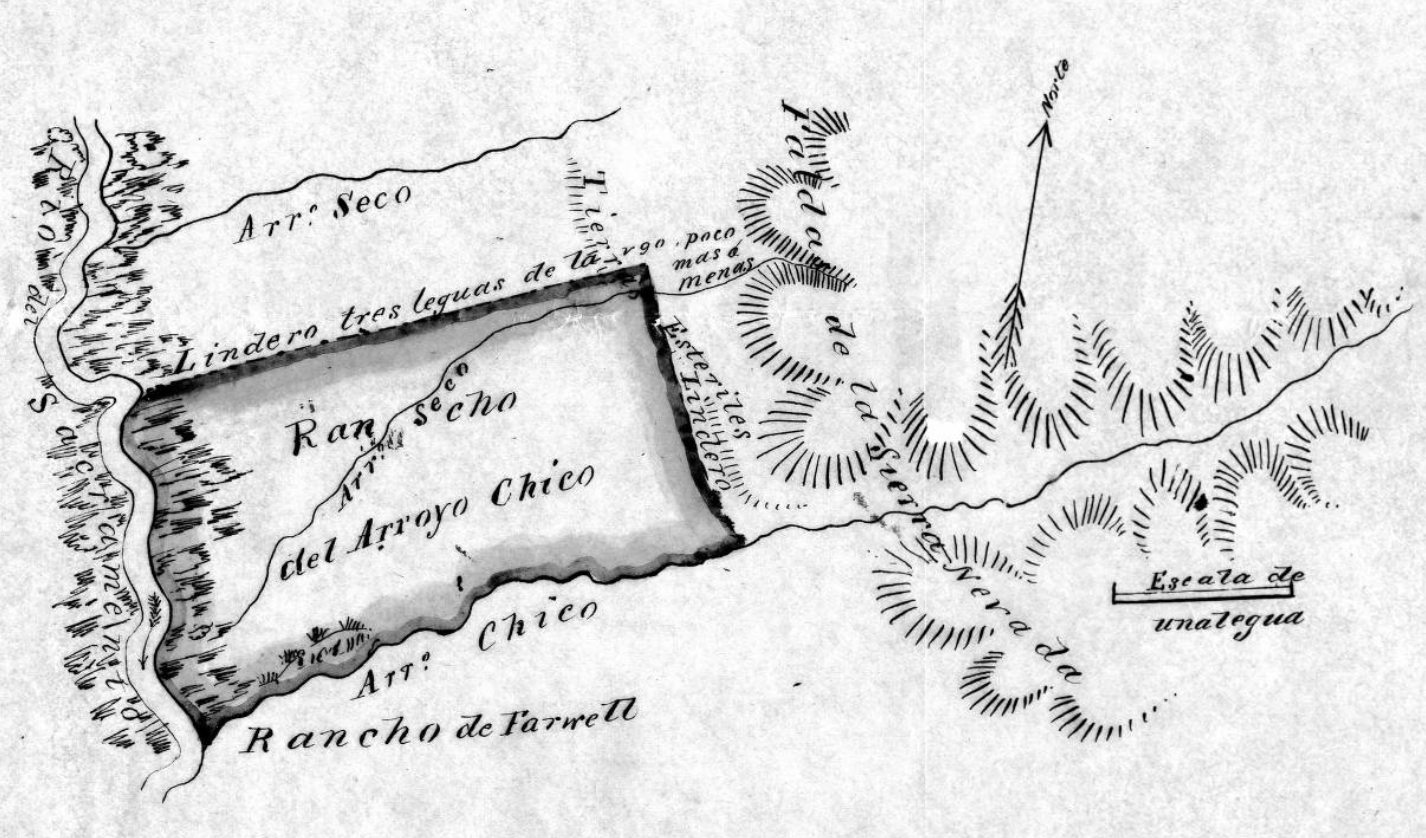
Chico's origins lie in Rancho del Arroyo Chico, a Mexican-era rancho granted by Governor Manuel Micheltorena in 1844.

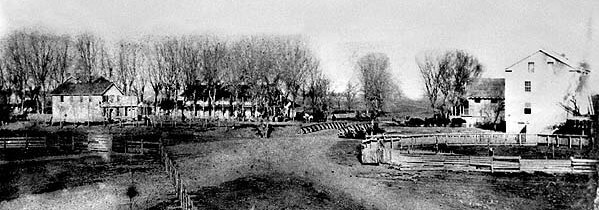
View of Chico in 1856

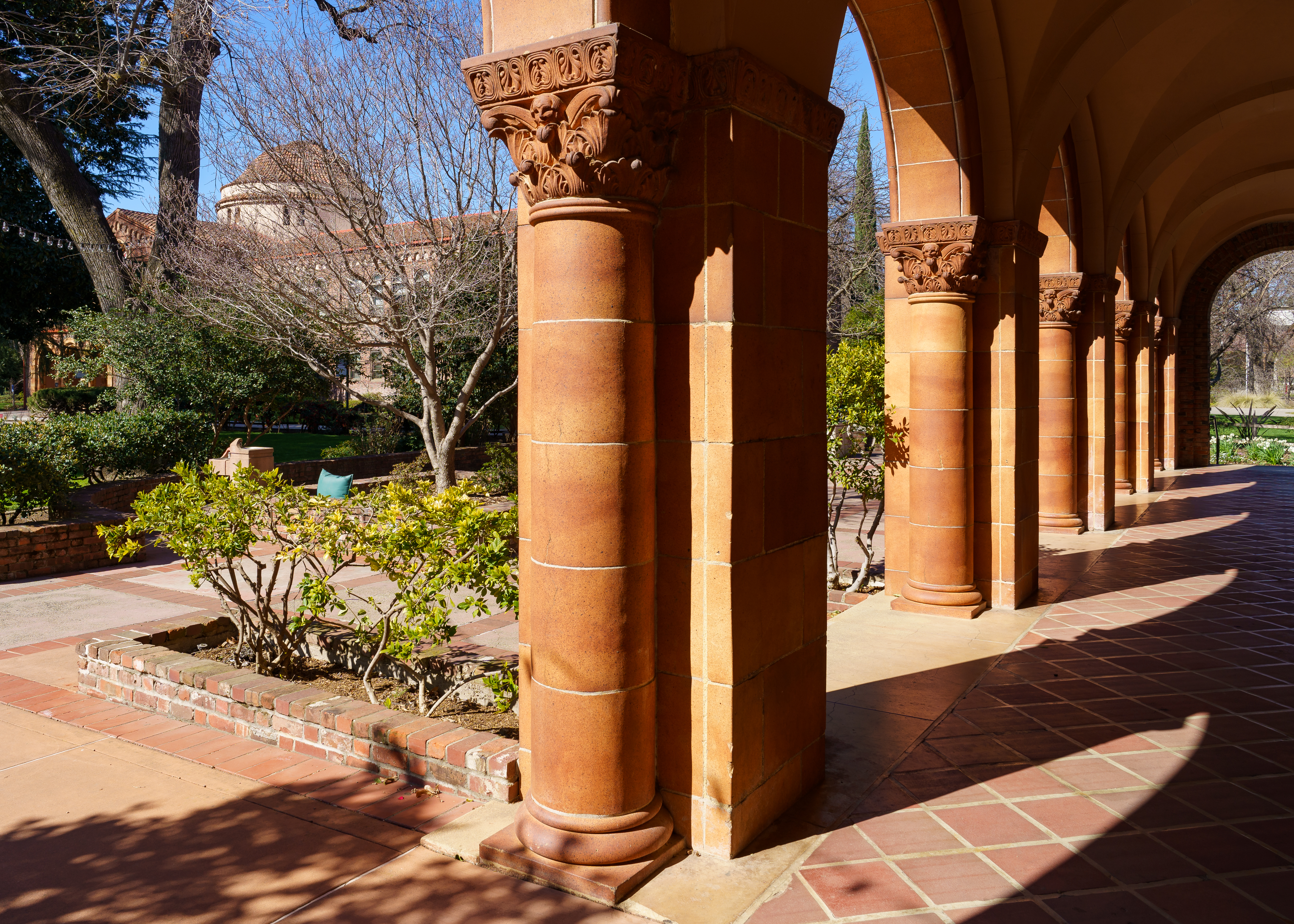
California State University, Chico was founded in 1887.

The first known inhabitants of the area now known as Chico—a Spanish word meaning "little", "small", or "boy" — were the Mechoopda Maidu Native Americans. Within the boundaries of modern day Chico, there existed a Maidu village, whose name was recorded as Bah-hahp'-ke, meaning "straight tree".

The City of Chico was founded in 1860 by John Bidwell, a member of one of the first wagon trains to reach California in 1843. During the American Civil War, Camp Bidwell (named for John Bidwell, by then a brigadier general of the California Militia), was established a mile outside Chico, by Lt. Col. A. E. Hooker with a company of cavalry and two of infantry, on August 26, 1863.

By early 1865, it was being referred to as Camp Chico when a post called Camp Bidwell was established in northeast California, later to be Fort Bidwell. The city was incorporated on January 8, 1872.

Chico was home to a significant Chinese American community when it was first incorporated, but arsonists burned Chico's Chinatown in February 1886, driving Chinese Americans out of town.

Historian W.H. "Old Hutch" Hutchinson identified five events as the most seminal in Chico history. They included the arrival of John Bidwell in 1850, the arrival of the California and Oregon Railroad in 1870, the establishment in 1887 of the Northern Branch of the State Normal School, which later became California State University, Chico (Chico State), the purchase of the Sierra Lumber Company by the Diamond Match Company in 1900, and the development of the Army Air Base, which is now the Chico Municipal Airport.

Other events include the construction and relocation of Route 99E through town in the early 1960s, the founding of Sierra Nevada Brewing Company in 1979—what would become one of the top breweries in the nation—and the establishment of a "Green Line" on the western city limits as protection of agricultural lands.

== Geography ==
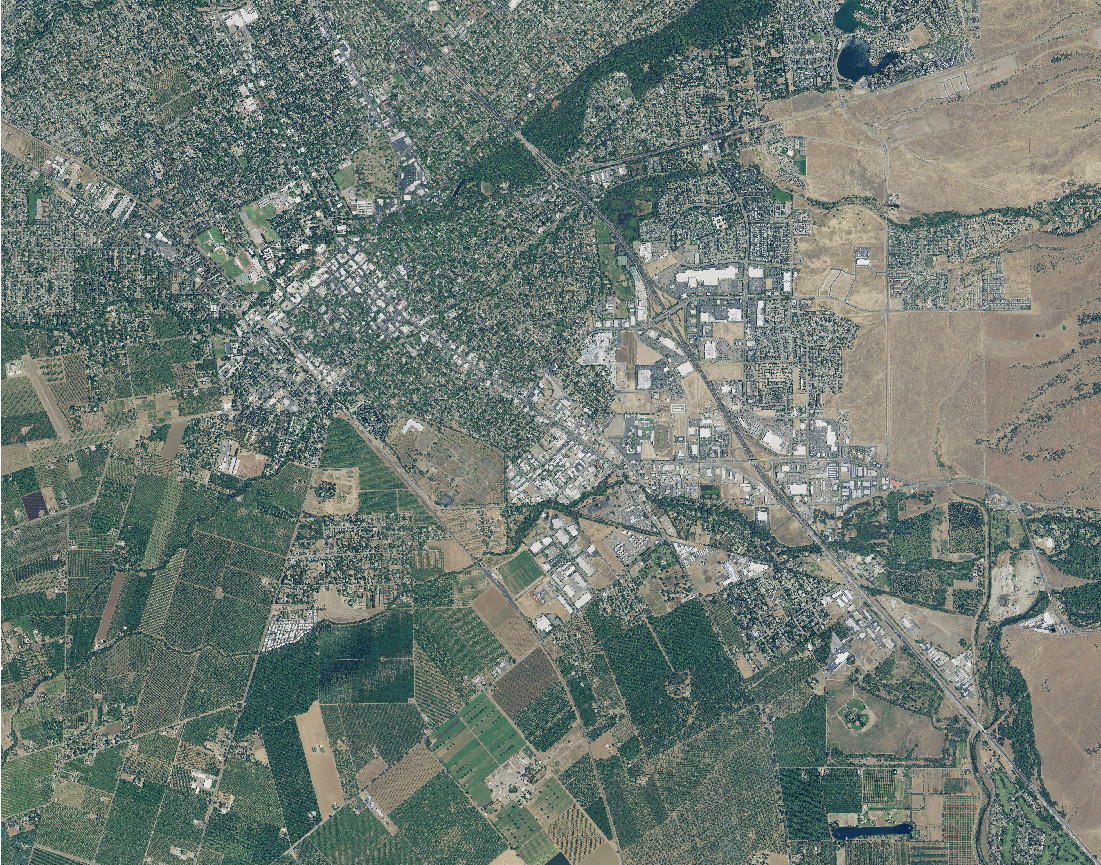
Aerial view of Chico.

Chico is at the Sacramento Valley's northeast edge, one of the richest agricultural areas in the world. The Sierra Nevada mountains lie to the east and south, with Chico's city limits venturing several miles into the foothills. To the west, the Sacramento River lies 5 miles (8 km) from the city.

Chico sits on the Sacramento Valley floor close to the foothills of the Cascade Range to the north and the Sierra Nevada range to the east and south. Big Chico Creek is the demarcation line between the ranges. The city's terrain is generally flat, with increasingly hilly terrain beginning at the eastern city limits.

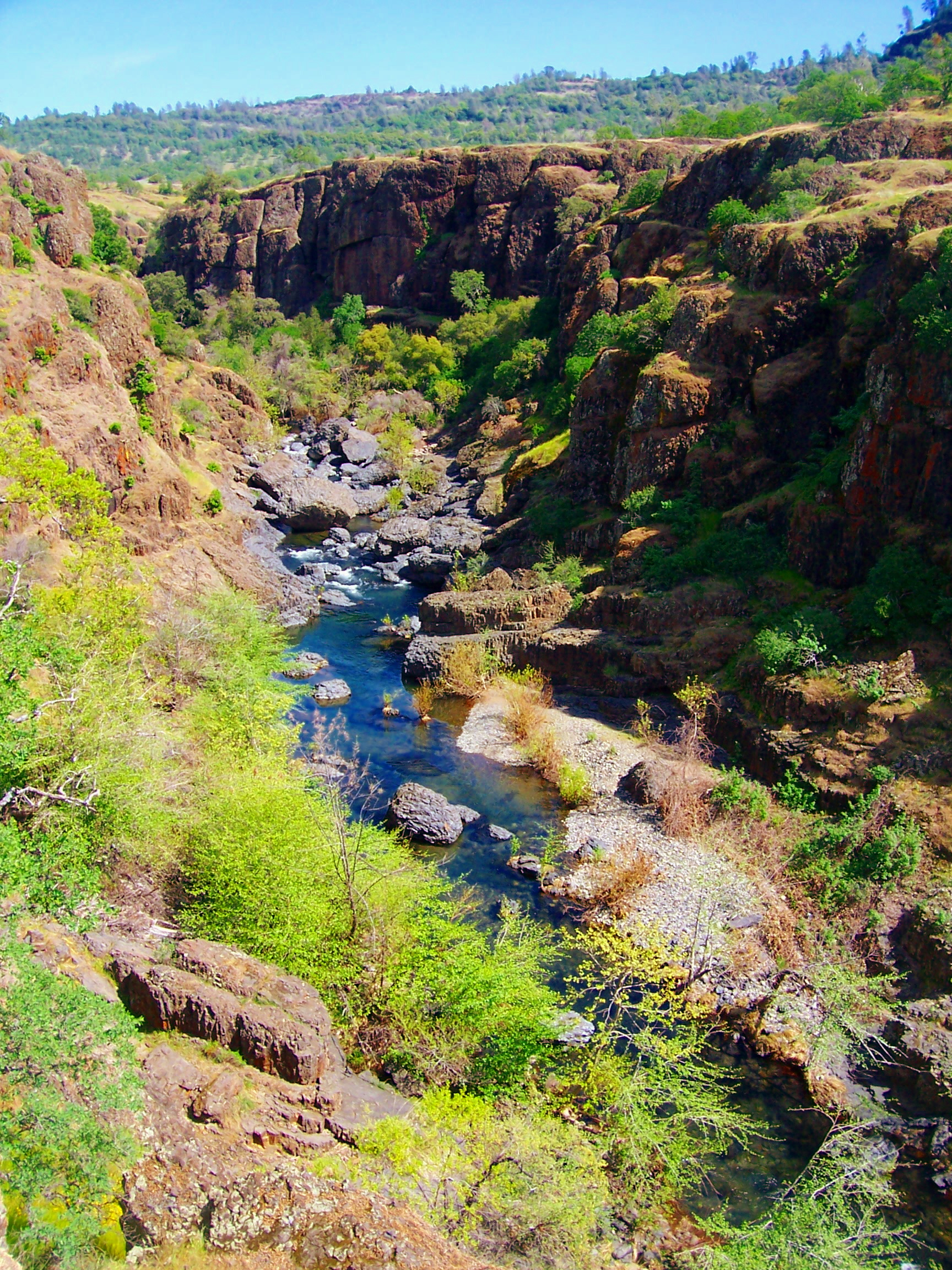
Bidwell Park.

According to the United States Census Bureau, the city has a total area of 34.3 square miles (89 km^{2}), of which 34.1 square miles (88 km^{2}) is land and 0.50% is water.

The city is bisected by Bidwell Park, which runs 5 miles (8 km) from the flat city center deep into the foothills.

The city is also traversed by two creeks and a flood channel, which feeds the Sacramento River. They are named Big Chico Creek, Little Chico Creek, and Lindo Channel (also known as Sandy Gulch, locally).

The city has been designated a Tree City USA for 31 years by the National Arbor Day Foundation.

Chico is made up of many districts and neighborhoods, including Downtown Chico, the South Campus neighborhood, and Barber.

=== Climate ===
Chico and the Sacramento Valley have a Mediterranean climate (Köppen Csa), with hot, dry summers and cool, wet winters.

Temperatures can rise well above 100 °F (38 °C) in the summer. Chico is one of the top metropolitan areas in the nation for number of clear days.

Winters are cool and wet, with the greatest rainfall occurring in January and February. July is usually the hottest month, with an average high temperature of 94 °F (34 °C) and an average low temperature of 61 °F (16 °C). January is the coolest month, with an average high temperature of 55 °F (13 °C) and an average low temperature of 35 °F (2 °C). The average annual rainfall is 27 inches (690 mm). Tule fog is sometimes present during the autumn and winter months. Snow occasionally falls in the hills east of Chico, but has become quite rare in Chico itself; February 19, 2026 was the first measurable snow in Chico since December 1988.

Climate data for Chico, California (1991–2020 normals, extremes 1906–present)
Month	Jan	Feb	Mar	Apr	May	Jun	Jul	Aug	Sep	Oct	Nov	Dec	Year
Record high °F (°C)	77 (25)	83 (28)	93 (34)	98 (37)	108 (42)	115 (46)	117 (47)	116 (47)	115 (46)	107 (42)	91 (33)	78 (26)	117 (47)
Mean maximum °F (°C)	68.2 (20.1)	73.3 (22.9)	79.0 (26.1)	88.6 (31.4)	95.8 (35.4)	103.5 (39.7)	106.1 (41.2)	105.2 (40.7)	103.5 (39.7)	93.8 (34.3)	79.1 (26.2)	67.9 (19.9)	108.5 (42.5)
Mean daily maximum °F (°C)	56.1 (13.4)	62.2 (16.8)	66.7 (19.3)	72.8 (22.7)	81.3 (27.4)	89.3 (31.8)	95.2 (35.1)	94.3 (34.6)	90.9 (32.7)	79.7 (26.5)	65.0 (18.3)	56.6 (13.7)	75.8 (24.3)
Daily mean °F (°C)	46.1 (7.8)	50.3 (10.2)	54.2 (12.3)	59.0 (15.0)	66.8 (19.3)	73.4 (23.0)	78.1 (25.6)	76.7 (24.8)	72.9 (22.7)	63.5 (17.5)	52.4 (11.3)	46.4 (8.0)	61.7 (16.5)
Mean daily minimum °F (°C)	36.2 (2.3)	38.3 (3.5)	41.6 (5.3)	45.3 (7.4)	52.2 (11.2)	57.4 (14.1)	61.0 (16.1)	59.0 (15.0)	54.9 (12.7)	47.4 (8.6)	39.8 (4.3)	36.3 (2.4)	47.4 (8.6)
Mean minimum °F (°C)	26.4 (−3.1)	29.4 (−1.4)	31.8 (−0.1)	35.5 (1.9)	42.5 (5.8)	48.4 (9.1)	53.6 (12.0)	52.4 (11.3)	46.4 (8.0)	36.8 (2.7)	29.6 (−1.3)	26.6 (−3.0)	23.8 (−4.6)
Record low °F (°C)	12 (−11)	16 (−9)	23 (−5)	27 (−3)	30 (−1)	38 (3)	40 (4)	38 (3)	35 (2)	23 (−5)	20 (−7)	11 (−12)	11 (−12)
Average precipitation inches (mm)	5.12 (130)	5.14 (131)	3.63 (92)	1.95 (50)	1.35 (34)	0.64 (16)	0.03 (0.76)	0.10 (2.5)	0.25 (6.4)	1.73 (44)	2.41 (61)	5.04 (128)	27.39 (695.66)
Average precipitation days (≥ 0.01 in)	11.4	9.9	9.1	6.0	4.4	1.9	0.2	0.5	1.9	3.8	7.2	10.2	66.5
Source 1: NOAA
Source 2: National Weather Service

== Demographics ==
Historical population
Census	Pop.	Note	%±
1880	3,300		—
1890	2,894		−12.3%
1900	2,640		−8.8%
1910	3,750		42.0%
1920	9,339		149.0%
1930	7,961		−14.8%
1940	9,287		16.7%
1950	12,272		32.1%
1960	14,757		20.2%
1970	19,580		32.7%
1980	26,716		36.4%
1990	40,079		50.0%
2000	59,954		49.6%
2010	86,187		43.8%
2020	101,475		17.7%
2025 (est.)	105,081	▲	3.6%
U.S. Decennial Census; 1860–1870 1880-1890; 1900 1910 1920; 1930 1940 1950; 1960 1970 1980; 1990 2000 2010; 2020

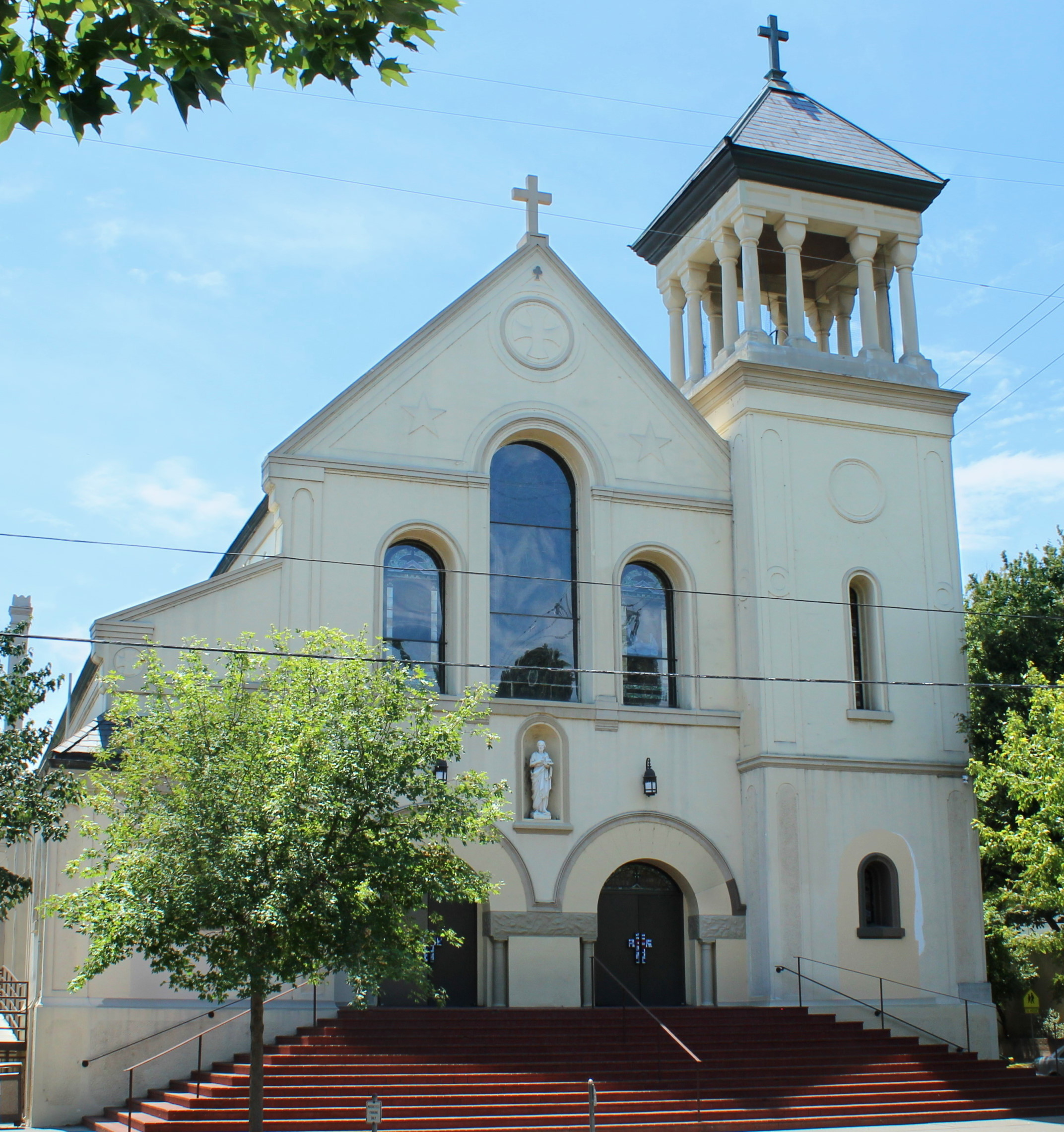
St. John the Baptist Catholic Church.

=== 2020 ===
Chico, California – Racial and ethnic composition Note: the US Census treats Hispanic/Latino as an ethnic category. This table excludes Latinos from the racial categories and assigns them to a separate category. Hispanics/Latinos may be of any race.
Race / Ethnicity (NH = Non-Hispanic)	Pop 2000	Pop 2010	Pop 2020	% 2000	% 2010	% 2020
White alone (NH)	46,258	63,561	66,361	77.16%	73.75%	65.40%
Black or African American alone (NH)	1,174	1,636	1,822	1.96%	1.90%	1.80%
Native American or Alaska Native alone (NH)	625	791	938	1.04%	0.92%	0.92%
Asian alone (NH)	2,488	3,589	4,349	4.15%	4.16%	4.29%
Pacific Islander alone (NH)	109	189	320	0.18%	0.22%	0.32%
Some Other Race alone (NH)	166	164	624	0.28%	0.19%	0.61%
Mixed Race or Multi-Racial (NH)	1,783	2,942	6,423	2.97%	3.41%	6.33%
Hispanic or Latino (any race)	7,351	13,315	20,638	12.26%	15.45%	20.34%
Total	59,954	86,187	101,475	100.00%	100.00%	100.00%

The 2020 United States census reported that Chico had a population of 101,475. The population density was 2,972.2 inhabitants per square mile (1,147.6/km^{2}). The racial makeup of Chico was 70.4% White, 2.0% African American, 1.6% Native American, 4.4% Asian, 0.4% Pacific Islander, 9.1% from other races, and 12.1% from two or more races. Hispanic or Latino of any race were 20.3% of the population.

The census reported that 96.7% of the population lived in households, 2.7% lived in non-institutionalized group quarters, and 0.6% were institutionalized.

There were 41,887 households, out of which 25.4% included children under the age of 18, 34.3% were married-couple households, 9.7% were cohabiting couple households, 32.7% had a female householder with no partner present, and 23.3% had a male householder with no partner present. 31.7% of households were one person, and 12.4% were one person aged 65 or older. The average household size was 2.34. There were 21,831 families (52.1% of all households).

The age distribution was 19.1% under the age of 18, 18.2% aged 18 to 24, 27.2% aged 25 to 44, 19.8% aged 45 to 64, and 15.8% who were 65 years of age or older. The median age was 33.2 years. For every 100 females, there were 94.1 males.

There were 44,429 housing units at an average density of 1,301.3 units per square mile (502.4 units/km^{2}), of which 41,887 (94.3%) were occupied. Of these, 43.2% were owner-occupied, and 56.8% were occupied by renters.

In 2023, the US Census Bureau estimated that the median household income in 2023 was $67,929, and the per capita income was $38,201. About 12.6% of families and 22.1% of the population were below the poverty line.

== Economy ==
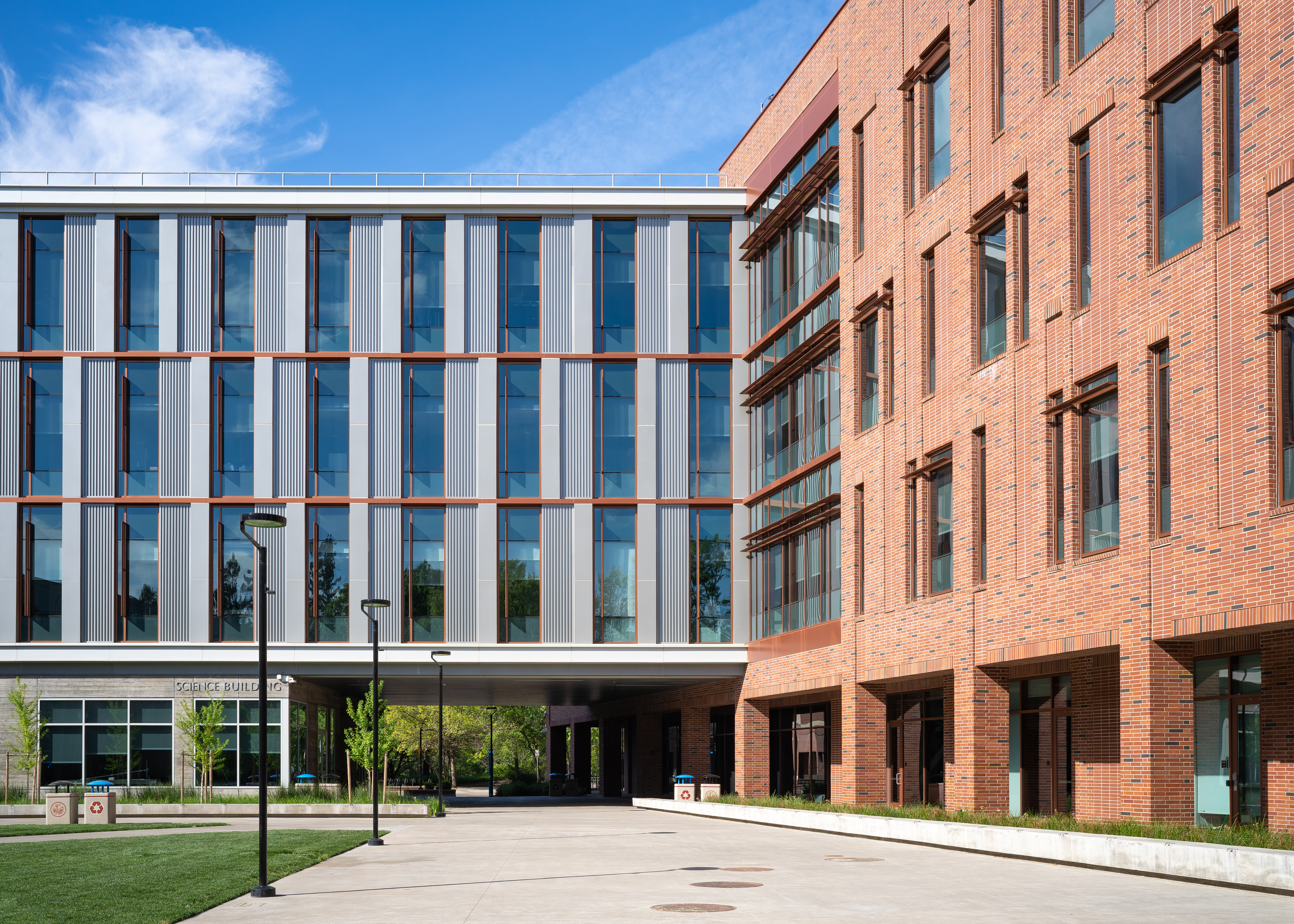
California State University, Chico Science Building.

Much of the local economy is driven by the presence of Chico State. Industries providing employment: educational, health and social services (30.3%), retail trade (14.9%), arts, entertainment, recreation, accommodation, and food services (12.6%).

Chico's downtown area includes independent retail stores and restaurants. Farmers markets are held on Saturday mornings and Thursday evenings. City Plaza hosts free concerts during the summer. The area also includes performance venues, bars, coffee shops, bookstores, and city offices.

Chico has long been a regional retail shopping destination. Chico's largest retail district is focused around the Chico Mall on East 20th Street. In the two decades since the Chico Mall was constructed, many national retailers have located nearby.

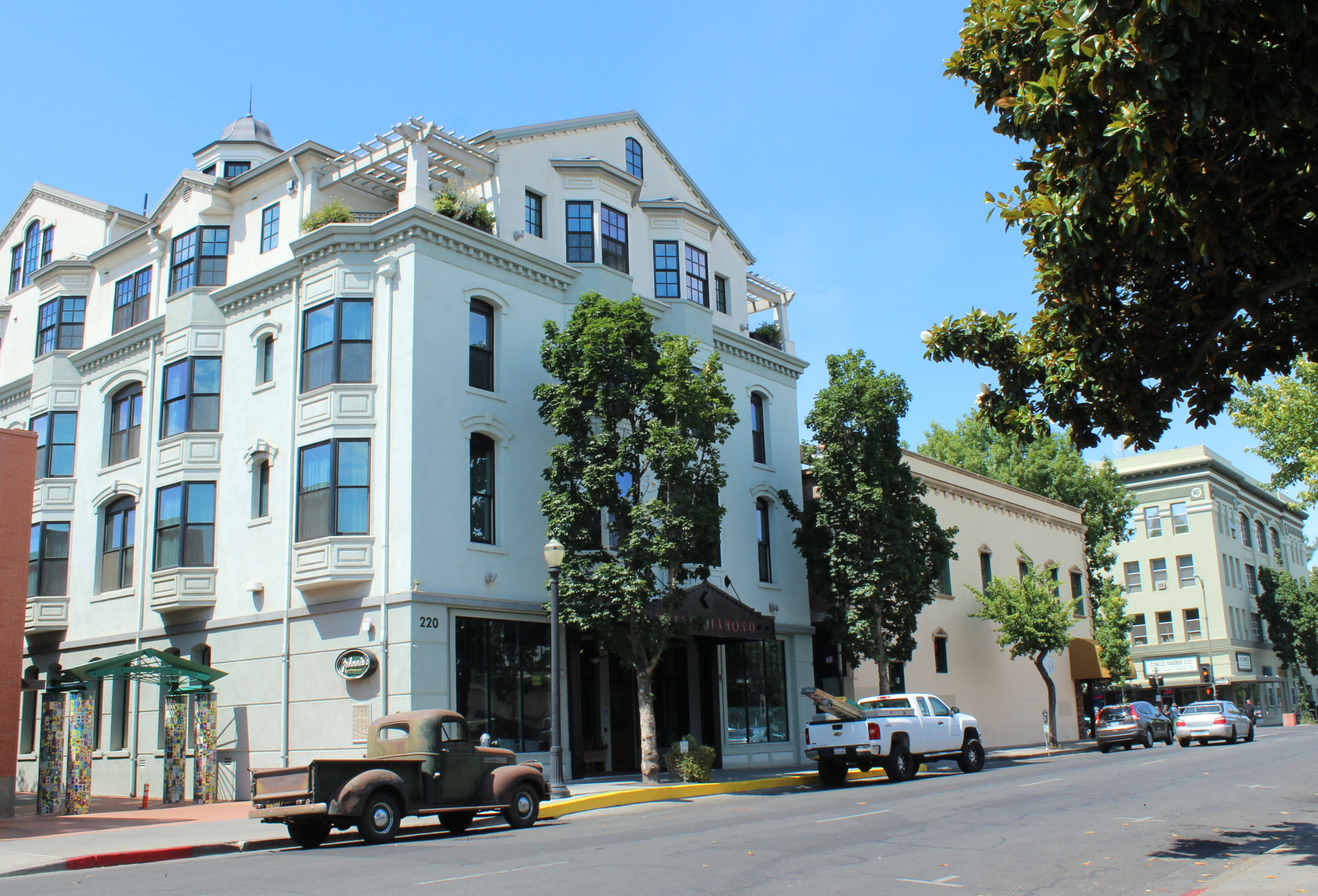
W 4th Street in Downtown Chico, with the Hotel Diamond in center.

Chico is also home to the North Valley Plaza Mall, the city's first enclosed shopping center. Construction on this mall began in 1965, and it was the county's largest shopping center until the Chico Mall was completed in 1988. For a few years, the "old" mall and the "new" mall competed against one another. The North Valley Plaza Mall was dealt a blow when JCPenney, one of the old mall's anchors, moved to the Chico Mall in 1993. The "old" mall slowly declined with increasing vacancies. After several failed attempts at revitalization, the North Valley Plaza Mall was overhauled in 2002, with the center of the mall demolished.

Sierra Nevada Brewing Company, the largest craft brewer in the U.S., is based in Chico.

=== Agriculture ===
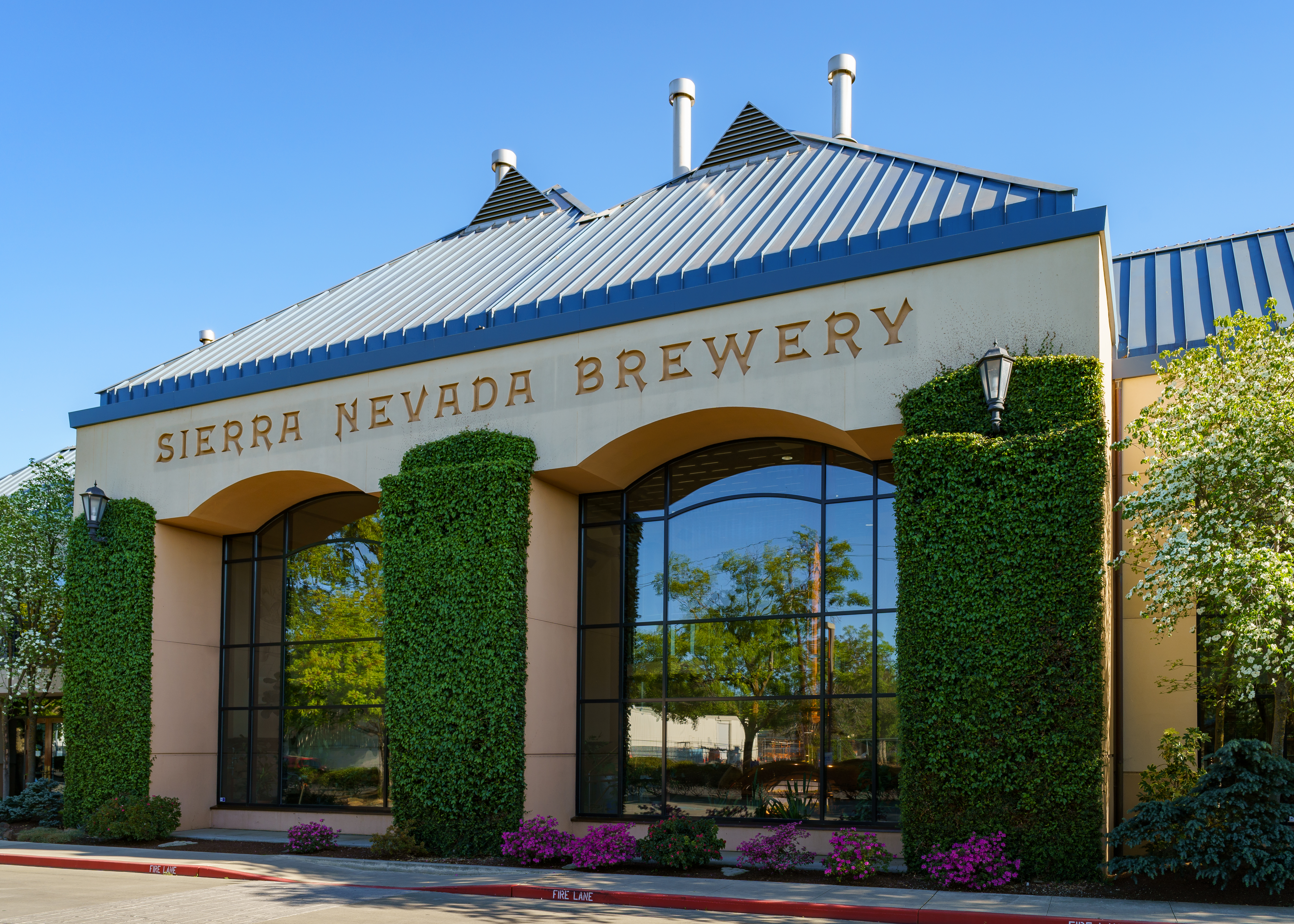
Sierra Nevada Brewing Company.

Almonds are the number one crop in Chico and the surrounding area, only recently edging out rice. Other crops in the area include walnuts, kiwis, olives, peaches, and plums.

The city is bounded on the west by orchards with thousands of almond trees, and there are still a few pockets of orchards remaining within the contiguous city limits. The trees bloom with a pink/white flower in late February or early March. Millions of bees are brought in for pollination.

Walnuts are also major agricultural products in the area north and west of town. Unlike the almond crops of the area, walnuts do not have the same appeal as they do not bloom in the spring. However, the trees themselves grow much larger, live longer, and are far more resilient to harsh weather than almond trees, which are known to be sensitive to frost and can be felled easily in winter storms. In the area, walnuts are harvested following the almond harvest season, beginning in mid to late September and stretching well into October. The walnut variety Chico is named after the city.

=== Top employers ===
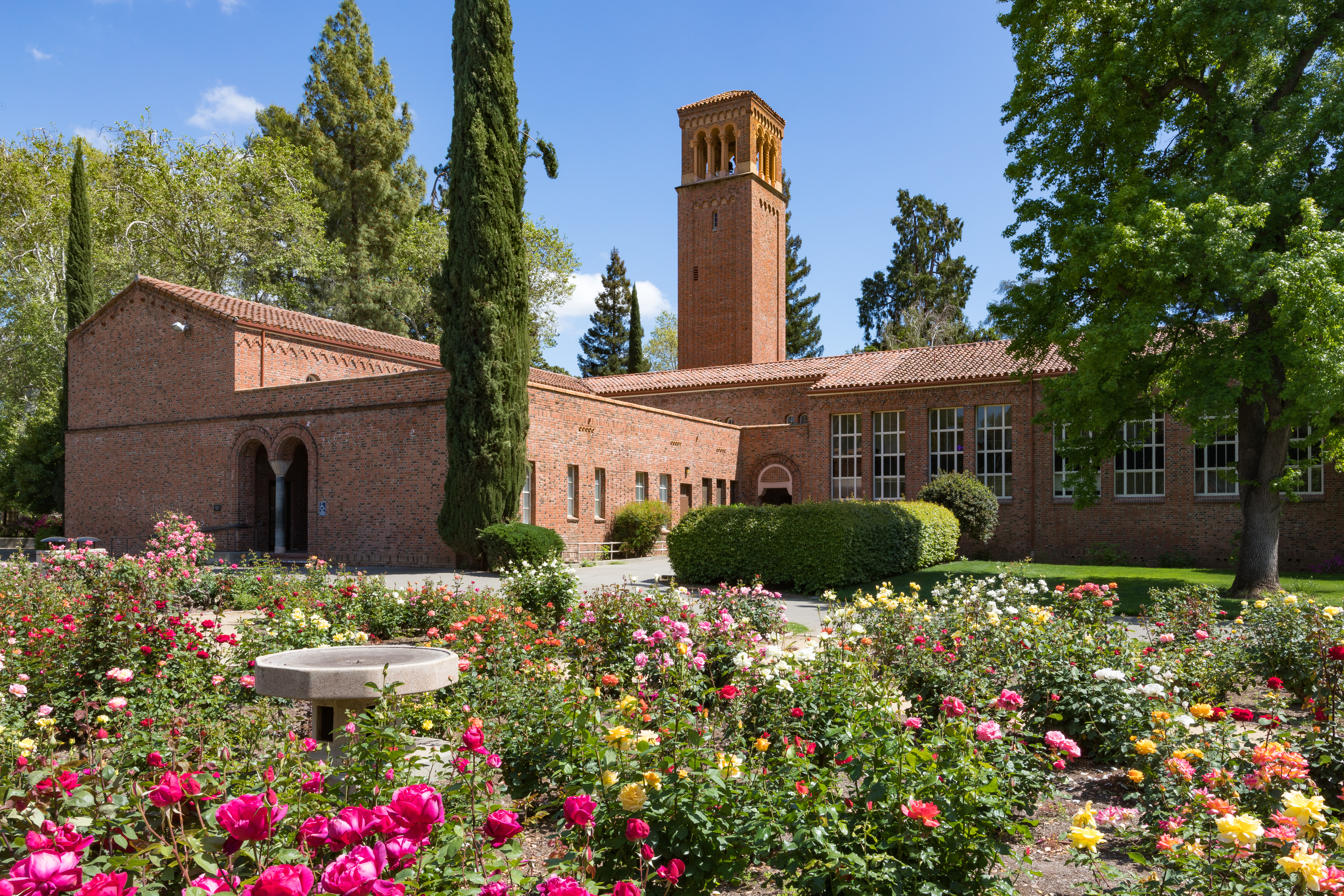
Trinity Hall at Chico State.

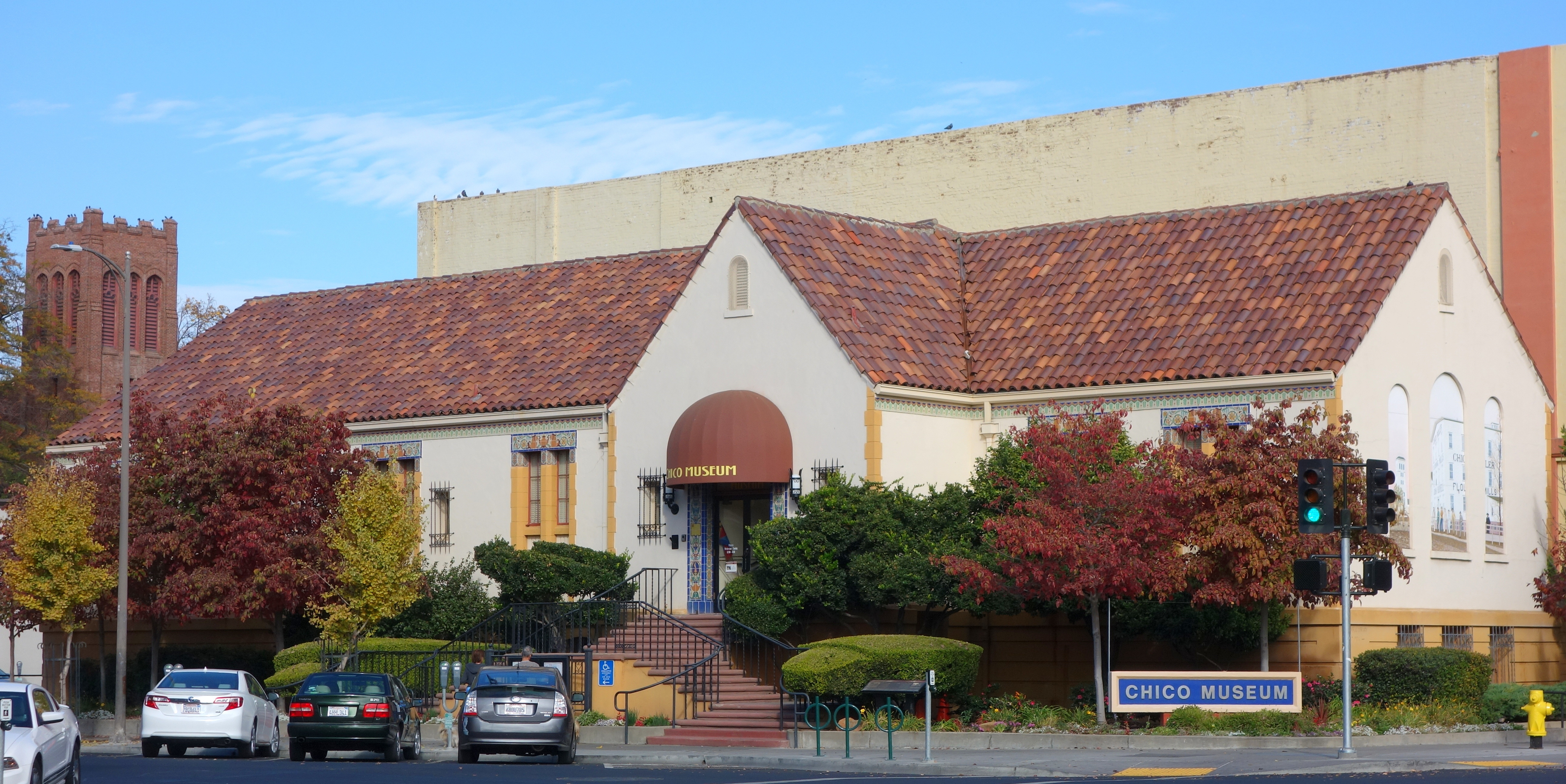
Chico Museum.

According to Zippia, the Top 10 employers in Chico are below.

#	Employer	# of Employees
1	California State University, Chico	2,000
2	Enloe Medical Center	2,000
3	Sierra Nevada Brewing Company	1,050
4	Tri Counties Bank	1,011
5	Victor	930
6	K*Coe Isom	420
7	Fifth Sun	240
8	Joy Signal Technology	175
9	Miller Buick Oldsmobile	175
10	The Terraces Retirement Community	175

== Arts and culture ==
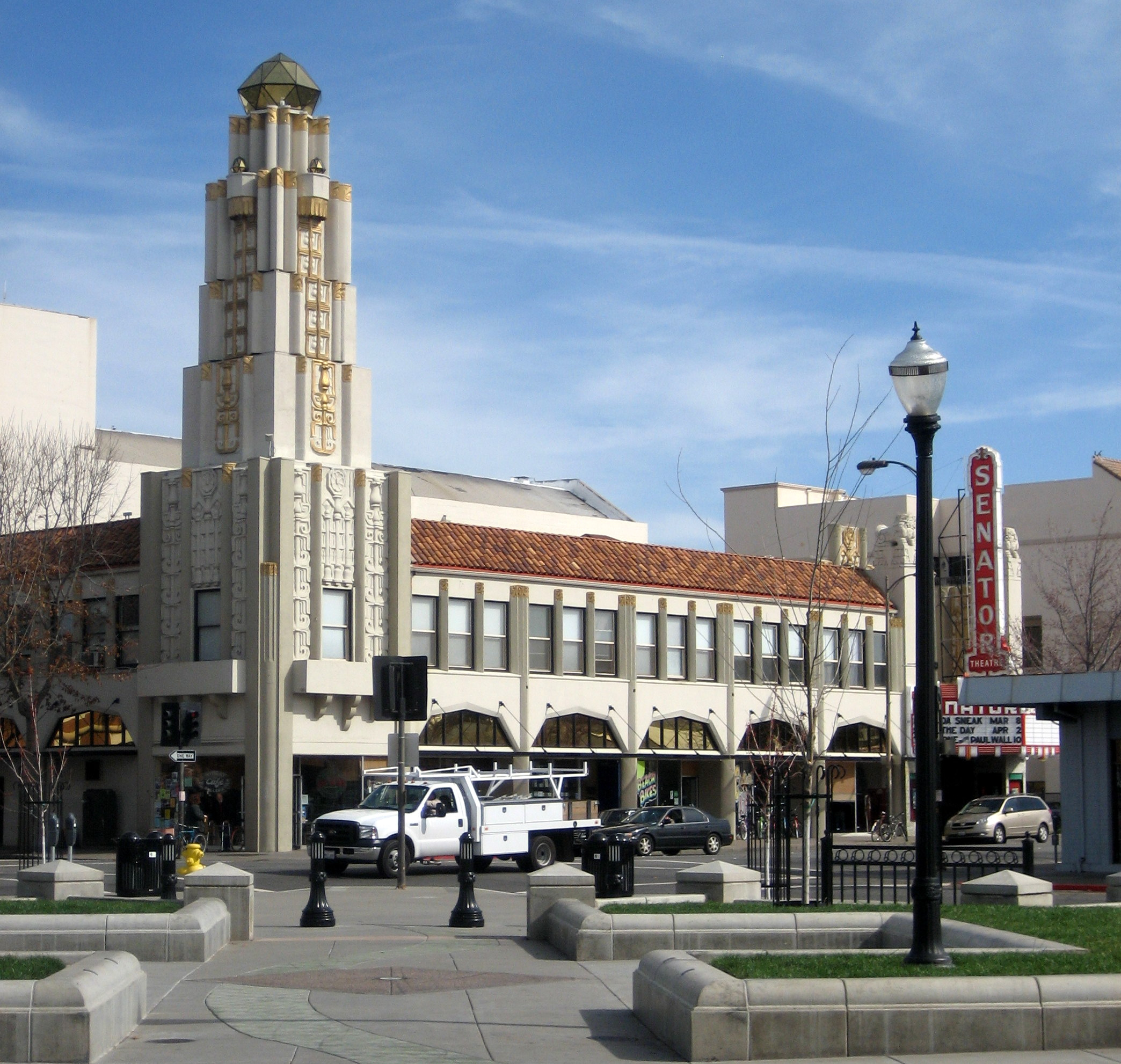
The Senator Theater, built in 1928 by architect Timothy L. Pflueger for Michael Naify and the Nesser Brothers

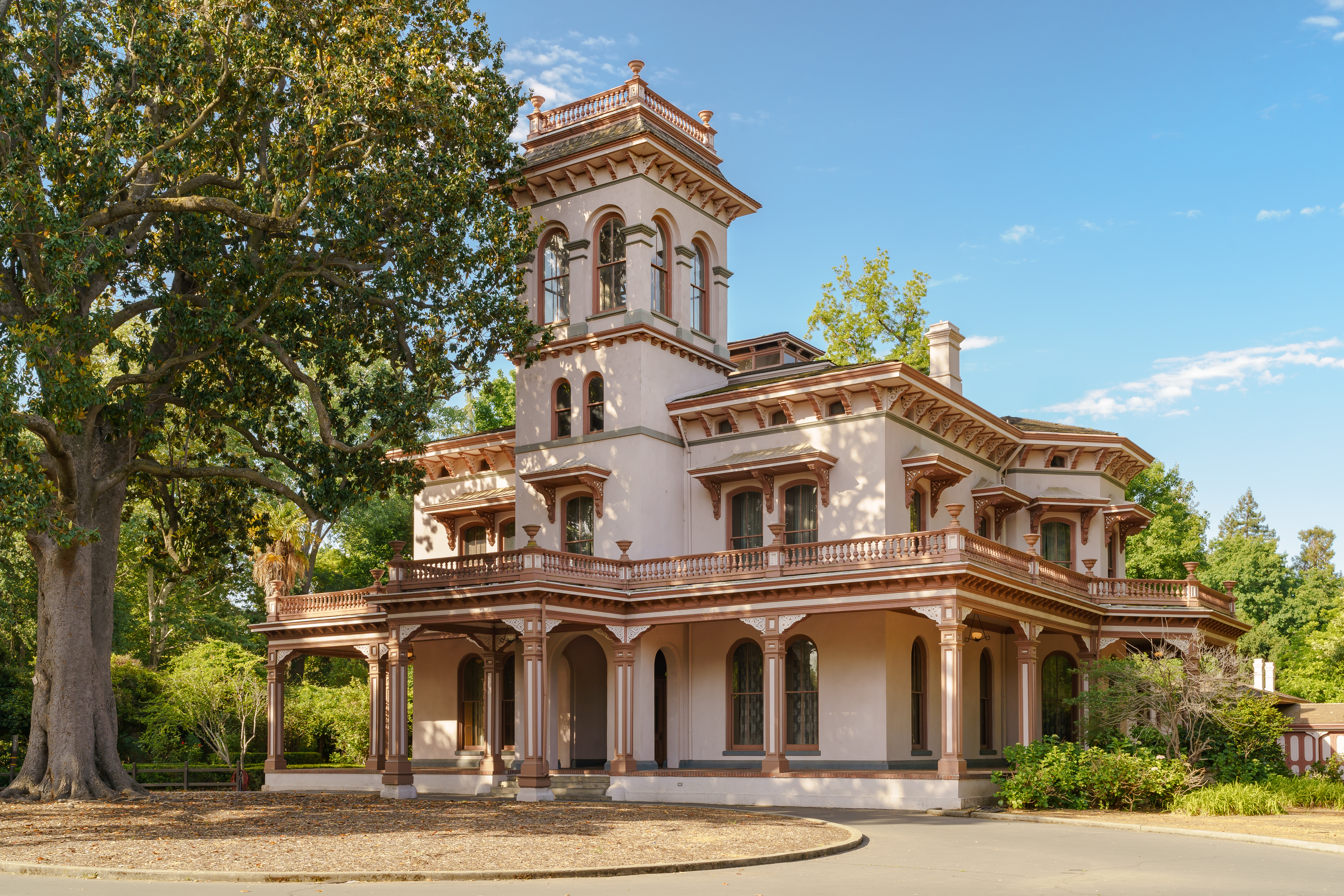
Bidwell Mansion State Historic Park

The Chico Museum first opened in February 1986 in the former Carnegie Library building in downtown Chico. It currently features a World War I exhibit. The museum has two main galleries, which host a variety of temporary and traveling exhibits. In addition, the museum has two smaller, permanent galleries displaying the diverse history of Chico.

The Chico Air Museum is an aviation museum, which opened in 2004. Several aircraft and exhibits are displayed in and adjacent to an old hangar, one of the few remaining from World War II.

The National Yo-Yo Museum is the country's largest collection of yo-yo artifacts, which also includes a 4-foot (1.2 m) tall yo-yo that is dropped with a crane every few years, the world's largest functional yo-yo. Classes are available as well for those new to yo-yo and those who just want to get better. An art museum, the Chico Art Center, is also located in the city. Two other historical buildings are also museums. Bidwell Mansion was a Victorian house completed in 1868 and the former home of John and Annie Bidwell. Bidwell Mansion is a California State Historical Park. On December 11, 2024, the building was destroyed by arson. Stansbury House, former home of physician Oscar Stansbury, is a museum of 19th-century life, completed in 1883.

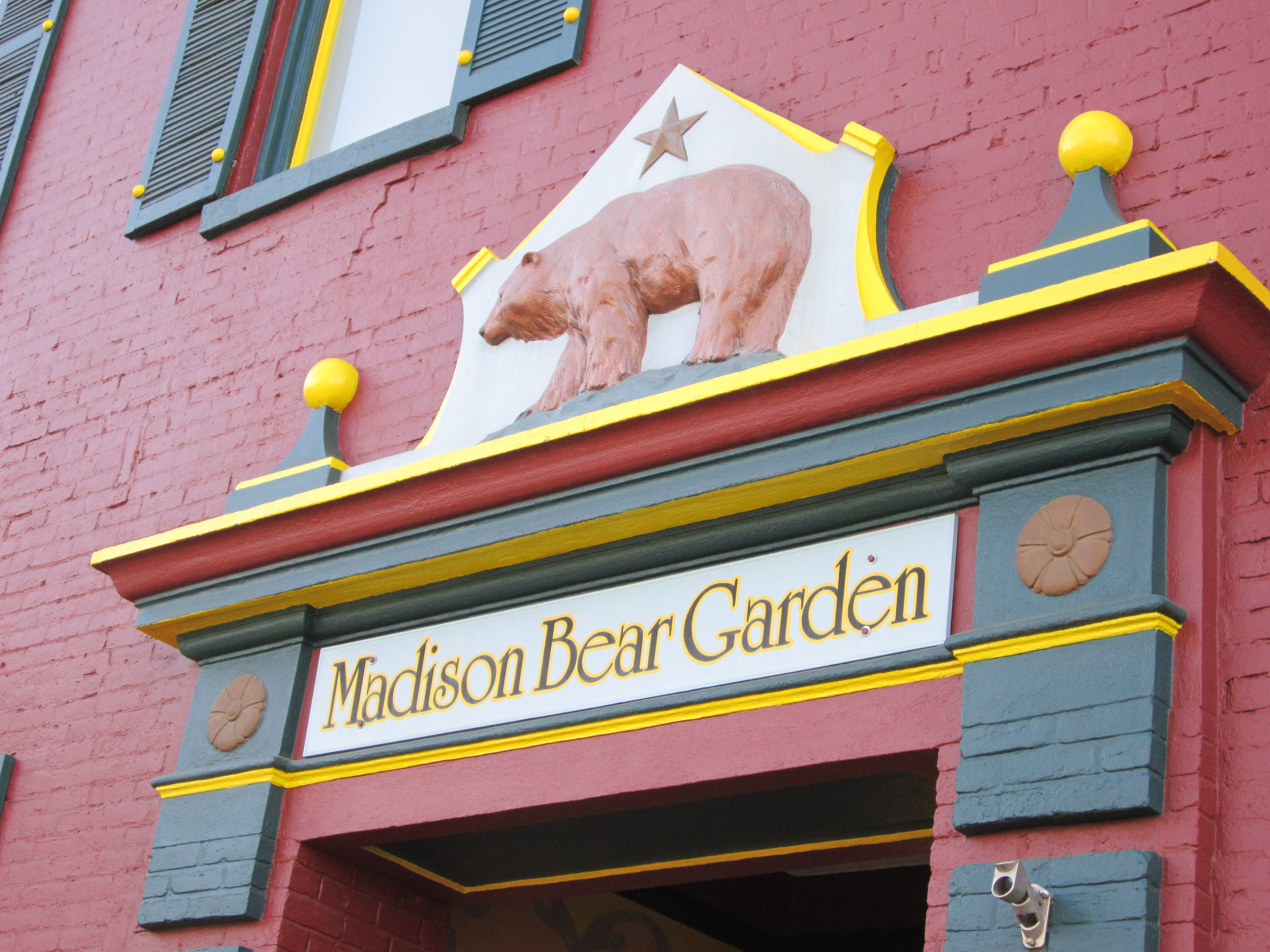
Symbols of the Californian Bear flag at the historic Madison Bear Garden

The Valene L. Smith Museum of Anthropology on the Chico State campus presents temporary exhibits researched, designed, and installed primarily by students. The museum was renamed November 18, 2009, by the Chico State Board of Trustees in honor of professor emerita Valene L. Smith, whose contributions and commitments to the museum have totaled over $4.6 million. The grand opening was held on January 28, 2010. The museum is across from the main entrance of the Miriam Library, next to the Janet Turner Print Museum.

The Gateway Science Museum is a leading center for science education and Northern California's local history, natural resources, seacoast, Sacramento Valley, and surrounding foothills and mountains.

Chico is home to the Chico Certified Farmers Market; they host local farmers markets every Wednesday, Saturday and Sunday. Residents are also able to enjoy a farmers and live market downtown on Thursday nights between April and September.

About 40 murals and several galleries can be found in the city, including Chico Paper Company, 1078 Gallery, Avenue 9, The Space, 24-Hour Drive-By, and numerous other galleries. The theatres in Chico include Blue Room Theatre, Chico Performances, Chico Theater Company, and California Regional Theatre. The California State University, Chico Theatre Department also offers a variety of entertainment throughout the school year.

== Sports ==
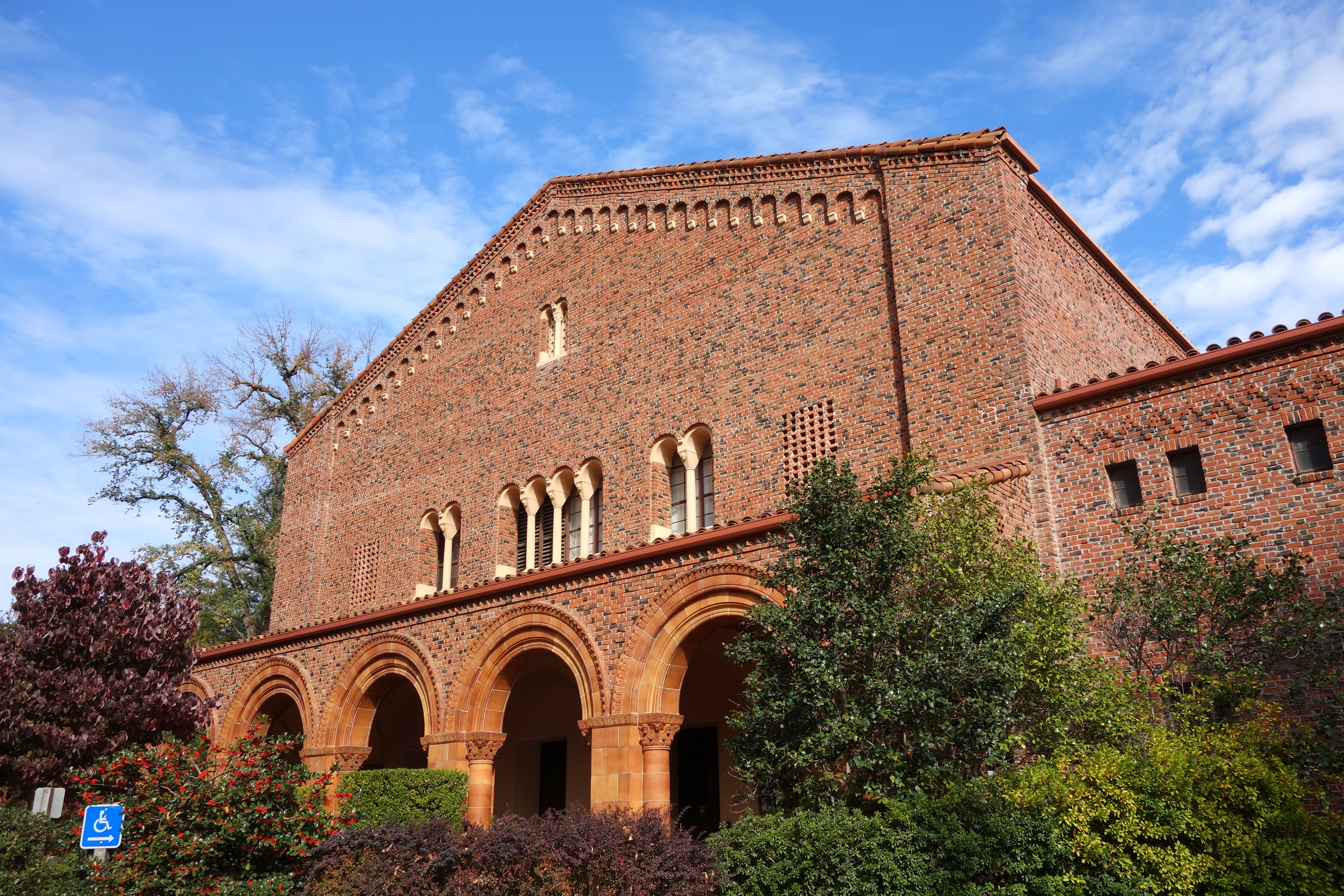
Laxson Auditorium at California State University, Chico.

Chico is home to Nettleton Stadium (also called The Net) baseball stadium on the California State University campus. It is the home field for the Chico State Wildcats baseball team, in NCAA Division 2.

Chico is also home to the Silver Dollar Speedway, a race track at the Silver Dollar Fairgrounds used for sprint car racing.

Chico is one of few cities to be home to two championship baseball teams in two different leagues simultaneously. The Chico State Wildcats were champions in both the 1997 and 1999 Division II College World Series. The Chico Heat were also champions in the Western Baseball League in 1997. The Chico Outlaws were founded with the Golden Baseball League in 2005, where they also won the championship in 2007 and 2010. Starting in the summer of 2016, the Chico Heat returned as a part of the Great West League, a collegiate summer wood-bat league, until 2018 when the league folded due to financial issues from several other participating teams.

Chico has also gained a reputation as being a bicycle-friendly city. Chico hosts the Wildflower Century, an annual 100-mile (160 km) bike ride throughout Butte County every April, put on by Chico Velo Cycling Club. The city is in the process of creating a network of bicycle paths, trails, and lanes.

Chico is the former home of the Chico Rooks (soccer), the Chico Heat (baseball – Western Baseball League), and Chico Outlaws (baseball – Golden Baseball League).

== Government ==
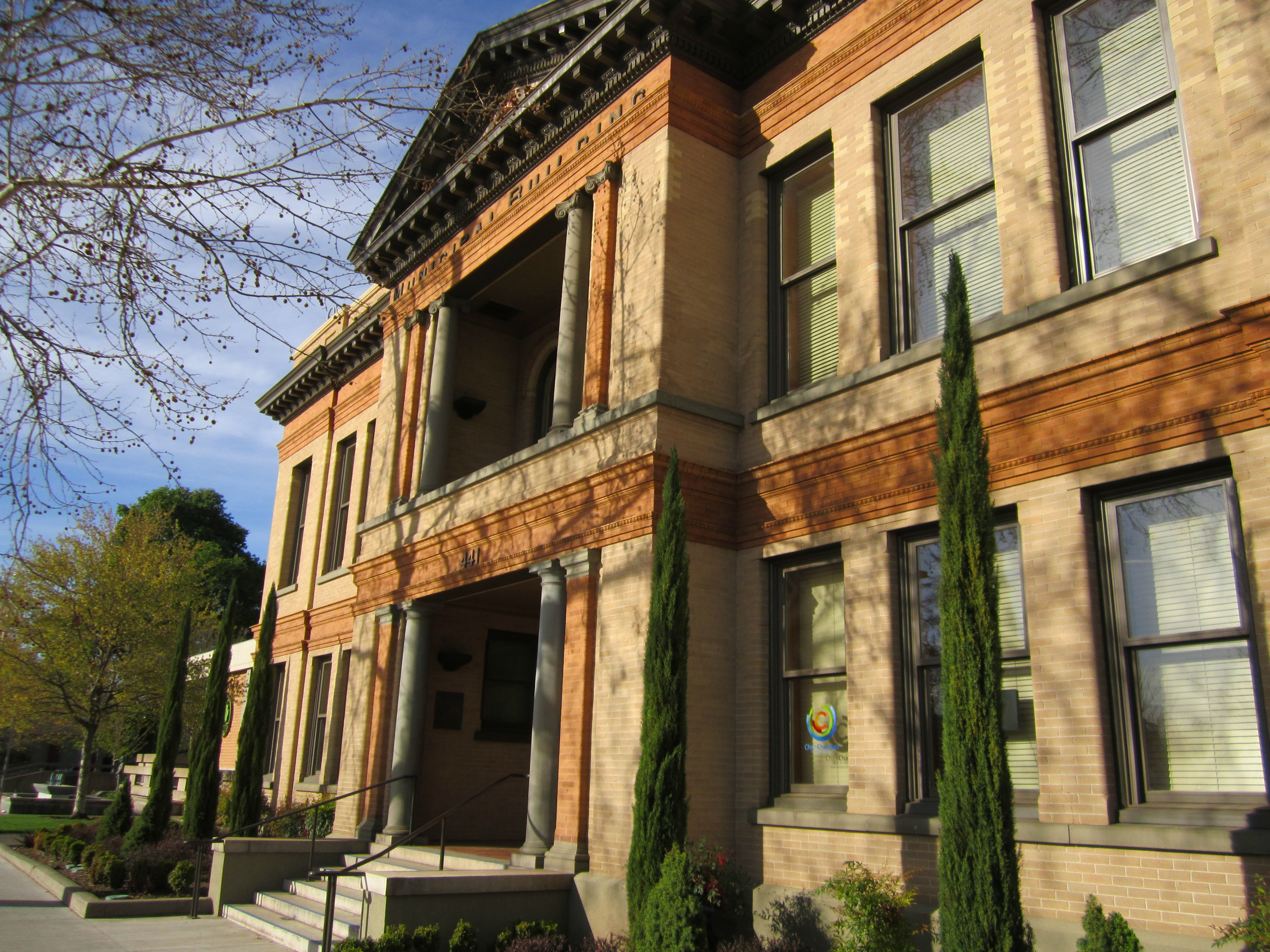
Chico's Old Municipal Building.

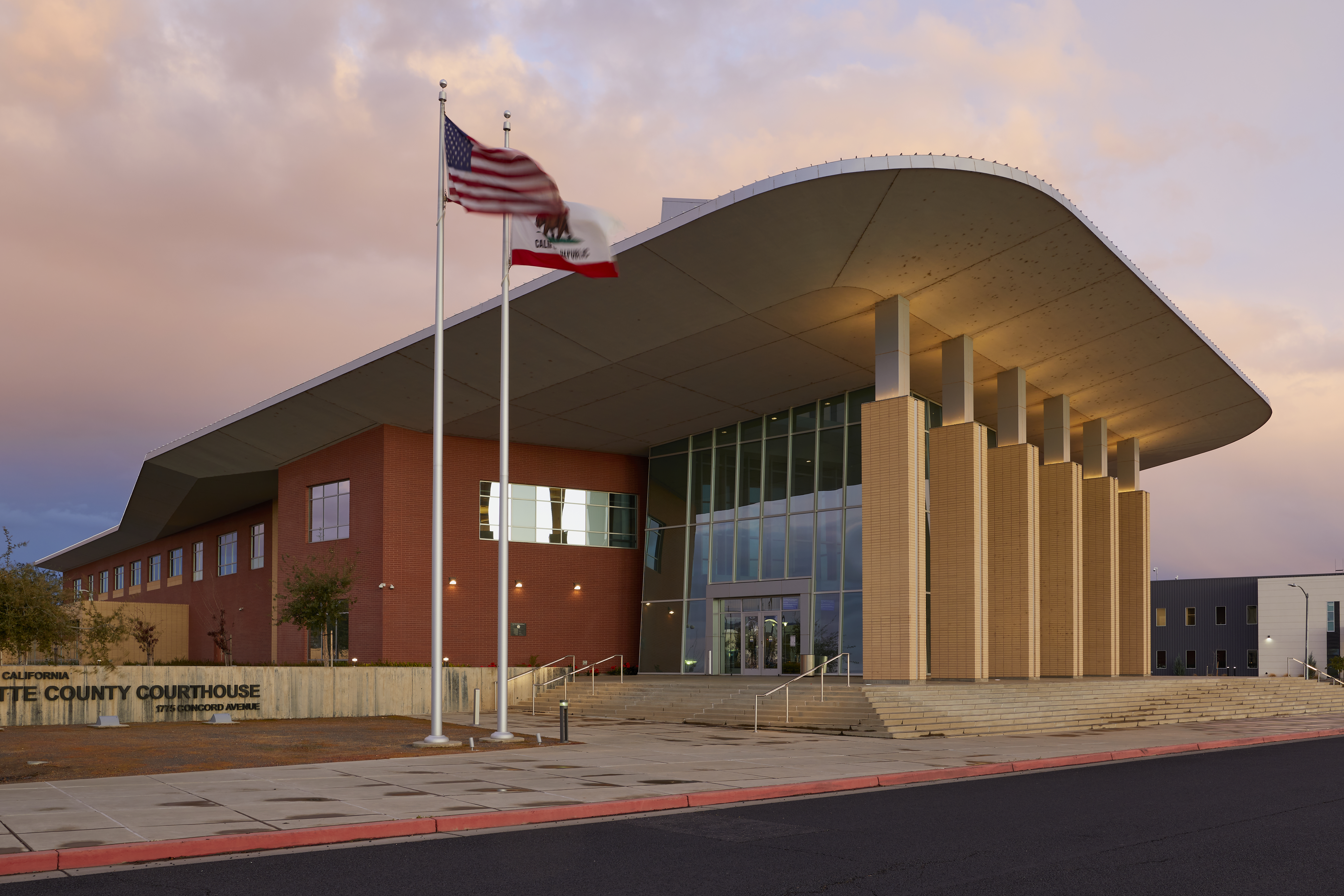
Butte County Superior Court.

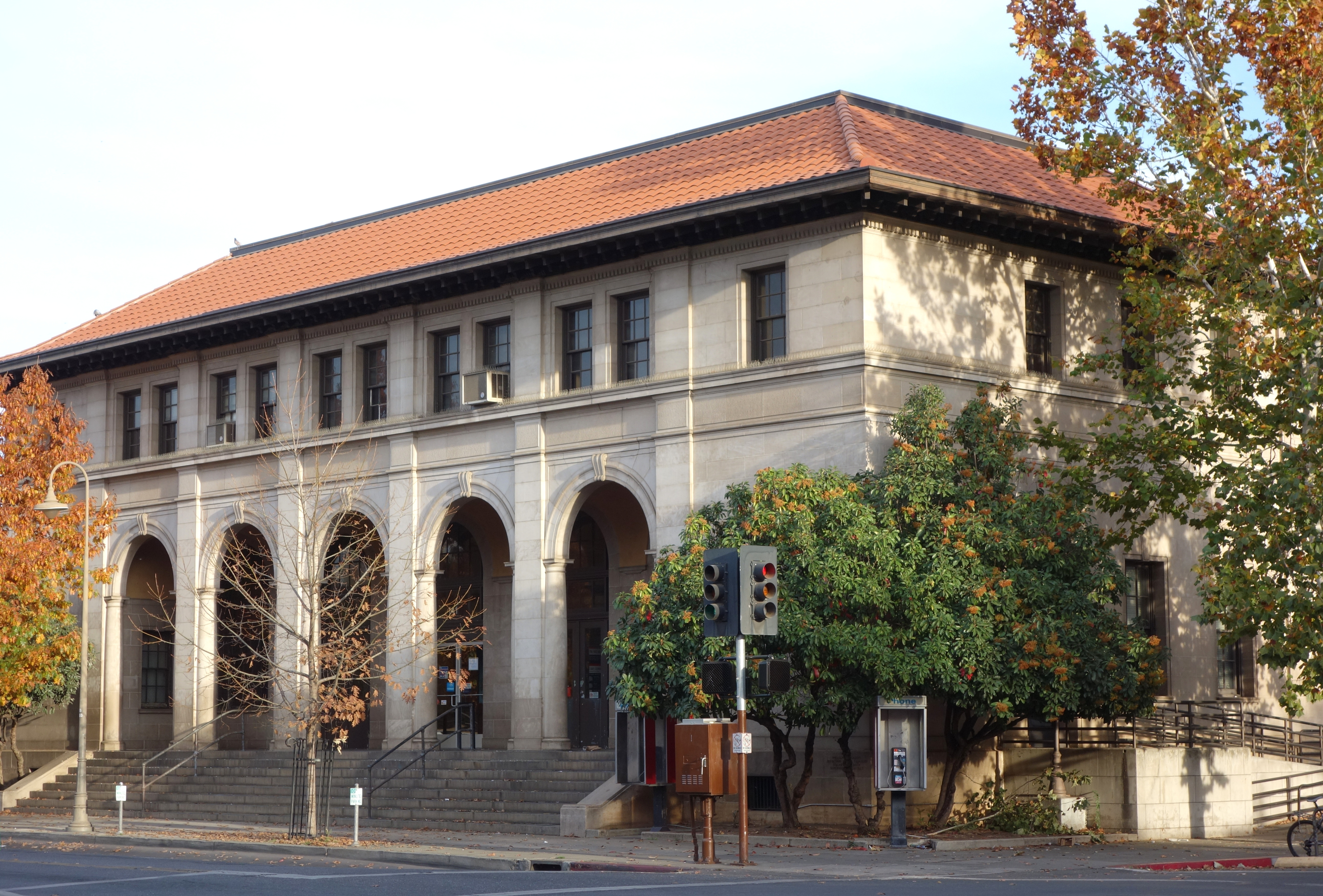
Chico Midtown Station.

The City of Chico is a charter city and has a council–manager government. The City of Chico's administration offices are located at 411 Main Street, immediately adjacent to the City Council Chambers. Chico's city council consists of seven nonpartisan council members each elected from one of the seven districts in November of even-numbered years. The districts were officially created in February 2020.

Their terms begin on the first Tuesday in December and end on the first Tuesday in December four years thereafter. The mayor is chosen by and from among the council members and serves for two years. City council meetings are on the first and third Tuesday of each month.

As of 2025, the council consists of Mayor Kasey Reynolds, Vice Mayor Dale Bennett, Bryce Goldstein, Katie Hawley, Mike O'Brien, Tom van Overbeek, and Addison Winslow.

Chico is represented in the Butte County Board of Supervisors by the District Two Supervisor Peter Durfee, District Three Supervisor Tami Ritter, District 4 Supervisor Tod Kimmelshue and District 5 Supervisor Doug Teeter.

The citizens of Chico, as constituents of California's 3rd Assembly District, are represented by Vacant in the California State Assembly, and as members of California's 1st Senate District, are represented by Republican Megan Dahle in the California State Senate. As part of California's 1st congressional district, Chico is represented by James Gallagher (R–Yuba City) in the United States House of Representatives.

Chico was designated to be the provisional capital of California if a disaster occurred that would cause evacuation of Sacramento after a civil defense exercise named Operation Chico was deemed a success. No person shall produce, test, maintain, or store within the city a nuclear weapon, component of a nuclear weapon, nuclear weapon delivery system, or component of a nuclear weapon delivery system under penalty of Chapter 9.60.030 of the Chico Municipal Code.

== Education ==
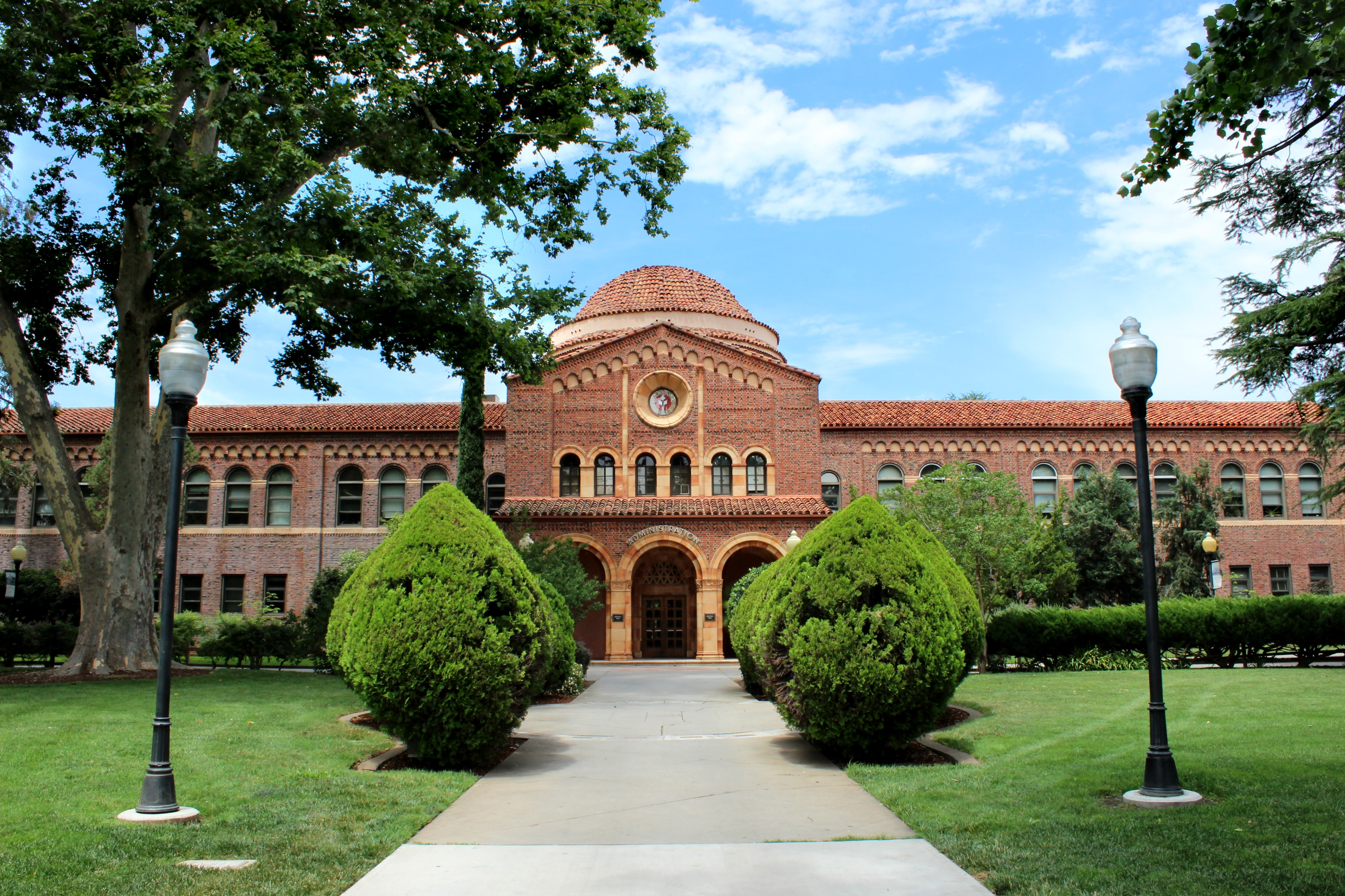
Kendall Hall at Chico State.

The Chico Unified School District serves all of the greater Chico area, including areas not within the city limits. Public high schools include Chico High School, Pleasant Valley High School and Inspire School of Arts and Sciences.

In 1998, city voters approved a bond to build a third comprehensive high school that was to be called Canyon View High School. However, after a long search for a suitable site, the school district opted not to build the new high school, a decision based largely on declining enrollment figures. The money from the bond has now been used to improve the Chico and Pleasant Valley high schools.

Higher Education:

- California State University, Chico (Chico State)
- Butte College
- Cal Northern School of Law

== Media ==
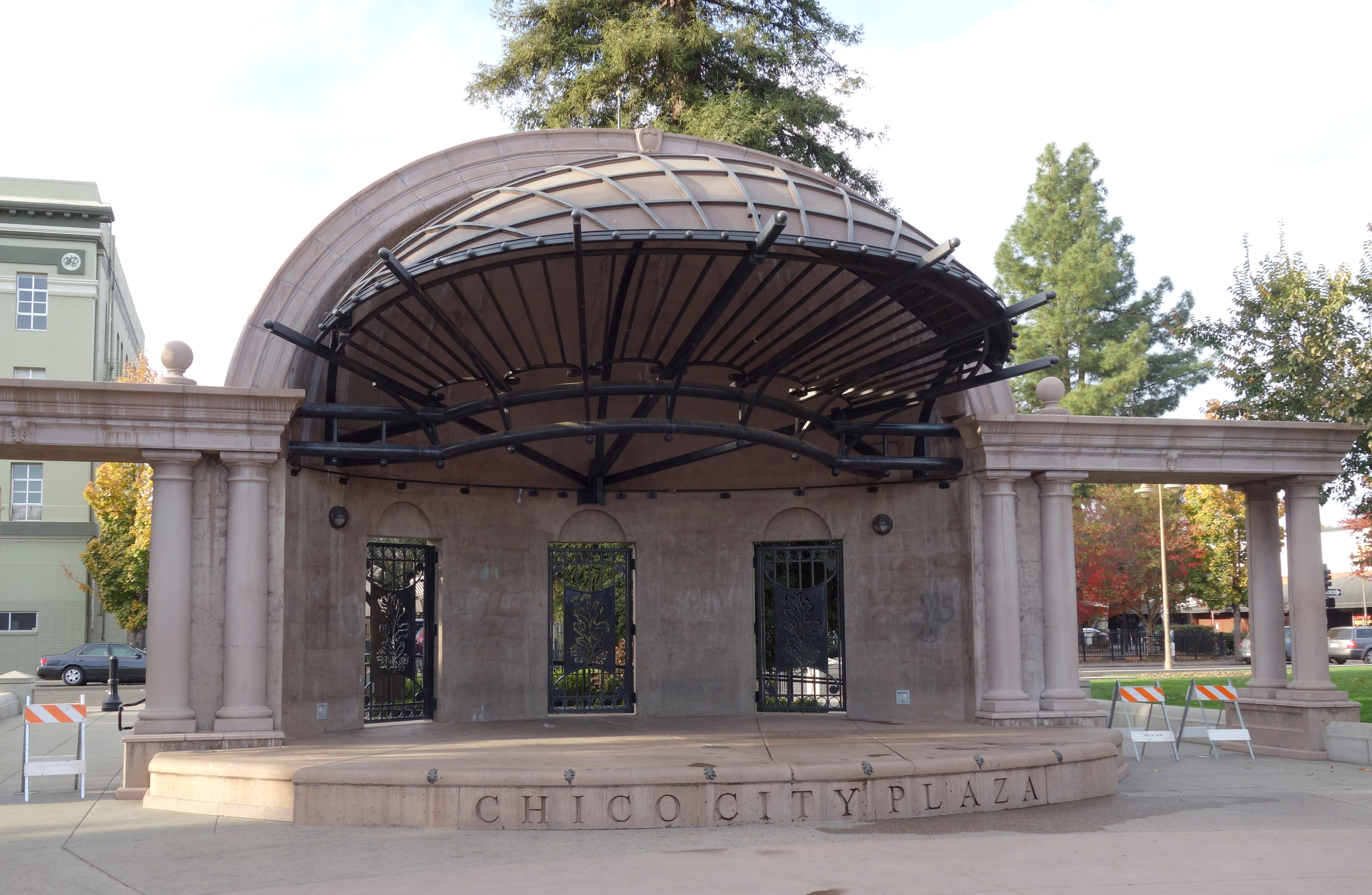
The public stage at Chico Plaza.

Chico is served by several print newspapers, including the Chico Enterprise-Record, the Chico News & Review, The Orion, and by Videomaker Magazine.

Local television stations include KCVU-TV (Roar), KHSL-TV (CBS/CW+), KIXE-TV (PBS), KNVN-TV (NBC/Telemundo), and KRCR-TV (ABC/Fox).

Local FM radio stations include: KALF (FM) 95.7, KBQB (FM) 92.7, KCEZ (FM) 102.1, KCHO (FM) 91.7, KPAY-FM 93.9, KHHZ (FM) 97.7, KHSL-FM 103.5, KMXI (FM) 95.1, KRQR (FM), 106.7, KTHU (FM) 100.7, KZAP (FM) 96.7, KZFR (FM) 90.1.

Local AM stations include KPAY 1290 and KZSZ 107.5.

== Infrastructure ==
=== Transportation ===
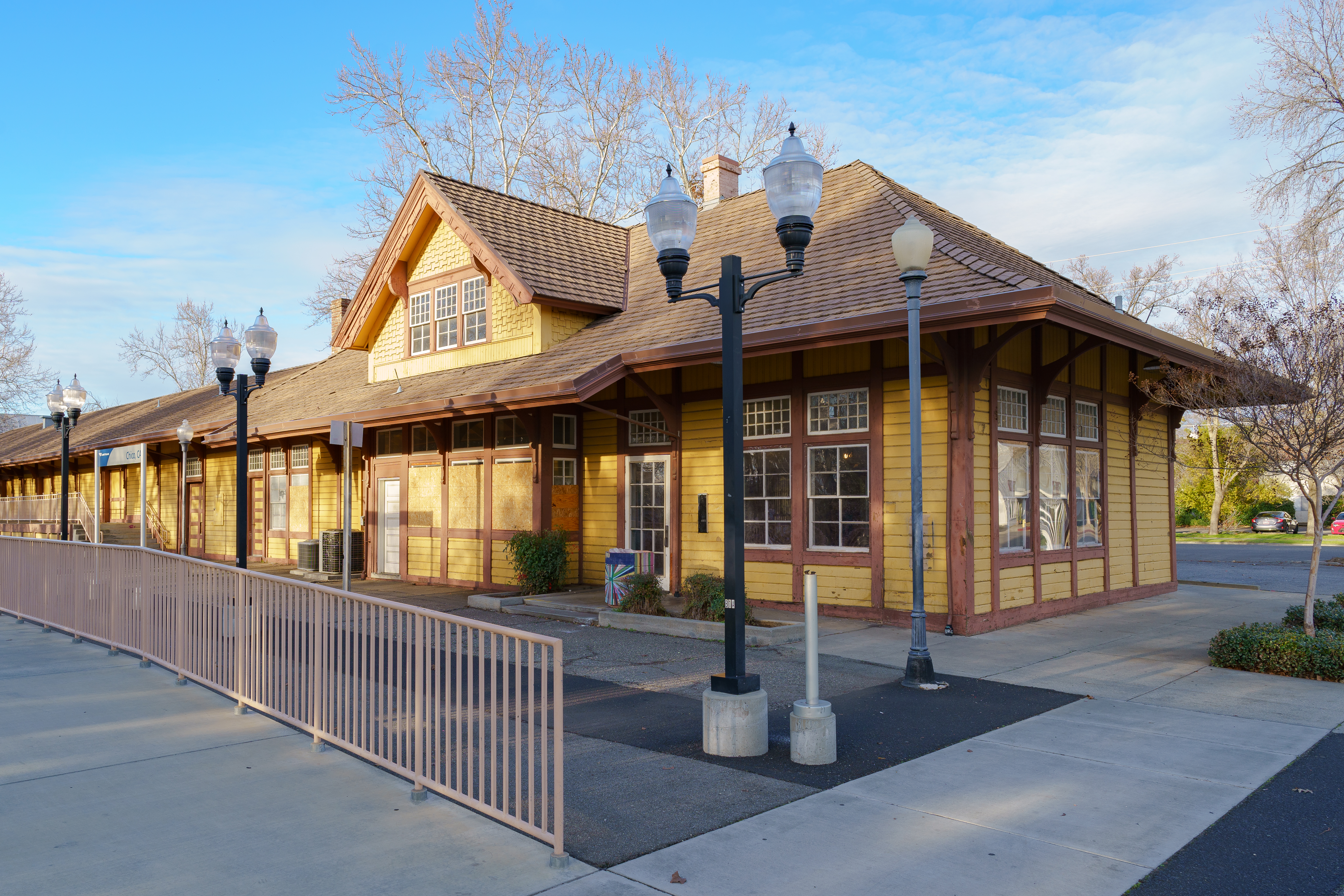
Chico station is served by Amtrak.

Amtrak operates the Chico station at Fifth and Orange Streets for the Coast Starlight service. The terminal is partially wheelchair accessible, has an enclosed waiting area, public restrooms, public payphones, free short-term and long-term parking. Trains run between Seattle and Los Angeles with a northbound and a southbound train departing from the station daily. The Greyhound and FlixBus station is also located at Fifth and Orange Streets.

The B-Line (Butte Regional Transit) serves the Chico Urban area with eight routes operating Monday through Saturday and two shuttle routes for Chico State students during the academic year.

Chico is a gold level bicycle-friendly community as designated by the League of American Bicyclists.

Pedicabs are commonly available downtown during the evenings.

California State Route 99 and California State Route 32 intersect in Chico.

=== Air ===
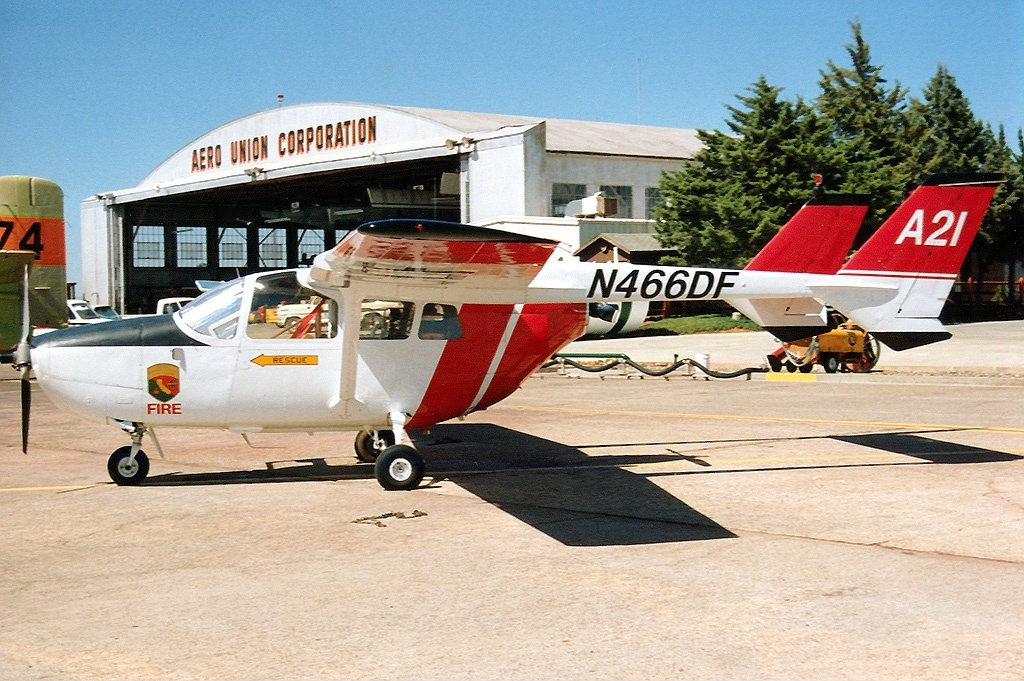
Plane at Chico Municipal Airport

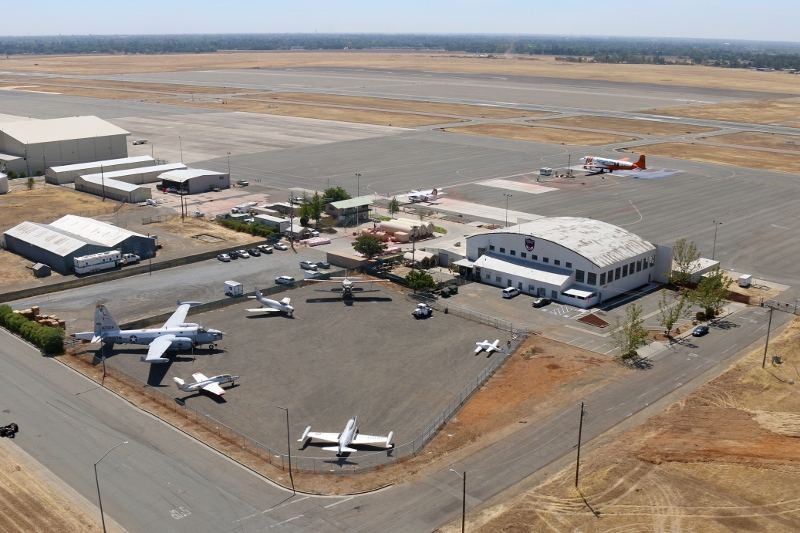
Chico Air Museum

Chico Regional Airport serves the area and is north of the city limits. It was served by United Airlines' United Express flights operated by SkyWest Airlines nonstop to San Francisco (SFO). Commercial passenger flights were discontinued by SkyWest on December 2, 2014, due to nonviability, as indicated by United Airlines in June 2014. The city administration is trying to restore air service, which would be provided by alternate airlines. On July 31, 1961, the first-ever aircraft hijacking on United States soil occurred at the Chico Regional Airport. Two men were critically wounded, and the hijacker was sentenced to more than 30 years in prison.

In the early 1980s, the airport was the home base and headquarters for Pacific Express, a scheduled passenger airline that served Chico with British Aircraft Corporation BAC One-Eleven twin jets. From 1962 to 2010, the airport was also home to Aero Union, a company that refitted and operated surplus military aircraft such as the Lockheed P-3 Orion turboprop as fire fighting aircraft for state and federal agencies until their move to McClellan Airfield, near Sacramento.

Another local airfield is Ranchaero Airport, surrounded by orchards on the west edge of Chico.

An altitude record for unmanned gas balloons was set in Chico in October 1972 (51.8 km or 32.2 mi). The record was broken on May 23, 2002.

Top Gun: Maverick was filmed in the foothills outside Chico in July 2019 for the final scenes between the F-14 and two SU-57's, which was performed using two L-39's and CGI. The film crew spent 10 days filming and secretly used the Chico Airport for a staging area. Geographic identifiers in the film include the Feather River Canyon, Bucks Lake, Feather Falls and Mount Lassen.

== Notable people ==
- Emily Azevedo, Olympian, world champion in bobsled
- Annie Bidwell, civil rights leader
- John Bidwell, pioneer and founder of Chico
- Big Poppa E, slam poet
- Joseph Bottom, swimmer, Olympic silver medalist, NCAA and world champion
- Lisa Butts, national team player, women's rugby
- Brian Cage, professional wrestler
- Glynnis Talken Campbell, author, composer, musician, and voice actor.
- Bill Carter, documentary filmmaker, author
- Raymond Carver, writer
- Eugene A. Chappie, politician
- Pat Clements, professional baseball pitcher
- Edwin Copeland, botanist, founder University of the Philippines Los Banos College of Agriculture
- Clay Dalrymple, professional baseball catcher
- Leslie Deniz, Olympic silver medalist in discus
- Amanda Detmer, actress
- Newton T. Enloe, founder of Enloe Health medical system
- Ashley Everett, dancer, lead backup dancer, and dance captain for Beyoncé
- Pat Gillick, executive in Baseball Hall of Fame
- Ken Grossman, founder, Sierra Nevada Brewing Company
- Jerry Harris, sculptor
- Russell Hayden, actor
- Joseph Hilbe, Chico State University graduate, author, professor, statistician
- Marty James, musician
- Mat Kearney, musician
- Adnan Khashoggi, billionaire businessman
- Kurt Kitayama, professional golfer
- Janja Lalich, author, professor, sociologist
- Harold Lang, dancer and actor
- Major Ted W. Lawson, U.S. Army Air Forces pilot
- Kyle Lohse, MLB pitcher, 2011 World Series champion
- Pat Mastelotto, musician
- Michael Messner, notable author, sociologist
- William Morris, glass artist
- The Mother Hips, musical artists
- Joe Nelson, professional baseball player
- Matt Olmstead, writer and producer
- Elena Orlando, professional ice hockey player
- Andranik Ozanian, Armenian general and activist
- Pete Parada, professional musician, drummer for The Offspring
- Kathleen Patterson, politician
- Michael Perelman, author, economist, professor
- Jackson Pollock, abstract expressionist painter
- Jonathan Richman, Singer, songwriter and former frontman of the Modern Lovers
- Aaron Rodgers, quarterback, Super Bowl champion and four-time NFL MVP
- Jordan Rodgers, SEC Network sportscaster
- Ed Rollins, political consultant
- Jason Ross, TV writer
- Rigoberto Sanchez, professional football punter
- Mike Sherrard, professional football player, Super Bowl XXIV champion
- Carolyn S. Shoemaker, astronomer
- Robert C. Stebbins, herpetologist and illustrator
- Gentry Stein, world yo-yo champion and performer
- Jeff Stover, professional football player
- Mike Thompson, politician
- Douglas Tilden, sculptor
- Niki Tsongas, politician, widow of Paul Tsongas
- Muddy Waters, coach in College Football Hall of Fame
- Bill Wattenburg, scientist, radio talk show host
- Don Young, politician

== Sister cities ==
- – Tamsui, New Taipei, Taiwan 1985
- (United States) – Pascagoula, Mississippi (U.S.) 2005

== See also ==
- College town
