= KPAY (AM) =

Radio station in Chico, California

Coordinates: 39°42′37.6″N 121°47′19.9″W

- Chico, California; United States
- Frequency: 1290 kHz
- Branding: KPAY Sports 1290

Programming
- Format: Sports
- Affiliations: Fox Sports Radio

Ownership
- Owner: Deer Creek Broadcasting, LLC
- Sister stations: KHHZ; KHSL-FM; KMXI; KPAY-FM

History
- First air date: 1935
- Former call signs: KHSL (1935–1997)

Technical information
- Licensing authority: FCC
- Facility ID: 22975
- Class: B
- Power: 5,000 watts
- Translator: 102.9 K275CO (Paradise)

Links
- Public license information: Public file; LMS
- Webcast: Listen live
- Website: www.kpaysports.com

KPAY (1290 AM) is a sports formatted radio station in Northern California. The station can be heard in Butte County, California, and parts of Tehama County, Glenn County, and Colusa County. The station's transmitter power is 5,000 watts and is located in Chico, California. The station is owned by Deer Creek Broadcasting, LLC. KPAY is a radio affiliate of Fox Sports Radio, also covering north valley sports, including Chico State Wildcats Athletics (baseball, basketball), the NFL, MLB, Golden State Warriors, Oakland Athletics and Butte College Football.

== History ==
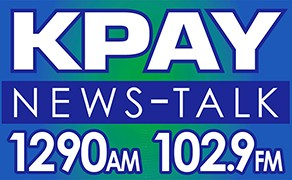
KPAY's logo under previous news/talk format

In October 1949, KXOC began broadcasting. In February 1953, KXOC changed its call sign to KPAY. In July 1994, the KPAY building was destroyed by fire. The station was originally located on 1060 kHz, but in 1997 moved to 1290 kHz, which had been vacated by KHSL after that station's format moved to KHSL-FM 103.5 as "The Blaze". In July 2019, Portland, Oregon-based Bustos Media was involved in a multi-station trade. KPAY was transitioned from news talk radio to sports provided by Fox Sports Radio. The news and talk format was moved to KPAY-FM 93.9.

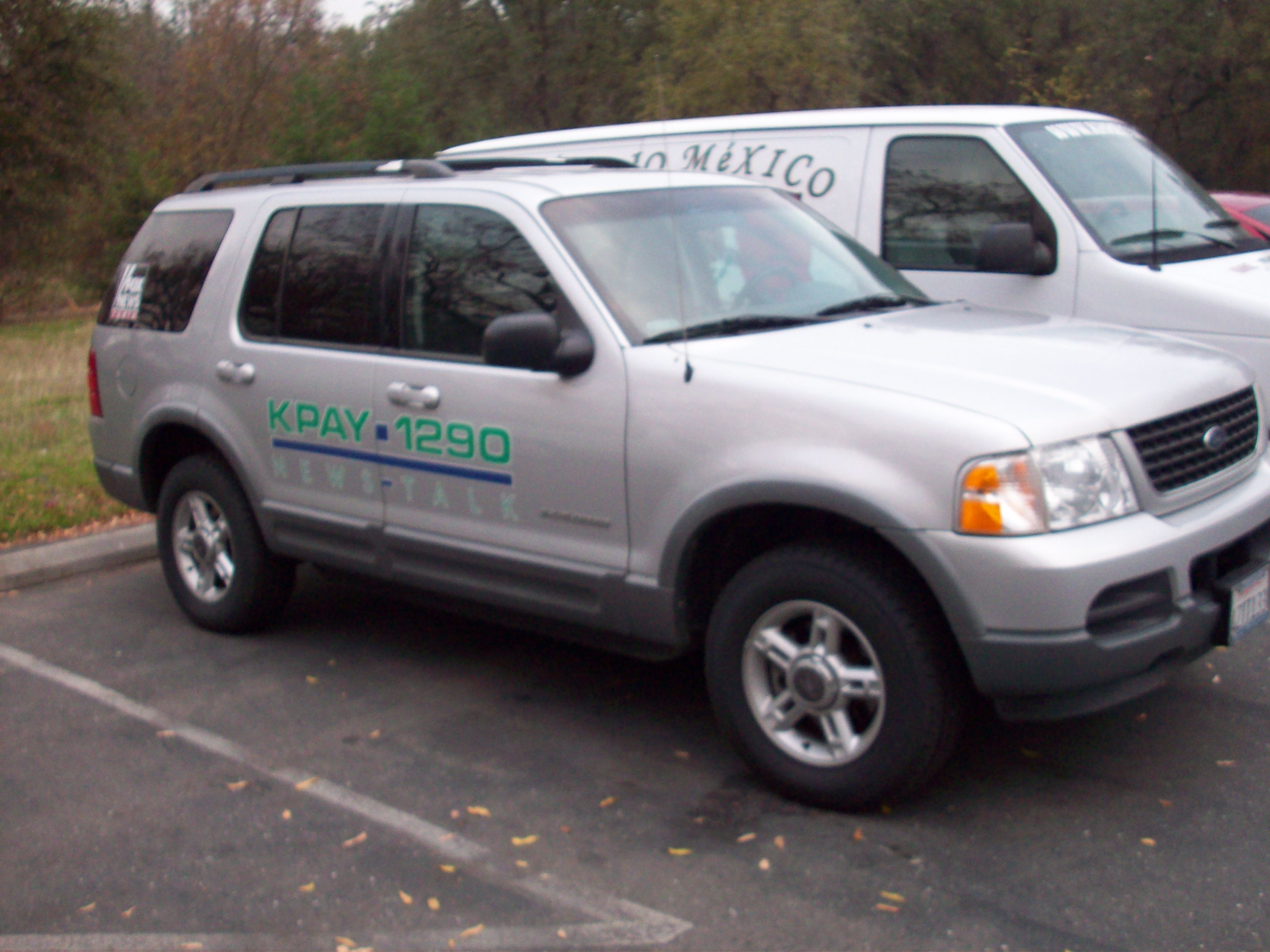
KPAY station vehicle

== Notable personalities and shows ==
- Dan Patrick
- Colin Cowherd
- Doug Gottlieb
- Damon Amendolara

== See also ==
- KHSL-FM
