= Big Chico Creek =

Chico Creek
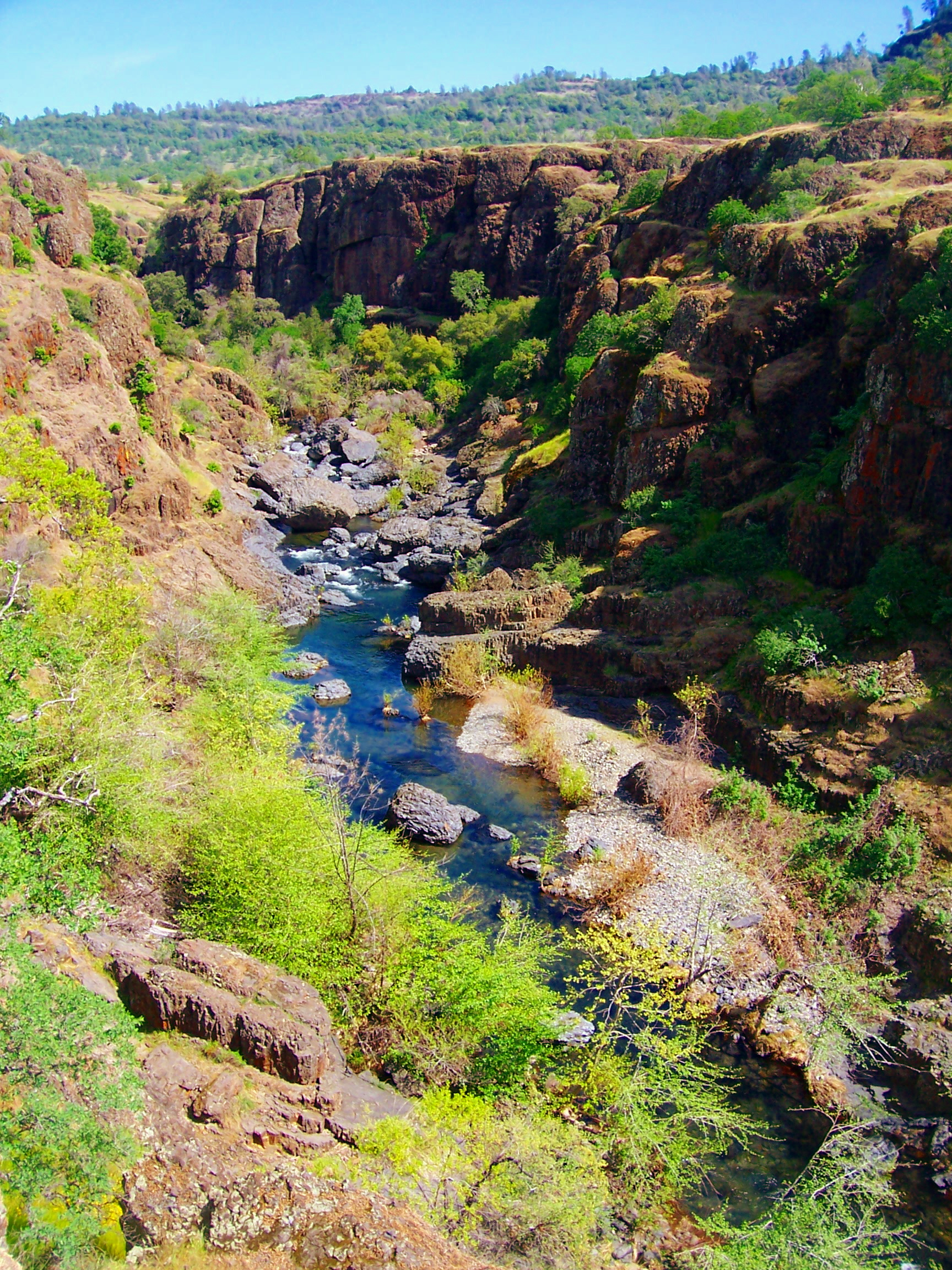
- Big Chico Creek in Upper Bidwell Park

Location
- Country: United States
- State: California
- Region: Butte County, Tehama County
- Cities: Chico

Physical characteristics
- Source
  - location: Near Colby Mountain, in Lassen National Park
  - coordinates: 40°07′25″N 121°30′32″W
  - elevation: 5,000 ft (1,500 m)
- Mouth
  - location: Confluence with Sacramento River, in the Sacramento Valley
  - coordinates: 39°41′48″N 121°56′29″W
  - elevation: 120 ft (37 m)
- Length: 46 mi (74 km)

Basin features
- River system: Sacramento River Basin
- Tributaries
  - left: Little Chico Creek

Big Chico Creek is a creek in northeastern California that originates near Colby Mountain in Lassen National Park. It flows 46 miles (74 km) to its confluence with the Sacramento River in Butte County. The creek's elevation declines from 5,000 feet (1,500 m) above sea level at its head to 120 feet (37 m) where it joins the Sacramento River, as shown on the Ord Ferry USGS quadrangle. Big Chico Creek forms part of the demarcation between the Sierra Nevada and the Cascade Range.

A portion of Big Chico Creek flows through the city of Chico's Bidwell Park and California State University, Chico.

== Natural history ==
There are numerous plant and animal species in the riparian zone and entire watershed of Big Chico Creek. A threatened species of Chinook Salmon make annual spawning runs up Big Chico Creek to the area of Higgin's Hole. Among the wildflowers documented in the watershed is the yellow mariposa lily, Calochortus luteus.

== See also ==
- Little Chico Creek
