= KPAY-FM =

Radio station in Chico, California

Coordinates: 39.946°N 121.722°W

Chico, California; United States
- Broadcast area: Chico, California
- Frequency: 93.9 MHz
- Branding: NewsTalk 93.9 KPAY

Programming
- Format: News/talk
- Affiliations: Fox News Radio; Compass Media Networks; Premiere Networks; Westwood One

Ownership
- Owner: Deer Creek Broadcasting; (Deer Creek Broadcasting, LLC)
- Sister stations: KZAP; KHSL-FM; KMXI; KPAY

History
- First air date: 1968 (as KEQR at 93.7)
- Former call signs: KEQR (1968–1970); KCBM (1970–1974); KFMF (1974–2019)
- Former frequencies: 93.7 MHz (1968–1988)

Technical information
- Licensing authority: FCC
- Facility ID: 51637
- Class: B1
- ERP: 2,000 watts
- HAAT: 344 meters (1,129 ft)

Links
- Public license information: Public file; LMS
- Webcast: Listen live
- Website: kpay.com

KPAY-FM (93.9 MHz) is a commercial radio station located in Chico, California. KPAY-FM airs a news/talk format.

== History ==
On August 1, 2019, the then-KFMF changed their format from mainstream rock to a simulcast of news/talk-formatted KPAY (1290 AM). The station changed its call sign to KPAY-FM on August 16, 2019. (KPAY AM is now a Fox Sports Radio affiliate.)

== Notable personalities and shows ==
- The Local Morning News with Scott Michaels, Mike Baca and Anthony Watts
- John Trout
- The Clay Travis and Buck Sexton Show
- Sean Hannity
- Lars Larson
- Mark Levin
- Coast to Coast AM with George Noory
