= KHHZ =

Radio station in Gridley, California (Chico)

- Gridley, California; United States
- Broadcast area: Chico; Oroville; Yuba City
- Frequency: 97.7 MHz
- Branding: La Gran D

Programming
- Format: Regional Mexican

Ownership
- Owner: Bustos Media; (Bustos Media Holdings, LLC)
- Sister stations: KZSZ

History
- First air date: July 6, 1979
- Former call signs: KEWE (1979–1996); KZCO (1996–2000)

Technical information
- Licensing authority: FCC
- Facility ID: 50709
- Class: B1
- ERP: 1,500 watts
- HAAT: 389.0 meters (1,276.2 ft)
- Transmitter coordinates: 39°30′18″N 121°18′35″W
- Translator: 93.3 K227DY (Chico)

Links
- Public license information: Public file; LMS
- Webcast: Listen live
- Website: lagranderadio.com

KHHZ (97.7 FM, La Gran D) is a radio station broadcasting a Regional Mexican format. Licensed to Gridley, California, United States, the station serves the Chico area. The station is currently owned by Bustos Media, through licensee Bustos Media Holdings, LLC.

== History ==
Oroville Radio, Incorporated, filed with the Federal Communications Commission (FCC) on June 25, 1976, to build a new FM radio station in Oroville on 97.7 Mhz. The FCC approved the application on March 15, 1977; the station permit bore the call sign KFAM before Vernon Uecker acquired majority control later in the year. The call letters were changed to KEWE before the station began broadcasting on July 6, 1979. It aired a big band music format; Uecker selected big band because he wanted a more active format than the beautiful music then in vogue, which he termed "background music"; a format he "didn't want to do". The class A station was approved to change to a class B1 outlet by the FCC in 1991.

In 1996, a 71-year-old Uecker announced he was retiring and sold KORV (1340 AM) and KEWE to Z-Spanish Radio Holdings, the highest bidder for the station. On April 1, Z-Spanish took over operation of KEWE. It changed the call letters to KZCO and began programming Regional Mexican music, using its satellite-delivered Z Hot Hits programming. Some upset listeners commented that the format flip was a sign of the times; one told the Paradise Post, "We are being invaded" by Hispanics. A group later bought back KORV to relaunch it as KEWE with big band music in 1998. Z-Spanish changed the call sign from KZCO to KHHZ on March 10, 2000.

In April 2000, Z-Spanish was purchased by Entravision Communications. Entravision then sold the Chico station to Clear Channel Communications, which relaunched it as KHHZ "Radio México, La Gran X" and increased the station's local content. Clear Channel then sold its entire Chico cluster in 2004 to Deer Creek Broadcasting, controlled by Elliot Evers, for $5.1 million. The station's city of license was changed from Oroville to Gridley in 2008 to allow KMJE to change its city of license from Gridley to Woodland.

In 2019, Bustos acquired three stations in the market and proceeded to trade KFMF 93.9 and KZAP 96.7 to Deer Creek in exchange for KHHZ. It then converted KHHZ to its La Gran D format.
