= KZSZ =

Radio station in Colusa, California

Coordinates: 39.288°N 122.335°W

- Colusa, California; United States
- Broadcast area: Chico, California
- Frequency: 107.5 MHz (HD Radio)
- Branding: La Zeta

Programming
- Format: Regional Mexican
- Subchannels: HD2: Spanish Rhythmic "93.3 Urbana"

Ownership
- Owner: Bustos Media; (Bustos Media Holdings, LLC)
- Sister stations: KHHZ

History
- First air date: 1986 (as KTMX)
- Former call signs: KCYM (4/1985-6/1985, CP); KTMX (1985–1991); KPPL (1991–2000); KQPT (2000–2019)

Technical information
- Licensing authority: FCC
- Facility ID: 51638
- Class: B
- ERP: 28,000 watts
- HAAT: 193 meters
- Translator: HD2: 93.3 K227DY (Chico)

Links
- Public license information: Public file; LMS
- Webcast: Listen Live
- Website: kzsz.lazetaradio.com

KZSZ (107.5 FM, "La Zeta") is a commercial radio station located in Colusa, California, broadcasting a regional Mexican format to the Chico, California, Sacramento, Woodland and Yuba City markets in California, on 107.5 FM in Chico.

== History ==
As KQPT, the station previously had a modern adult contemporary music format branded as "107.5 The Point" until March 21, 2011, when it became the principal Top 40 (CHR) station in the Chico/Yuba City radio market from Sacramento north. Following that, it aired a Top 40 (CHR) format branded as "107.5 Now FM", until flipping to its current format on August 1, 2019, following the station's acquisition by Bustos Media. On June 30, 2021, 107.9 K300AD and KZSZ HD2 broke from its La Zeta simulcast and flipped to Spanish rhythmic as "107.9 Urbana".
