= KZAP (FM) =

Coordinates: 39.9624°N 121.7122°W

- KZAP logo
- Paradise, California; United States
- Broadcast area: Chico, California
- Frequency: 96.7 MHz
- Branding: KZAP 96.7

Programming
- Format: Classic hits

Ownership
- Owner: Deer Creek Communications; (Deer Creek Broadcasting, LLC)

History
- First air date: June 4, 1977 (as KNVR)
- Former call signs: KNVR (1977–1992); KZZP (1992–1995)

Technical information
- Licensing authority: FCC
- Facility ID: 56714
- Class: B1
- ERP: 2,450 watts
- HAAT: 317 meters (1,040 ft)

Links
- Public license information: Public file; LMS
- Webcast: Listen Live
- Website: kzap967.com

KZAP (96.7 MHz) is a commercial FM radio station licensed to Paradise, California, United States, with studios and offices in and broadcasting to the Chico, California, area. KZAP airs a classic hits format.

== History ==
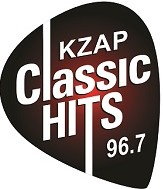
Past logo

The station signed on the air on June 4, 1977, as KNVR-FM, then in 1992 changed to KZZP. In 1995, The "Z" switched to "A" and the current call letters KZAP became reality. KZAP became the market's AC leader in 2000 as "Star 96.7" and in 2002 switched to Rhythmic Top 40 as "Club 96.7". Program director was Randy Zachary, also former owner and main on-air personality at KYIX-FM (now deceased).

On June 18, 2007, KZAP flipped to adult album alternative and adopted the KPIG brand for the Chico area. The format was not successful in the market, and on May 10, 2010, the station switched to its news/talk format. The station then decided to change to an oldies format in March 2011 called "Classic Hits 96.7". After KFMF dropped its classic rock format in August 2019 (following a sale of the stations to Bustos Media, who promptly sold them to Deer Creek Broadcasting), KZAP shifted to a more classic rock-heavy lean, serving as a replacement for KFMF. In addition, Longtime Chico personality Marty Griffin joined the station as program director and Steve Michaels joined as afternoon host, and later as program director in July 2023. Shifting to 1960s-1970s classic hits format,

== See also ==
- KRXQ, broadcast station that used the KZAP call sign from 1968 to 1992
