= Gold Country =

Historic gold-mining region in Northern California

Coordinates: 38.4°N 120.8°W

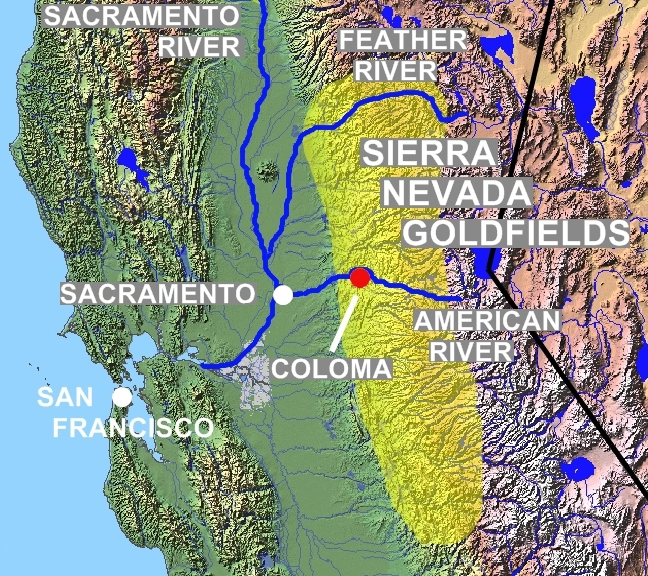
Map of Sierra Nevada gold country

The Gold Country (also known as Mother Lode Country) is a historic region in the northern portion of the U.S. state of California, that is primarily on the western slope of the Sierra Nevada. It is famed for the mineral deposits and gold mines that attracted waves of immigrants, known as the 49ers, during the 1849 California gold rush.

== History ==
When gold was first discovered in 1848, many people came from all over the world to find gold. The migration into California also brought diseases and violence. There were 500 mining camps, of which 300 are still undocumented. There was $400 million in gold mined between 1849 and 1855. In 1942, most of the mines shut down due to World War II. The transportation in Gold Country grew rapidly due to the Gold Rush. The first railroad in California ran through Gold Country. There were 250 different stagecoach companies formed by 1860.

=== Major events by county ===
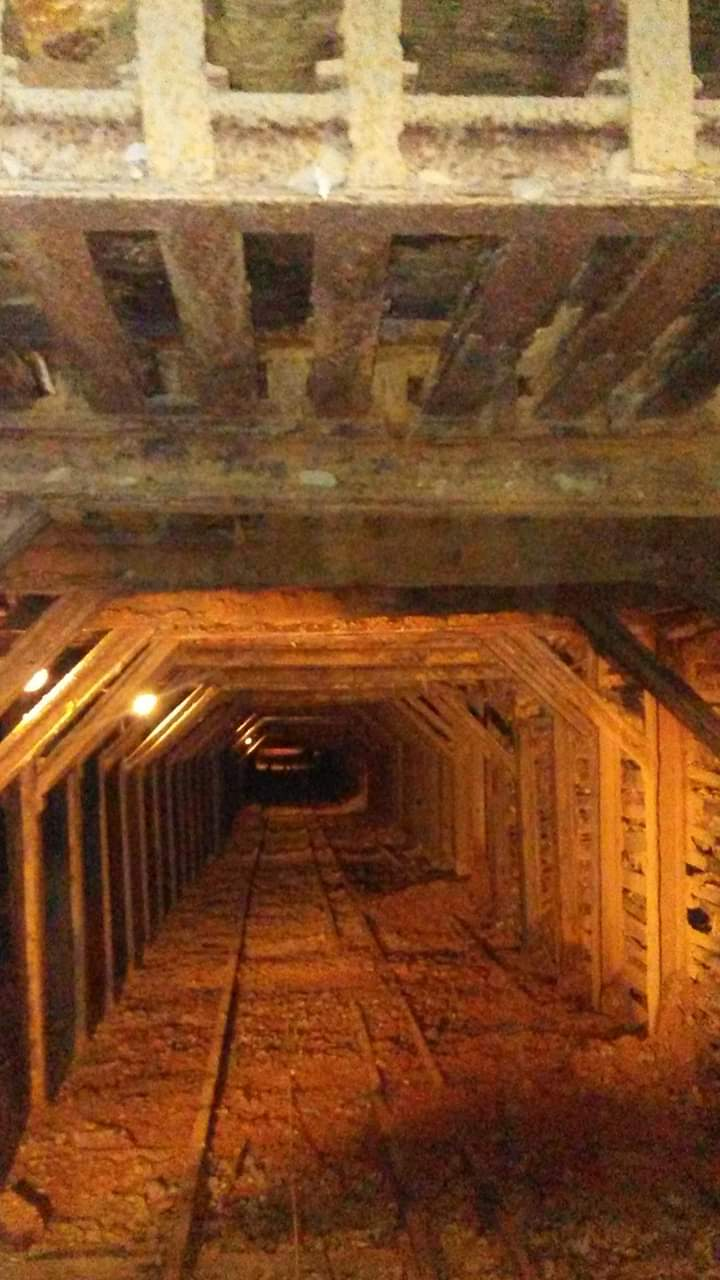
Looking down into the Empire Mine shaft in Grass Valley, California

- Amador County – At the time of the Gold Rush the Kennedy Mine was the deepest in the world, at 5,919 feet (1,804 m). Argonaut Mine was active from 1850 to 1942. In 1922, there was a fire in the area and 47 men were trapped in the mine and died. This mine was shut down due to World War II.
- Butte County – Cherokee was hydraulic-mined from 1860 to 1870. Cherokee was the first place to find diamonds in the United States in 1864. In Oroville a Chinese temple was established in 1863. The Chinese worked on the railroads and mining the area.
- Calaveras County – This county was known for the biggest gold nugget found in the United States. Weighing 195 pounds (88 kg), the nugget was found in Carson Hill. In Copperopolis, $72 million worth of copper was found. Many of the copper mines in this area supplied the Union army's needs in the Civil War. In 1856 Mitchler Hotel was built. Black Bart stayed in this hotel numerous times.
- El Dorado County – This county is the key to the Gold Country. This is where gold was discovered in 1848 by James Marshall at Sutter's Mill. The 13.8 lb Fricot Nugget was found at Spanish Dry Diggings. Sutter's Fort was destroyed by all the people that came here during the Gold Rush.
- Mariposa County – Located in the southern portion of Hwy 49. This county is known for the Ghirardelli Factory dated to 1855–1858. One of the mines in Mariposa County was the Princetown Mine, which pulled out $5 million in gold.
- Nevada County – This county had the most gold out of all of Gold County pulled out of it totaling $440 million worth. Holbrooke Hotel is one of the oldest hotels still operating in Gold Country. It was built in 1851. Empire Mine was a well known mine in the area, which is now a state park. This mine extends 200 miles underground. This mine was still in operation after the war. $100 million worth of gold was extracted from this mine. Nevada County Narrow Gauge Railroad was constructed in 1876. This railroad allowed faster travel between Grass Valley and Nevada City. It was shut down in 1942. In 1851 in North Bloomfield many mines were producing high volumes of gold, but died out by 1853. Malakoff Diggings was known for its booming hydraulic mining.
- Placer County – Colfax was known for a main station for supplies from the Central Pacific Railroad. Many of the area was known for quartz. About $2 million in quartz was found. Placer County was known for the robber "Rattlesnake Dick" in 1850.
- Plumas County – Gold was first found in this county at Rabbit Creek. $60 million in gold was found in the La Porte area. John Bidwell first discovered gold in the Feather River. Spanish Ranch had over $100 million worth of gold come out of it. In Crescent Mill they found a gold vein 20 feet (6.1 m) thick.

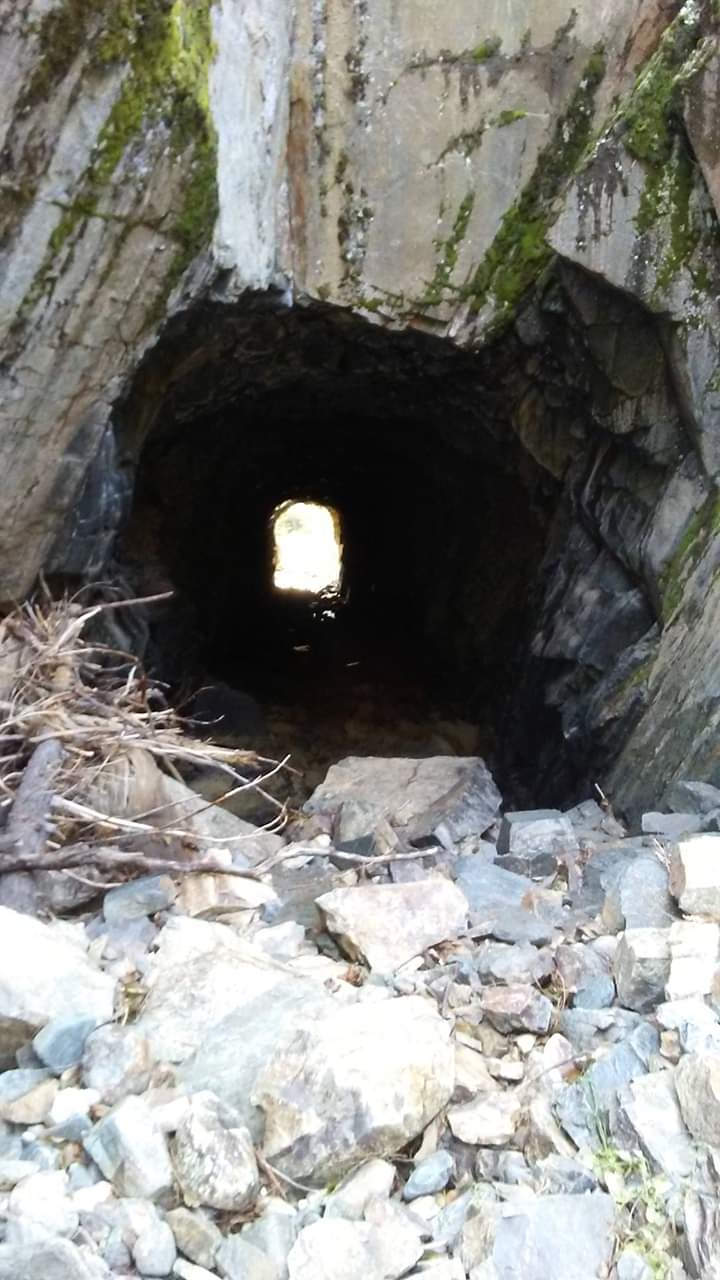
A hole in the mountain in La Porte, California, once used to divert water from Slate Creek

- Sierra County – Allegheny was known for a 163-pound (74 kg) gold nugget. The mine was shut down during the war but then was opened back up in 1965. This mine is still mined occasionally today. In 1992 $70,000 was mined out of it. In 1849 gold was first found in the Yuba river in Downieville. The tale of a 427-pound (194 kg) nugget found near there is unverified. Hydraulic mining was used at Howland Flat and Poker Flat in the 1850s. $700,000 worth of gold came out of Poker Flat alone.
- Tuolumne County – Knights Ferry had the largest covered bridge on the west coast dating back to 1862. In Jamestown they found a 75-pound golden nugget. Sierra Railroad House was built in 1897. It was a popular site for filming movies. Eagle Shawmut Mine had $7.4 million mined out of it.
- Yuba County – This county was known for dredging the rivers, mills, hydraulic mining and its many little towns. Most of the towns were built around trails. They provided hotels, stores, and bars for the newcomers. They had one of the largest dredgers ever, in the Yuba River at one point. It dredged 4.8 million ounces of gold. Black Bart was known in this area for robbing the Wells Fargo stagecoaches coming from La Porte. Colgate Powerhouse went into use for the first time in 1899. It supplied power to Sacramento and Oroville. One of the most famous towns in Yuba County was Camptonville. Gold was first discovered in this town in 1850. The area under the town was so rich in gold that they moved the town to get to the gold. Marysville was a transportation hub for gold to be shipped out to San Francisco. Millions of dollars in gold came through Marysville, one of the biggest cities in California at the time.

== Geology ==
The Gold Country lies on the western slope of the Sierra Nevada, reaching down to the Sacramento Valley. The oldest geology can be found along the easternmost portions of this region, closer to the Sierra Nevada summits, which formed 100 million years ago. It consists of ancient sea floor and portions of islands which were added onto the western edge of North America during the late Paleozoic, about 275 million years ago. The western sections of the Mother Lode are significantly younger, from the mid-Mesozoic about 150 million years ago, and also consist of material that was solidified on the ocean floor to the continental edge. Massive intrusions of granite forced their way into these formations. After ten miles of overlying material was eroded over the last 70 million years, these intrusions became visible throughout the Sierra Nevada. Over the last 50 million years, rivers and volcanoes deposited materials; these built up in thick layers found atop many of the high ridges of the Sierra Nevada foothills.

== Climate ==
This part of California has a Mediterranean climate like much of Italy and Spain, making wine grapes and vineyards one of the region's primary crops and industry. Over 100 wineries are found throughout the Gold Country. Winters are cool and wet with occasional snowfall, especially in the higher elevations of the eastern reaches up the slopes of the Sierra Nevada mountains. Winter temperatures range from the upper twenties to mid-fifties. Summers are dry and hot, with long stretches at or above 100 °F (38 °C). The average annual precipitation is around 30 inches (760 mm). Many dams were built in the Sierra Nevada to hold water. People in California depend on the water that comes from the Sierra Nevada mountains.

== Transportation ==
California State Route 49 is the primary north–south highway through the region, passing through many historic mining communities. Major east–west highways include Interstate 80 and U.S. Route 50.

Two Amtrak routes run through the area. The eastern terminus of the Capitol Corridor is in Auburn. The California Zephyr stops in Colfax.

== Counties and communities ==
Counties and communities that are part of Gold Country include:

- Amador County
  - Amador City
  - Butte City
  - Drytown
  - Fiddletown
  - Ione
  - Jackson
  - Sutter Creek
  - Plymouth
  - Volcano
- Butte County
  - Bangor
  - Cherokee
  - Forbestown
  - Honcut
  - Magalia
  - Paradise
- Calaveras Country
  - Arnold
  - Angels Camp
  - Camanche
  - Carson Hill
  - Copperopolis
  - Murphys
  - San Andreas
  - Valley Springs
- El Dorado County
  - Cameron Park
  - Camino
  - Coloma
  - Diamond Springs
  - El Dorado
  - El Dorado Hills
  - Georgetown
  - Lotus
  - Mount Aukum
  - Placerville
  - Pleasant Valley
  - Pollock Pines
  - Rescue
  - Shingle Springs
  - Somerset
- Mariposa County
  - Mariposa
- Nevada County
  - French Corral
  - Grass Valley
  - Nevada City
  - North Bloomfield
  - Smartsville
  - Timbuctoo
  - Relief Hill
  - Rough and Ready
  - Washington
- Placer County
  - Auburn
  - Colfax
  - Foresthill
  - Meadow Vista
  - Newcastle
- Plumas County
  - Spanish Ranch
- Sacramento County
  - Folsom
- Sierra County
  - Alleghany
  - Downieville
- Tuolumne County
  - Columbia
  - Groveland-Big Oak Flat
  - Knights Ferry
  - Jamestown
  - Sonora
- Yuba County
  - Camptonville
  - Clipper Mills
  - Dobbins
  - Marysville
  - Strawberry Valley
  - Oregon House
  - Woodleaf
