= List of places in California (O) =

List of places in California - O

This list of current:

- cities
- towns, unincorporated communities
- counties, and other recognized places in the U.S. state of California.

Information on the number and names of counties in which the place lies, and its lower and upper ZIP Code bounds, if applicable are also included.

| Name of place | Number of counties | Principal county | Lower zip code | Upper zip code |
|---|---|---|---|---|
| Oak Bottom | 1 | Shasta County | 96095 | |
| Oakdale | 1 | Stanislaus County | 95361 | |
| Oak Glen | 1 | Humboldt County | | |
| Oak Glen | 1 | San Bernardino County | 92399 | |
| Oak Grove | 1 | Butte County | 95965 | |
| Oak Grove | 1 | San Diego County | 92536 | |
| Oak Grove | 1 | Santa Clara County | | |
| Oak Grove | 1 | Tulare County | | |
| Oak Hills | 1 | Monterey County | 92345 | |
| Oak Hills | 1 | San Bernardino County | 92345 | |
| Oakhurst | 1 | Madera County | 93644 | |
| Oak Knoll | 1 | Los Angeles County | | |
| Oak Knoll | 1 | Napa County | | |
| Oak Knoll Hills | 1 | Santa Clara County | 95014 | |
| Oak Knolls | 1 | Santa Barbara County | 93455 | |
| Oakland | 1 | Alameda County | 94601 | 62 |
| Oakland Army Base | 1 | Alameda County | 94626 | |
| Oakland Naval Regional Medical Center | 1 | Alameda County | 94627 | |
| Oakland Naval Supply Center | 1 | Alameda County | 94625 | |
| Oakland Recreational Camp | 1 | Tuolumne County | 95321 | |
| Oakley | 1 | Contra Costa County | 94561 | |
| Oakmont | 1 | Sonoma County | | |
| Oak Park | 1 | Sacramento County | 95817 | |
| Oak Park | 1 | San Luis Obispo County | 93446 | |
| Oak Park | 1 | Ventura County | | |
| Oakridge | 1 | San Joaquin County | | |
| Oak Run | 1 | Shasta County | 96069 | |
| Oaks | 1 | San Luis Obispo County | 93420 | |
| Oak Valley | 1 | Ventura County | 91301 | |
| Oak View | 1 | Ventura County | 93022 | |
| Oak Village | 1 | Ventura County | | |
| Oakville | 1 | Napa County | 94562 | |
| Oakwood | 1 | Los Angeles County | 90004 | |
| Oasis | 1 | Riverside County | 92274 | |
| Oban | 1 | Los Angeles County | | |
| Obie | 1 | Shasta County | | |
| Obie Junction | 1 | Siskiyou County | | |
| Obregon | 1 | Imperial County | | |
| O'Brien | 1 | Shasta County | 96070 | |
| Occidental | 1 | Sonoma County | 95465 | |
| Ocean Beach | 1 | San Diego County | 92107 | |
| Oceano | 1 | San Luis Obispo County | 93445 | |
| Ocean Park | 1 | Los Angeles County | 90405 | |
| Oceanside | 1 | San Diego County | 92049 | 58 |
| Ocean View | 1 | Los Angeles County | | |
| Ocean View | 1 | Orange County | | |
| Ocean View | 1 | San Francisco County | | |
| Ocean View | 1 | Sonoma County | 94923 | |
| Ockenden | 1 | Fresno County | | |
| Ocotillo | 1 | Imperial County | 92259 | |
| Ocotillo Wells | 1 | San Diego County | 92004 | |
| Octol | 1 | Tulare County | | |
| Ogilby | 1 | Imperial County | | |
| Oil City | 1 | Kern County | | |
| Oildale | 1 | Kern County | 93308 | |
| Ojai | 1 | Ventura County | 93023 | |
| Ojala | 1 | Ventura County | | |
| Olancha | 1 | Inyo County | 93549 | |
| Olcott | 1 | Solano County | | |
| Old Adobe | 1 | San Luis Obispo County | | |
| Old Bretz Mill | 1 | Fresno County | | |
| Old Dale | 1 | San Bernardino County | | |
| Old Forbestown | 1 | Butte County | | |
| Old Fort Jim | 1 | El Dorado County | 95667 | |
| Old Fort Tejon | 1 | Kern County | | |
| Old Gilroy | 1 | Santa Clara County | 95020 | |
| Old Hilltown | 1 | Monterey County | | |
| Old Hopland | 1 | Mendocino County | 95449 | |
| Old Mammoth | 1 | Mono County | 93546 | |
| Old Pino | 1 | El Dorado County | | |
| Old Point Comfort | 1 | Los Angeles County | | |
| Old River | 1 | Kern County | 93305 | |
| Old San Diego | 1 | San Diego County | 92110 | |
| Old Station | 1 | Shasta County | 96071 | |
| Old Town | 1 | Santa Barbara County | | |
| Old Towne | 1 | Kern County | 93561 | |
| Old Town San Diego | 1 | San Diego County | 92110 | |
| Oleander | 1 | Fresno County | 93706 | |
| Olema | 1 | Marin County | 94950 | |
| Oleo | 1 | Orange County | | |
| Oleum | 1 | Contra Costa County | | |
| Olga | 1 | Los Angeles County | | |
| Olinda | 1 | Orange County | 92821 | |
| Olinda | 1 | Shasta County | 96007 | |
| Olive | 1 | Orange County | 92865 | |
| Olive Hill | 1 | Yuba County | | |
| Olivehurst | 1 | Yuba County | 95961 | |
| Olivenhain | 1 | San Diego County | 92024 | |
| Oliveto | 1 | Sonoma County | | |
| Olive View | 1 | Los Angeles County | | |
| Olympia | 1 | Santa Cruz County | 95018 | |
| Olympic Valley | 1 | Placer County | 96146 | |
| Omega | 1 | Nevada County | | |
| Omira | 1 | Lassen County | | |
| Omo Ranch | 1 | El Dorado County | 95684 | |
| Omus | 1 | Sonoma County | | |
| O'Neals | 1 | Madera County | 93645 | |
| One Hundred Palms | 1 | Riverside County | 92274 | |
| Ono | 1 | San Bernardino County | | |
| Ono | 1 | Shasta County | 96072 | |
| Ontario | 1 | San Bernardino County | 91758 | 64 |
| Ontario International Airport | 1 | San Bernardino County | 91761 | |
| Onyx | 1 | Kern County | 93255 | |
| Opal Cliffs | 1 | Santa Cruz County | 95062 | |
| Ophir | 1 | Placer County | 95603 | |
| Optimo | 1 | Butte County | | |
| Ora | 1 | Fresno County | | |
| Orange | 1 | Orange County | 92857 | 69 |
| Orange Center | 1 | Riverside County | | |
| Orange Cove | 1 | Fresno County | 93646 | |
| Orange Glen | 1 | San Diego County | 92027 | |
| Orange Heights | 1 | San Bernardino County | 91786 | |
| Orangehurst | 1 | Orange County | 92633 | |
| Orange Park Acres | 1 | Orange County | 92869 | |
| Orangevale | 1 | Sacramento County | 95662 | |
| Orangwood | 1 | Los Angeles County | 91105 | |
| Orcutt | 1 | Santa Barbara County | 93455 | |
| Ord | 1 | Monterey County | | |
| Ordbend | 1 | Glenn County | 95943 | |
| Ordway | 1 | San Bernardino County | | |
| Oregon City | 1 | Butte County | 95965 | |
| Oregon House | 1 | Yuba County | 95962 | |
| Orford | 1 | San Joaquin County | | |
| Orick | 1 | Humboldt County | 95555 | |
| Orinda | 1 | Contra Costa County | 94563 | |
| Orinda Village | 1 | Contra Costa County | 94563 | |
| Orland | 1 | Glenn County | 95963 | |
| Orleans | 1 | Humboldt County | 95556 | |
| Orleans Flat | 1 | Nevada County | | |
| Ormand | 1 | Riverside County | 92509 | |
| Oro Fino | 1 | Siskiyou County | 96032 | |
| Oro Grande | 1 | San Bernardino County | 92368 | |
| Oro Loma | 1 | Fresno County | 93622 | |
| Orosi | 1 | Tulare County | 93647 | |
| Orosi | 1 | Tulare County | 93647 | |
| Oroville | 1 | Butte County | 95965 | |
| Oroville East | 1 | Butte County | | |
| Oroville Junc | 1 | Butte County | | |
| Orris | 1 | Tulare County | | |
| Orrs Springs | 1 | Mendocino County | | |
| Ortega | 1 | San Joaquin County | | |
| Ortega | 1 | Santa Barbara County | | |
| Ortonville | 1 | Ventura County | | |
| Osbourne | 1 | Los Angeles County | 90028 | |
| Ostrom | 1 | Yuba County | | |
| Oswald | 1 | Sutter County | | |
| Otay | 1 | San Diego County | 92010 | |
| Otay Mesa | 1 | San Diego County | 92154 | |
| Otterbein | 1 | Los Angeles County | 91748 | |
| Outingdale | 1 | El Dorado County | 95684 | |
| Outlet | 1 | Mendocino County | | |
| Oval | 1 | Tulare County | 93291 | |
| Overlook | 1 | San Diego County | | |
| Owenyo | 1 | Inyo County | | |
| Owl | 1 | Riverside County | | |
| Oxalis | 1 | Fresno County | | |
| Oxford | 1 | Solano County | | |
| Oxford Mill | 1 | Sierra County | | |
| Oxnard | 1 | Ventura County | 93030 | 36 |
| Oxnard Airport | 1 | Ventura County | 93030 | |
| Oxnard Beach | 1 | Ventura County | 93035 | |
| Oxy | 1 | San Bernardino County | | |
| Ozol | 1 | Contra Costa County | | |
