= California Historical Landmarks in Yuba County =

This list includes properties and districts listed on the California Historical Landmark listing in Yuba County, California. Click the "Map of all coordinates" link to the right to view a Google map of all properties and districts with latitude and longitude coordinates in the table below.

Image		Landmark name	Location	City or town	Summary
Bok Kai Temple	889	Bok Kai Temple	First and D Sts; 39°08′06″N 121°35′13″W	Marysville	Also on the NRHP list as NPS-75000498
Johnson's Ranch	493	Johnson's Ranch	Tomita Park; 39°00′37″N 121°25′23″W	Wheatland	
Marysville Assembly Center	934	Marysville Assembly Center	Arboga Assembly Center Memorial Site and Interpretive Center; 39°02′52″N 121°34′29″W	Marysville	
Overland Emigrant Trail	799-3	Overland Emigrant Trail	Spenceville Rd. 39°02′23″N 121°23′06″W	Wheatland	
Smartsville	321	Smartsville	8444 Smartville Rd. 39°12′27″N 121°17′55″W	Smartsville, California	California Historic Point of Interest plaque is located at Church of Immaculate Conception.
Timbuctoo	320	Timbuctoo	Historic district 39°13′01″N 121°19′07″W	Timbuctoo	
Wheatland Hop Riot	1003	Wheatland Hop Riot	S. 'A' St. and 6th St. 39°00′46″N 121°25′08″W	Wheatland	

== See also ==
- List of California Historical Landmarks
- National Register of Historic Places listings in Yuba County, California
