= Oregon Creek Covered Bridge =

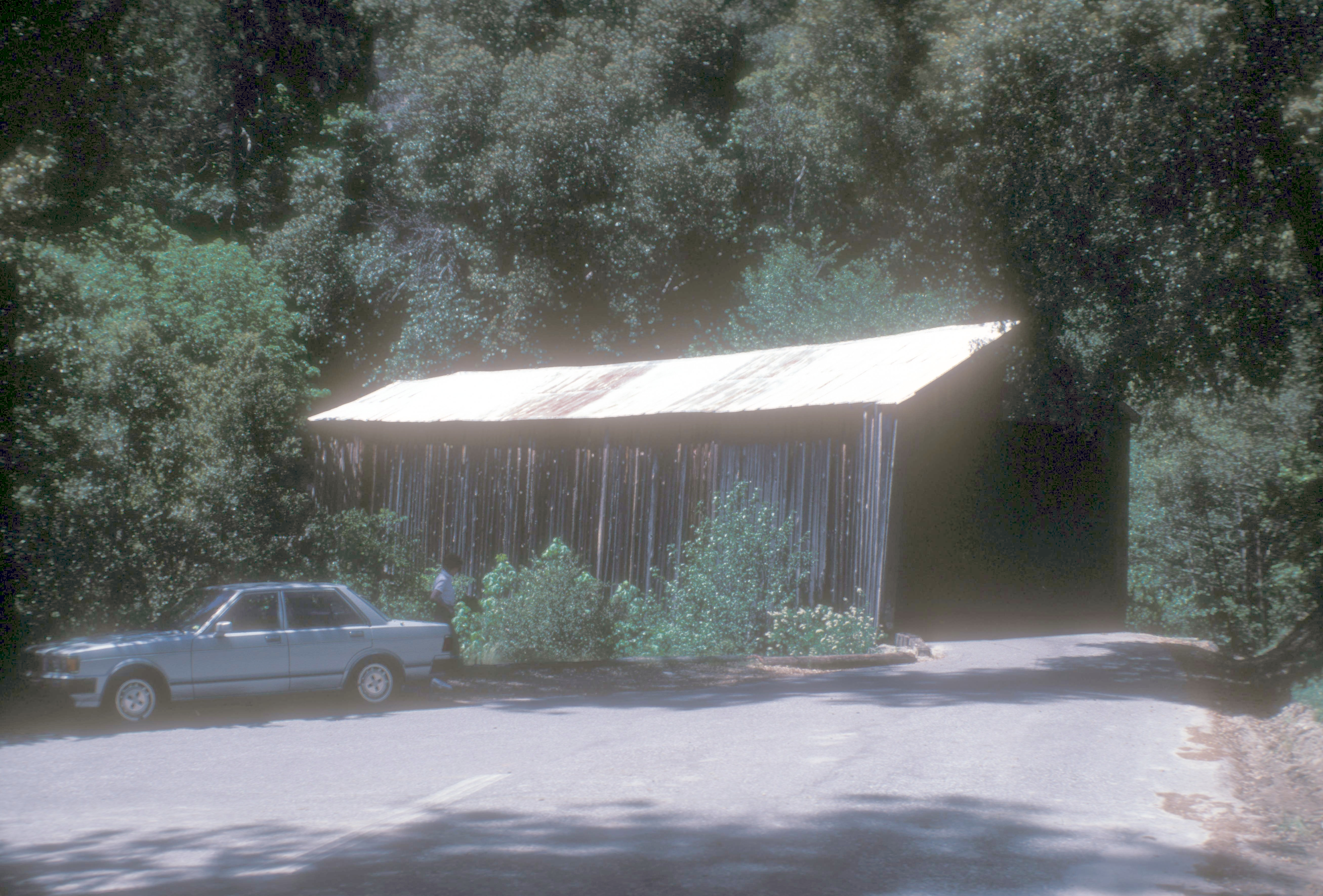
- Coordinates: 39°24′N 121°05′W
- Carries: Pedestrian
- Crosses: Oregon Creek
- Locale: Yuba County, California

Characteristics
- Design: Queen post truss covered bridge
- Total length: 101.1 feet (30.8 m)
- Width: 11.8 feet (3.6 m)
- Longest span: 77.1 feet (23.5 m)

History
- Designer: Unknown
- Opened: 1860-1871
- Oregon Creek Covered Bridge
- U.S. National Register of Historic Places
- Location within California
- Nearest city: North San Juan, California
- Coordinates: 39°23′49″N 121°04′55″W
- Built: 1860-1871
- Architectural style: Queen post truss covered bridge
- NRHP reference No.: 75000499
- Added to NRHP: May 30, 1975

Location
- Interactive map of Oregon Creek Covered Bridge

Oregon Creek Covered Bridge is a historic bridge that spans Oregon Creek just above its confluence with Middle Yuba River. It is located approximately 3 miles northeast of the community of North San Juan just off California State Route 49 within the Oregon Creek Day Use Area of the Tahoe National Forest.

== Current status ==
The bridge was rehabilitated in early 2018 and is now open to light motor vehicles, with a 5-ton weight limit. This involved replacing the entire cover, and reworking the abutments.

Prior to this, the bridge was officially closed to all traffic but pedestrians can and do access it. The National Bridge Inventory lists it as "structurally deficient." There is extensive graffiti inside. The roof is now covered with corrugated metal sheeting and the deck is supported by metal I-beams.

This description was written in 1974 on the Nomination Form for the bridge's inclusion on the National Register of Historic Places:

The hand hewn wooden Ponderosa Pine beams are approximately 16 inches square and are still sound. The sides consist of wooden siding and the structure originally had a shake roof. The abutments were originally of unmortared stone construction. The east abutment appears to be as originally constructed, however, the west abutment was faced with concrete at some later date. Yuba County replaced the wooden siding and replaced the shake roof with one of corrugated tin because of the snow loads, some 40 to 50 years ago.

== History ==
The bridge was added to the National Register of Historic Places in 1975. The following is excerpted from the Nomination Form, which was filled out in 1974 by George W. Taylor, Land Use Planner for the Tahoe National Forest:

The covered bridge over Oregon Creek has been used continuously since its construction over a century ago. The actual construction date is in question, however. Thompson and West indicates that Tom Freeman built a bridge across Oregon Creek in 1858 and in 1871 built another a little above the first at a cost of $2,500.00. The original bridge was washed away subsequent to the construction of the new bridge. (1879:100)

Other references quote various dates, including 1860, 1861 and 1862 as the year that the bridge was constructed. (Adams 1963:134) In any event, this bridge is either the oldest, or one of the oldest covered bridges in the western United States still in general use. (Adams 1963:134)

Tom Freeman, who built the bridge, operated it and another bridge across the Middle Yuba River nearby, as toll bridges, apparently until his death, in 1892. Subsequently, Yuba County acquired the bridge and still operates it. The date of acquisition is unverified, but is thought to be about 1910. (Thompson § West 1879:100) The bridge is unique in the annals of American covered bridge building in that the portals curve to meet the traveler at either end. (Adams 1963:134)

In 1883, the failure of the English Dam far upstream on the Middle Yuba River sent a mass of water flooding downstream. The high flood waters surged upstream in Oregon Creek, lifted the bridge from its abutments and carried it away. When the flood waters subsided, the bridge was found some 50 yards below its original location. Mr. Freeman hired a logging contractor, Solon Chatfield, to return the bridge to its abutments. However, during the flood the bridge had been turned end for end and the west end of the bridge was placed on the east abutment and the east end on the west abutment as it has remained to the present time (Adams 1963:134) (Smith 3-29-64)

Historically, the bridge served local mining and logging communities and carried traffic on what was called Allegheny Ridge Road, part of the Henness Pass Road, a major freight hauling route over the Sierra Nevada via Henness Pass after the Comstock Lode discovery in Virginia City in 1859 sparked a Nevada mining boom. This route was attractive because goods could be shipped up the Sacramento River from the San Francisco Bay to Marysville before being loaded onto wagons for the trans-Sierra journey.

== See also ==
- List of bridges in the United States
- List of covered bridges in California
