= Oro Fino =

Oro Fino is Spanish for "fine gold" and may refer to:

- Oro Fino, California, a gold mining camp in Siskiyou County, California
- Oro Fino, the original title of the Spanish film Fine Gold
- Orofino, Idaho
- Orofino Creek
