= National Register of Historic Places listings in Yuba County, California =

Location of Yuba County in California

This is a list of the National Register of Historic Places listings in Yuba County, California.

This is intended to be a complete list of the properties and districts on the National Register of Historic Places in Yuba County, California, United States. Latitude and longitude coordinates are provided for many National Register properties and districts; these locations may be seen together in a Google map.

There are 11 properties and districts listed on the National Register in the county. Another 2 properties were once listed but have been removed.

This National Park Service list is complete through NPS recent listings posted September 4, 2026.

== Current listings ==
	Name on the Register	Image	Date listed	Location	City or town	Description
1	Bok Kai Temple	Bok Kai Temple	May 21, 1975 (#75000498)	Yuba River Levee at D St. 39°08′06″N 121°35′13″W	Marysville	
2	Hart Building	Hart Building	January 28, 1982 (#82002285)	423-425 4th St. 39°08′22″N 121°35′19″W	Marysville	
3	Johnson Ranch and Burtis Hotel Sites	Johnson Ranch and Burtis Hotel Sites	July 22, 1991 (#91000919)	Address Restricted	Wheatland	
4	Marysville Historic Commercial District	Marysville Historic Commercial District	June 10, 1999 (#99000692)	Roughly bounded by First, Sixth, C, and E Sts. 39°08′18″N 121°35′19″W	Marysville	
5	Warren P. Miller House	Warren P. Miller House	March 12, 1998 (#98000225)	704 D St. 39°08′34″N 121°35′23″W	Marysville	
6	Oregon Creek Covered Bridge	Oregon Creek Covered Bridge	May 30, 1975 (#75000499)	3 miles (4.8 km) northeast of North San Juan over Oregon Creek; 39°23′48″N 121°04′52″W	North San Juan	
7	Packard Library	Packard Library	December 18, 1978 (#78000829)	301 4th St. 39°08′23″N 121°35′16″W	Marysville	
8	Jose Manuel Ramirez House	Jose Manuel Ramirez House	January 17, 1976 (#76000545)	220 5th St. 39°08′25″N 121°35′13″W	Marysville	
9	U.S. Post Office – Marysville Main	U.S. Post Office – Marysville Main	January 11, 1985 (#85000143)	407 C St. 39°08′23″N 121°35′13″W	Marysville	
10	Wheatland Masonic Temple	Wheatland Masonic Temple	December 23, 1993 (#93001396)	400 Front St. 39°00′40″N 121°25′20″W	Wheatland	
11	Woodleaf Hotel	Woodleaf Hotel	April 9, 1975 (#75000500)	Marysville-La Porte Rd. 39°31′04″N 121°11′26″W	Woodleaf	

== Former listings ==
	Name on the Register	Image	Date listed	Date removed	Location	City or town	Description
1	Decker-Jewett Bank		December 22, 1976 (#76000543)	May 10, 1982	212 D St.	Marysville	Demolished July 22, 1977.
2	Ellis Building		December 22, 1976 (#76000544)	May 10, 1982	100 D St.	Marysville	Demolished August 16, 1977.

== See also ==
- List of National Historic Landmarks in California
- National Register of Historic Places listings in California
- California Historical Landmarks in Yuba County, California
