= Greenville, Yuba County, California =

Ghost town in California, United States

Greenville
- Ghost town
- Location in California Greenville (the United States)
- Coordinates: 39°26′12″N 121°10′39″W
- Country: United States
- State: California
- County: Yuba
- Elevation: 2,182 ft (665 m)

Greenville (formerly, Oregon Hill) is a former settlement in Yuba County, California, United States. It was located on Little Oregon Creek, 4.25 miles (6.8 km) southeast of Challenge, at an elevation of 2182 feet (665 m).

A post office operated at Greenville from 1857 to 1860.

In the late nineteenth century, Greenville had several hundred residents, a store, and a school. A narrow-gauge logging railroad connecting Challenge with the nearby Beanville Mill stopped in Greenville. By 1957, Greenville was essentially a ghost town.
