= George Gephard =

American politician

George Gephard (c. 1830–1901) was an early settler in Nevada County, California, where he built a toll road, and later was a member of the Los Angeles Common Council, the governing body of that city. He was said to be responsible for getting together enough money to establish a state normal school in Los Angeles, the forerunner of the University of California branch in that city.

== Family ==
Gephard was born in Alsace-Lorraine, at that time part of France, in about 1830 and was brought to America as a baby. He spent his boyhood in Western Pennsylvania.

He was married and left his widow and two daughters when he died in his residence at 238 North Grand Avenue on April 12, 1901, at the age of 71. One daughter, Frances, was the wife of J. J. Meyler and the other, Nettie Gephard, lived at the family home. Interment was at Evergreen Cemetery, Los Angeles.

== Vocation ==
Gephard came across the plains in 1850, taking up mining and lumbering in Nevada County. Eventually he built a toll road with one terminus at Rough and Ready and Grass Valley, California, and the other at Smartville and Nevada City.

In 1876 he moved to Los Angeles and invested in real estate.

== Public service ==
Gephard was elected on December 6, 1880. to represent the 3rd Ward on the Los Angeles Common Council, for a two-year term, but he resigned on November 12, 1881.

He also ran for county treasurer and came "within a few votes" of being elected.

He had a particular interest in the development of a branch normal school in Los Angeles, and "when a site was to be purchased [on Fifth Street where the central Los Angeles Public Library now stands], in order to get an appropriation for the building, he personally assumed charge of the matter and raised $8000 to buy the ground." The school he helped establish was moved in 1929 to Westwood and was eventually transformed into the University of California, Los Angeles.

== References and notes ==
Access to the Los Angeles Times links may require the use of a library card.
