= Loma Rica, California =

Loma Rica
- census-designated place
- Location in Yuba County and the state of California

- Location in the United States
- Coordinates: 39°18′43″N 121°25′04″W
- Country: United States
- State: California
- County: Yuba

Area
  - Total: 18.487 sq mi (47.881 km^{2})
  - Land: 18.487 sq mi (47.881 km^{2})
  - Water: 0 sq mi (0 km^{2}) 0%
- Elevation: 410 ft (125 m)

Population (2020)
  - Total: 2,409
  - Density: 130.3/sq mi (50.31/km^{2})
- Time zone: UTC-8 (Pacific (PST))
  - Summer (DST): UTC-7 (PDT)
- ZIP code: 95901
- Area code: 530
- FIPS code: 06-42412
- GNIS feature ID: 0277544

Loma Rica (Spanish for "Rich Hill") is a census-designated place (CDP) in Yuba County, California, United States. The population was 2,409 at the 2020 census, up from 2,368 at the 2010 census. Loma Rica is located 15 miles (24 km) northeast of Marysville.

== Geography ==
Loma Rica is located at 39°18′43″N 121°25′04″W.

According to the United States Census Bureau, the CDP has a total area of 18.5 square miles (48 km^{2}), all land.

== Demographics ==
Historical population
Census	Pop.	Note	%±
1990	1,852		—
2000	2,075		12.0%
2010	2,368		14.1%
2020	2,409		1.7%
U.S. Decennial Census; 1860–1870 1880-1890; 1900 1910 1920; 1930 1940 1950; 1960 1970 1980; 1990 2000 2010; 2020

Loma Rica first appeared as a census designated place in the 1990 U.S. census.

=== 2020 census ===
As of the 2020 census, Loma Rica had a population of 2,409 and a population density of 130.3 inhabitants per square mile (50.3/km^{2}).

The age distribution was 19.0% under the age of 18, 6.7% aged 18 to 24, 20.1% aged 25 to 44, 29.3% aged 45 to 64, and 24.9% who were 65 years of age or older. The median age was 48.9 years. For every 100 females, there were 99.8 males, and for every 100 females age 18 and over, there were 99.3 males age 18 and over.

The census reported that 99.2% of the population lived in households, 0.8% lived in non-institutionalized group quarters, and no one was institutionalized. There were 879 households, out of which 27.1% included children under the age of 18, 65.4% were married-couple households, 5.8% were cohabiting couple households, 14.7% had a male householder with no spouse or partner present, and 14.1% had a female householder with no spouse or partner present. 16.5% of households were one person, and 8.2% were one person aged 65 or older. The average household size was 2.72. There were 678 families (77.1% of all households).

There were 952 housing units at an average density of 51.5 units per square mile (19.9 units/km^{2}), of which 879 (92.3%) were occupied. Of occupied units, 89.9% were owner-occupied and 10.1% were occupied by renters. 7.7% of housing units were vacant. The homeowner vacancy rate was 0.9% and the rental vacancy rate was 4.3%.

0.0% of residents lived in urban areas, while 100.0% lived in rural areas.

Racial composition as of the 2020 census
Race	Number	Percent
White	1,915	79.5%
Black or African American	17	0.7%
American Indian and Alaska Native	40	1.7%
Asian	47	2.0%
Native Hawaiian and Other Pacific Islander	5	0.2%
Some other race	118	4.9%
Two or more races	267	11.1%
Hispanic or Latino (of any race)	293	12.2%

=== Income and poverty ===
In 2023, the US Census Bureau estimated that the median household income in 2023 was $98,935, and the per capita income was $44,125. About 10.6% of the population were below the poverty line.

=== 2010 census ===
The 2010 United States census reported that Loma Rica had a population of 2,368. The population density was 128.1 inhabitants per square mile (49.5/km^{2}). The racial makeup of Loma Rica was 2,085 (88.0%) White, 20 (0.8%) African American, 60 (2.5%) Native American, 20 (0.8%) Asian, 2 (0.1%) Pacific Islander, 52 (2.2%) from other races, and 129 (5.4%) from two or more races. Hispanic or Latino of any race were 211 persons (8.9%).

The Census reported that 2,368 people (100% of the population) lived in households, 0 (0%) lived in non-institutionalized group quarters, and 0 (0%) were institutionalized.

There were 885 households, out of which 264 (29.8%) had children under the age of 18 living in them, 577 (65.2%) were opposite-sex married couples living together, 66 (7.5%) had a female householder with no husband present, 28 (3.2%) had a male householder with no wife present. There were 44 (5.0%) unmarried opposite-sex partnerships, and 5 (0.6%) same-sex married couples or partnerships. 161 households (18.2%) were made up of individuals, and 75 (8.5%) had someone living alone who was 65 years of age or older. The average household size was 2.68. There were 671 families (75.8% of all households); the average family size was 3.03.

The population was spread out, with 508 people (21.5%) under the age of 18, 151 people (6.4%) aged 18 to 24, 424 people (17.9%) aged 25 to 44, 865 people (36.5%) aged 45 to 64, and 420 people (17.7%) who were 65 years of age or older. The median age was 47.4 years. For every 100 females, there were 98.7 males. For every 100 females age 18 and over, there were 97.2 males.

There were 985 housing units at an average density of 53.3 per square mile (20.6/km^{2}), of which 758 (85.6%) were owner-occupied, and 127 (14.4%) were occupied by renters. The homeowner vacancy rate was 3.1%; the rental vacancy rate was 11.8%. 1,998 people (84.4% of the population) lived in owner-occupied housing units and 370 people (15.6%) lived in rental housing units.

== Government ==
In the California State Legislature, Loma Rica is in the 1st senatorial district, represented by Republican Megan Dahle, and in the 3rd Assembly district, represented by Vacant.

In the United States House of Representatives, Loma Rica is in California's 3rd congressional district, represented by Independent Kevin Kiley.
