= Oak Valley, California =

Unincorporated community in California, United States

Oak Valley
- Unincorporated community
- Location in California Oak Valley (the United States)
- Coordinates: 39°29′55″N 121°02′17″W
- Country: United States
- State: California
- County: Yuba
- Elevation: 3,012 ft (918 m)

Oak Valley is an unincorporated community in Yuba County, California, United States. It is located 5.5 miles (8.9 km) south-southeast of Strawberry Valley, at an elevation of 3012 feet (918 m).

Oak Valley "This little mining town is situated on the head waters of Oak Valley Creek, two miles from North Yuba River, and six miles northeast from Camptonville. It received its name on account of oak timber growing in the vicinity. Gold was discovered here about the same time as at the other diggings, and quite a town sprang up. In 1855, there were one hundred men here, a store, saloon, restaurant, hotel, etc. For ten years the town thrived and then went down as did most of the other places. There are about twenty men at work now, and a store and saloon combined kept by a Frenchman." - Thompson & West, History of Yuba County, 1879

The town at its founding is the setting of Catherine Bell's 2014 novel, Rush of Shadows.
