= Challenge–Brownsville, California =

Challenge–Brownsville
- census-designated place
- Location in Yuba County and the state of California

- Location in the United States
- Coordinates: 39°28′21″N 121°15′54″W
- Country: United States
- State: California
- County: Yuba

Area
  - Total: 9.71 sq mi (25.14 km^{2})
  - Land: 9.71 sq mi (25.14 km^{2})
  - Water: 0 sq mi (0.00 km^{2}) 0%

Population (2020)
  - Total: 1,161
  - Density: 119.6/sq mi (46.19/km^{2})
- Time zone: UTC-8 (Pacific (PST))
  - Summer (DST): UTC-7 (PDT)
- ZIP code: 95919 (but the southwestern part is 95972)
- Area code: 530
- FIPS code: 06-12612

Challenge–Brownsville is a census-designated place (CDP) in Yuba County, California, United States. The population was 1,161 according to the 2020 Census.

Despite strong opposition from local community members, Asatru Folk Assembly, a religious group, moved there in 2015.

== Geography ==
Challenge–Brownsville is located at 39°28′21″N 121°15′54″W (39.472574, -121.265028).

According to the United States Census Bureau, the CDP has a total area of 9.7 square miles (25 km^{2}), all land.

== Demographics ==
Historical population
Census	Pop.	Note	%±
1990	1,096		—
2000	1,069		−2.5%
2010	1,148		7.4%
2020	1,161		1.1%
U.S. Decennial Census; 1860–1870 1880-1890; 1900 1910 1920; 1930 1940 1950; 1960 1970 1980; 1990 2000 2010; 2020

Challenge–Brownsville first appeared as a census designated place in the 1990 U.S. Census.

=== 2010 ===
The 2010 United States census reported that Challenge–Brownsville had a population of 1,148. The population density was 118.8 inhabitants per square mile (45.9/km^{2}). The racial makeup of Challenge–Brownsville was 1,006 (87.6%) White, 10 (0.9%) African American, 31 (2.7%) Native American, 5 (0.4%) Asian, 3 (0.3%) Pacific Islander, 10 (0.9%) from other races, and 83 (7.2%) from two or more races. Hispanic or Latino of any race were 90 persons (7.8%).

The Census reported that 1,143 people (99.6% of the population) lived in households, 5 (0.4%) lived in non-institutionalized group quarters, and 0 (0%) were institutionalized.

There were 476 households, out of which 115 (24.2%) had children under the age of 18 living in them, 235 (49.4%) were opposite-sex married couples living together, 52 (10.9%) had a female householder with no husband present, 21 (4.4%) had a male householder with no wife present. There were 35 (7.4%) unmarried opposite-sex partnerships, and 1 (0.2%) same-sex married couples or partnerships. 130 households (27.3%) were made up of individuals, and 59 (12.4%) had someone living alone who was 65 years of age or older. The average household size was 2.40. There were 308 families (64.7% of all households); the average family size was 2.90.

The population was spread out, with 228 people (19.9%) under the age of 18, 85 people (7.4%) aged 18 to 24, 218 people (19.0%) aged 25 to 44, 368 people (32.1%) aged 45 to 64, and 249 people (21.7%) who were 65 years of age or older. The median age was 47.7 years. For every 100 females there were 100.3 males. For every 100 females age 18 and over, there were 92.5 males.

There were 594 housing units at an average density of 61.5 per square mile (23.7/km^{2}), of which 339 (71.2%) were owner-occupied, and 137 (28.8%) were occupied by renters. The homeowner vacancy rate was 5.2%; the rental vacancy rate was 10.3%. 784 people (68.3% of the population) lived in owner-occupied housing units and 359 people (31.3%) lived in rental housing units.

=== 2000 ===
As of the census of 2000, there were 1,069 people, 491 households, and 322 families residing in the CDP. The population density was 110.6 inhabitants per square mile (42.7/km^{2}). There were 580 housing units at an average density of 60.0 per square mile (23.2/km^{2}). The racial makeup of the CDP was 92.61% White, 0.37% African American, 1.78% Native American, 0.56% Asian, 0.47% from other races, and 4.21% from two or more races. Hispanic or Latino of any race were 2.81% of the population.

There were 491 households, out of which 17.5% had children under the age of 18 living with them, 54.2% were married couples living together, 7.7% had a female householder with no husband present, and 34.4% were non-families. 29.5% of all households were made up of individuals, and 16.7% had someone living alone who was 65 years of age or older. The average household size was 2.17 and the average family size was 2.65.

In the CDP, the population was spread out, with 18.5% under the age of 18, 4.8% from 18 to 24, 17.6% from 25 to 44, 29.7% from 45 to 64, and 29.5% who were 65 years of age or older. The median age was 51 years. For every 100 females there were 95.4 males. For every 100 females age 18 and over, there were 91.4 males.

The median income for a household in the CDP was $27,037, and the median income for a family was $36,607. Males had a median income of $32,353 versus $18,889 for females. The per capita income for the CDP was $14,917. About 16.2% of families and 16.9% of the population were below the poverty line, including 12.8% of those under age 18 and 6.3% of those age 65 or over.

== Government ==
In the California State Legislature, Challenge–Brownsville is in the 1st senatorial district, represented by Republican Megan Dahle, and in the 3rd Assembly district, represented by Vacant.

In the United States House of Representatives, Challenge–Brownsville is in California's 3rd congressional district, represented by Independent Kevin Kiley.
