= Arboga, California =

Unincorporated community in California, United States

Arboga
- Unincorporated community
- Location in California Arboga (the United States)
- Coordinates: 39°03′05″N 121°33′21″W
- Country: United States
- State: California
- County: Yuba
- Elevation: 56 ft (17 m)

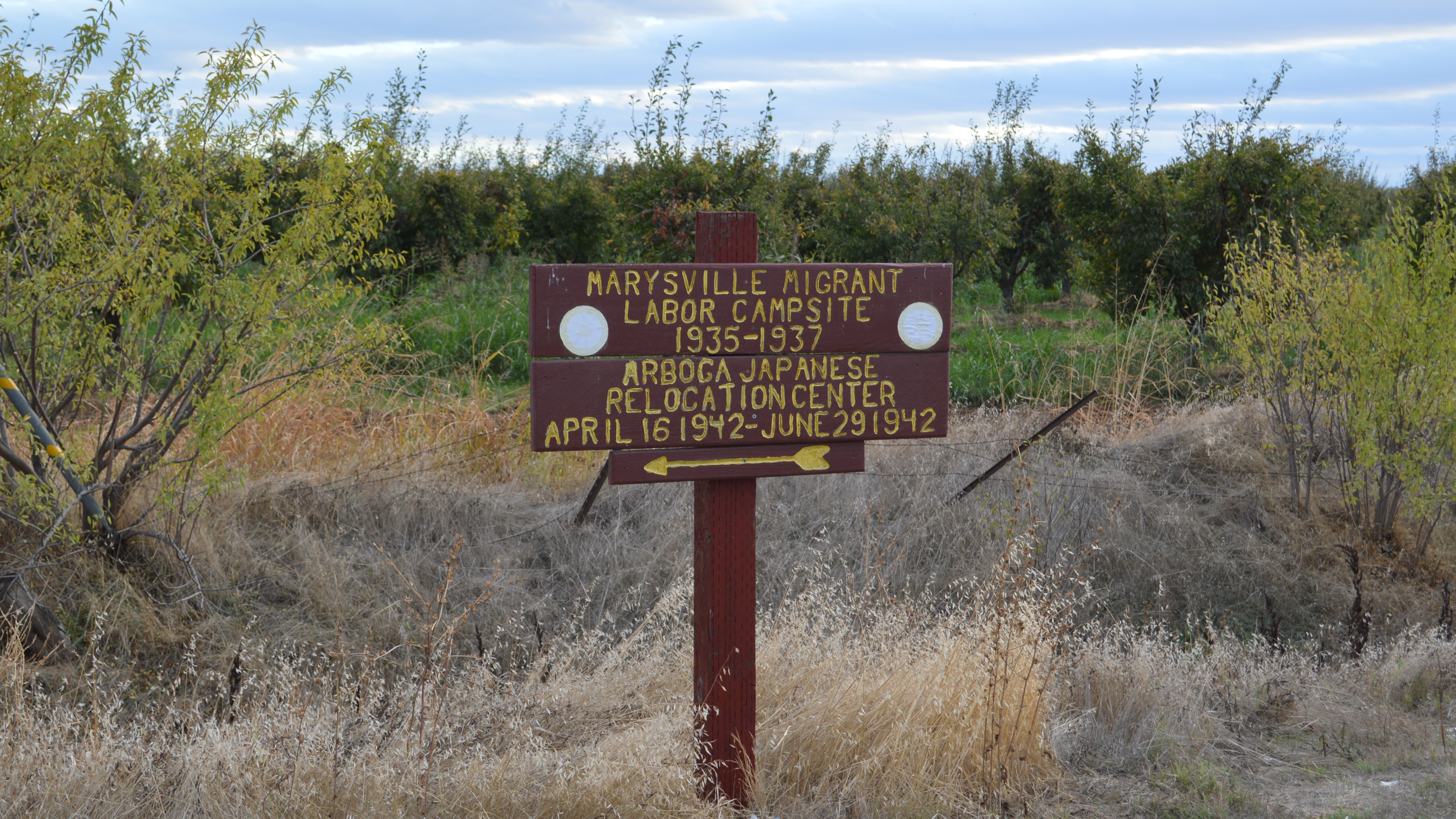
Arboga Assembly Center marker

Arboga is an unincorporated community in Yuba County, California, United States. It is located 3 miles (4.8 km), south of Olivehurst on the Sacramento Northern Railroad, at an elevation of 56 feet (17 m). It was named in 1911 by the pastor of the Mission Covenant Church of Sweden for his hometown of Arboga, Sweden.

During World War II, a temporary detention camp for Japanese Americans evicted from the West Coast by Executive Order 9066 was located here. The Marysville Assembly Center opened on May 8, 1942, and held 2,465 people before closing on June 29, when the residents were transferred to the more permanent and isolated concentration camp at Tule Lake, California.

A post office operated at Arboga from 1912 to 1926.

== Arboga Assembly Center ==
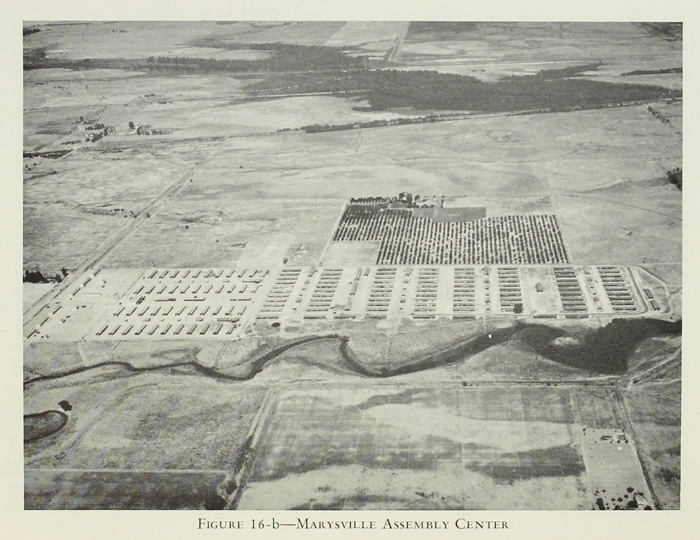
Arboga Assembly Center in 1942

The Marysville Assembly Center was built at a camp for migrant workers at Arboga, eight miles south of Marysville. The camp was also called the Arboga Assembly Center. The center was one of fifteen temporary centers in California. Those of Japanese ancestry were housed at the camp from May 8, 1942, to June 29. The assembly center housed at its peak 2,465 evacuees. Most came from Placer and Sacramento counties. The camp had about 160 buildings, with five dining halls and two infirmaries. Most were moved to the Tule Lake War Relocation Center. In July 1942 the US Army took over the camp for the use of soldiers

The site is a California Historical Landmark number 934.01.

The California Historical Landmark reads:

NO. 934 TEMPORARY DETENTION CAMPS FOR JAPANESE AMERICANS-MARYSVILLE ASSEMBLY CENTER - The temporary detention camps (also known as 'assembly centers') represent the first phase of the mass incarceration of 97,785 Californians of Japanese ancestry during World War II. Pursuant to Executive Order 9066 signed by President Franklin D. Roosevelt on February 19, 1942, thirteen makeshift detention facilities were constructed at various California racetracks, fairgrounds, and labor camps. These facilities were intended to confine Japanese Americans until more permanent concentration camps, such as those at Manzanar and Tule Lake in California, could be built in isolated areas of the country. Beginning on March 30, 1942, all native-born Americans and long-time legal residents of Japanese ancestry living in California were ordered to surrender themselves for detention.

== See also ==
- California Historical Landmarks in Yuba County, California
