= Ockenden, California =

Unincorporated community in California, United States

Ockenden
- Unincorporated community
- Location in California Ockenden (the United States)
- Coordinates: 37°05′20″N 119°19′03″W
- Country: United States
- State: California
- County: Fresno
- Elevation: 5,568 ft (1,697 m)

Ockenden is an unincorporated community in Fresno County, California, United States. It is located 1.25 miles (2.0 km) south of Shaver Lake Heights, at an elevation of 5568 feet (1697 m).

A post office operated at Ockenden from 1893 to 1918. The name commemorates Thomas J. Ockenden, its first postmaster.

Bretz Mill operated one mile to the east on Pine Ridge. Established by Iowan Joseph Bretz in the 1880s, it produced millions of board feet and manufactured posts, shakes and shingles.
