= Woodleaf, Yuba County, California =

Unincorporated community in California, United States

Woodleaf
- Unincorporated community
- Location in California Woodleaf (the United States)
- Coordinates: 39°31′03″N 121°11′30″W
- Country: United States
- State: California
- County: Yuba
- Elevation: 3,133 ft (955 m)

Woodleaf (formerly, Barker House, Barker Ranch, Barker's Ranch, and Woodville) is an unincorporated community in Yuba County, California, United States. It is located 2.5 miles (4.0 km) northeast of Challenge, at an elevation of 3133 feet (955 m).

A post office operated at Woodleaf from 1898 to 1971, with a closure from 1945 to 1947. The name Barker House refers to Charles Barker, who settled the site in 1850. The name was later changed to Woodville, in honor of James Wood, who bought the property in 1858. Wood built a brick hotel with mahogany and velvet interior finishings, where stagecoaches between Oroville and Quincy would stop for the night.

Young Life operates a camp in Woodleaf.
