= Smartsville, California =

Smartsville Smartville (former name)
- Census-designated place
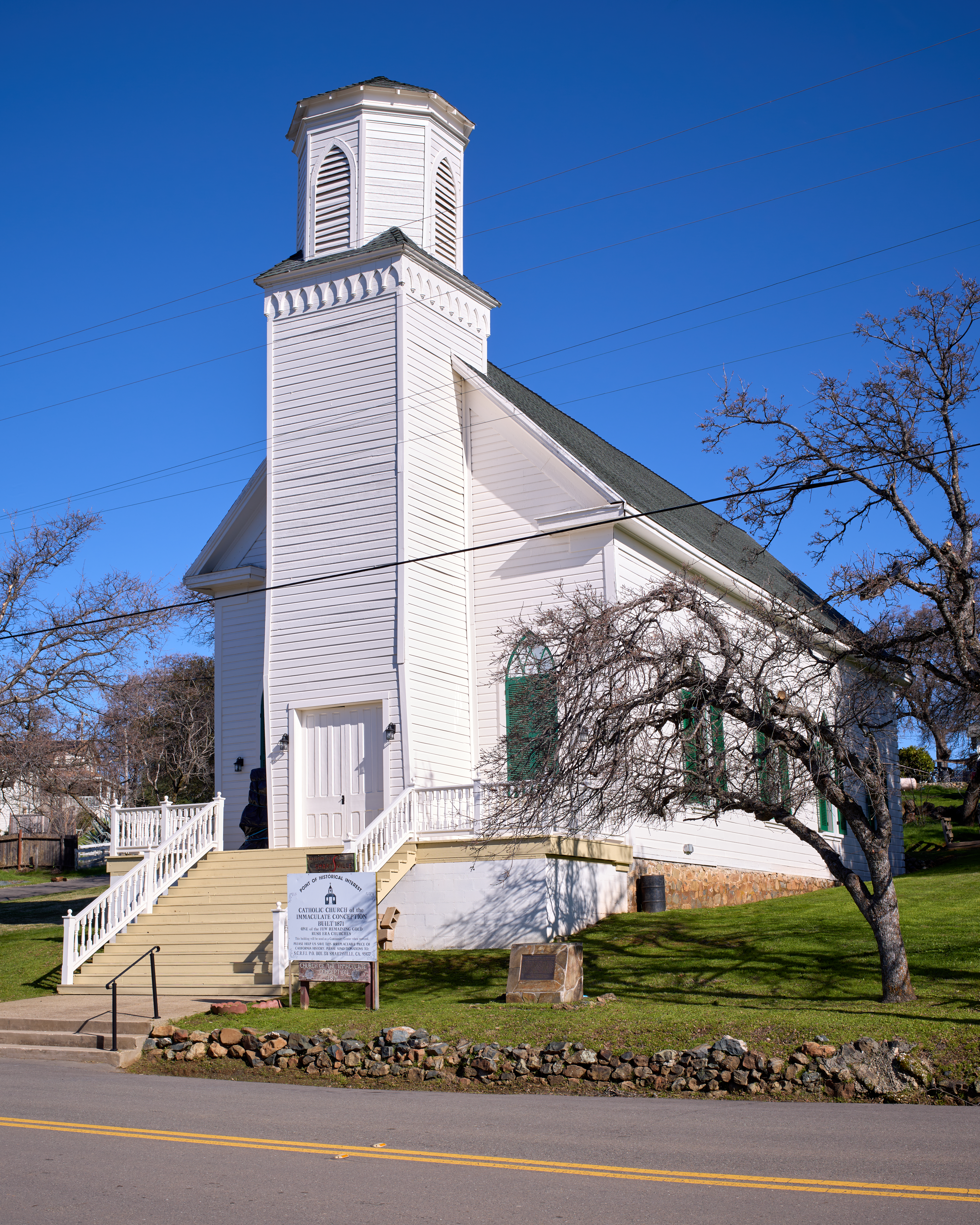
- Church of the Immaculate Conception (2025)

- Location in California
- Coordinates: 39°12′27″N 121°17′55″W
- Country: United States
- State: California
- County: Yuba

Area
  - Total: 0.717 sq mi (1.857 km^{2})
  - Land: 0.717 sq mi (1.857 km^{2})
  - Water: 0 sq mi (0 km^{2}) 0%
- Elevation: 669 ft (204 m)

Population (2020)
  - Total: 185
  - Density: 258/sq mi (99.6/km^{2})
- Time zone: UTC-8 (Pacific (PST))
  - Summer (DST): UTC-7 (PDT)
- ZIP code: 95977
- Area code: 530
- GNIS feature IDs: 1659684; 2628789

California Historical Landmark
- Reference no.: 321

Smartsville is a census-designated place in Yuba County, California, United States, in the foothills of the Sierra Nevada. It is one of the many historic towns in California's gold country, and is today a California Historical Landmark. Located at an altitude of 669 feet (204 m), Smartsville lies about 15 miles (24 km) east-northeast of Marysville, along State Route 20. The population was 185 at the 2020 census.

== History ==
Smartsville is named for James Smart, a local hotel proprietor during the days of the Gold Rush. In the spring of 1856, Smart built a hotel.

Extensive placer mining tailings remain throughout the area.

A post office was opened at Smartsville in 1865. Due to a ruling by the U.S. Post Office Department (now the U.S. Postal Service), Smartsville became Smartville in 1909; this change was strengthened by a similar ruling by the United States Board on Geographic Names in 1947. In August 2008, after petitions from residents to restore the original name, the Board on Geographic Names ruled in favor of the form "Smartsville". The town and name change were featured in an episode of California's Gold with Huell Howser.

The Smartville Cemetery is a historic cemetery.

== Geology ==
Smartsville gave its name to the Smartville Block, a co-extensive oceanic geologic terrane formed by plate tectonics in the western foothills of the central Sierra Nevada and west into the Central Valley. The presence of gold in the Mother Lode Gold Country was found to coincide with the suture line of the Smartville Block terrane and the North American Plate.

== Geography ==
According to the United States Census Bureau, the CDP covers an area of 0.7 square mile (1.9 km^{2}), all land.

=== Climate ===
According to the Köppen Climate Classification system, Smartsville has a warm-summer Mediterranean climate, abbreviated "Csa" on climate maps.

== Demographics ==
Historical population
Census	Pop.	Note	%±
2010	177		—
2020	185		4.5%
U.S. Decennial Census; 1860–1870 1880-1890; 1900 1910 1920; 1930 1940 1950; 1960 1970 1980; 1990 2000 2010; 2020

Smartsville first appeared as a census designated place in the 2010 U.S. census.

The 2020 United States census reported that Smartsville had a population of 185. The population density was 258.0 inhabitants per square mile (99.6/km^{2}). The racial makeup of Smartsville was 145 (78.4%) White, 2 (1.1%) African American, 0 (0.0%) Native American, 9 (4.9%) Asian, 0 (0.0%) Pacific Islander, 6 (3.2%) from other races, and 23 (12.4%) from two or more races. Hispanic or Latino of any race were 10 persons (5.4%).

The whole population lived in households. There were 72 households, out of which 24 (33.3%) had children under the age of 18 living in them, 43 (59.7%) were married-couple households, 6 (8.3%) were cohabiting couple households, 7 (9.7%) had a female householder with no partner present, and 16 (22.2%) had a male householder with no partner present. 12 households (16.7%) were one person, and 7 (9.7%) were one person aged 65 or older. The average household size was 2.57. There were 53 families (73.6% of all households).

The age distribution was 38 people (20.5%) under the age of 18, 15 people (8.1%) aged 18 to 24, 40 people (21.6%) aged 25 to 44, 63 people (34.1%) aged 45 to 64, and 29 people (15.7%) who were 65 years of age or older. The median age was 44.8 years. There were 93 males and 92 females.

There were 72 housing units at an average density of 100.4 units per square mile (38.8 units/km^{2}), which were all occupied, 62 (86.1%) by homeowners, and 10 (13.9%) by renters.

== See also ==
- California Historical Landmarks in Yuba County, California
- Timbuctoo, California
