= Strawberry Valley, California =

Unincorporated community in California, United States

Strawberry Valley
- Unincorporated community
- Location in California Strawberry Valley (the United States)
- Coordinates: 39°33′51″N 121°06′25″W
- Country: United States
- State: California
- County: Yuba
- Elevation: 3,757 ft (1,145 m)
- ZIP code: 95981
- Area code: 530

Strawberry Valley is an unincorporated community in Yuba County, California, United States. It is located 8 miles (13 km) northeast of Challenge, at an elevation of 3757 feet (1145 m).

A post office opened in Strawberry Valley in 1855. The origin of the name has two competing lines: either from wild strawberries found at the site or from two early settlers, Mr. Straw and Mr. Berry.

== Climate ==
According to the Köppen Climate Classification system, Strawberry Valley has a hot-summer mediterranean climate, abbreviated "Csa" on climate maps. The hottest temperature recorded in Strawberry Valley was 105 °F (40.6 °C) on September 8–9, 2022, while the coldest temperature recorded was 4 °F (−15.6 °C) on December 21, 1990.

Climate data for Strawberry Valley, California, 1991–2020 normals, extremes 1948–present
Month	Jan	Feb	Mar	Apr	May	Jun	Jul	Aug	Sep	Oct	Nov	Dec	Year
Record high °F (°C)	79 (26)	77 (25)	80 (27)	86 (30)	94 (34)	101 (38)	106 (41)	102 (39)	105 (41)	95 (35)	86 (30)	76 (24)	106 (41)
Mean maximum °F (°C)	66.1 (18.9)	66.0 (18.9)	69.9 (21.1)	76.2 (24.6)	82.4 (28.0)	89.8 (32.1)	93.4 (34.1)	93.5 (34.2)	91.3 (32.9)	84.4 (29.1)	73.8 (23.2)	65.3 (18.5)	95.9 (35.5)
Mean daily maximum °F (°C)	51.0 (10.6)	51.4 (10.8)	54.4 (12.4)	59.1 (15.1)	67.7 (19.8)	76.6 (24.8)	84.5 (29.2)	84.6 (29.2)	80.3 (26.8)	70.0 (21.1)	57.3 (14.1)	50.1 (10.1)	65.6 (18.7)
Daily mean °F (°C)	40.7 (4.8)	40.9 (4.9)	43.4 (6.3)	47.1 (8.4)	54.7 (12.6)	62.2 (16.8)	68.6 (20.3)	68.0 (20.0)	64.1 (17.8)	55.4 (13.0)	45.7 (7.6)	40.1 (4.5)	52.6 (11.4)
Mean daily minimum °F (°C)	30.3 (−0.9)	30.4 (−0.9)	32.3 (0.2)	35.2 (1.8)	41.7 (5.4)	47.8 (8.8)	52.6 (11.4)	51.4 (10.8)	47.9 (8.8)	40.9 (4.9)	34.1 (1.2)	30.1 (−1.1)	39.6 (4.2)
Mean minimum °F (°C)	21.0 (−6.1)	21.5 (−5.8)	24.0 (−4.4)	26.1 (−3.3)	31.9 (−0.1)	37.2 (2.9)	45.1 (7.3)	44.7 (7.1)	38.4 (3.6)	31.4 (−0.3)	25.0 (−3.9)	20.3 (−6.5)	16.4 (−8.7)
Record low °F (°C)	7 (−14)	5 (−15)	12 (−11)	17 (−8)	22 (−6)	25 (−4)	34 (1)	36 (2)	31 (−1)	21 (−6)	15 (−9)	4 (−16)	4 (−16)
Average precipitation inches (mm)	14.69 (373)	13.71 (348)	12.83 (326)	6.39 (162)	4.00 (102)	1.23 (31)	0.02 (0.51)	0.20 (5.1)	0.50 (13)	4.10 (104)	8.60 (218)	16.25 (413)	82.52 (2,095.61)
Average snowfall inches (cm)	17.7 (45)	19.4 (49)	17.1 (43)	8.1 (21)	0.6 (1.5)	0.0 (0.0)	0.0 (0.0)	0.0 (0.0)	0.0 (0.0)	0.5 (1.3)	3.5 (8.9)	15.1 (38)	82.0 (208)
Average precipitation days (≥ 0.01 in)	13.1	12.0	11.5	9.4	7.2	2.6	0.5	0.8	2.0	5.0	9.0	12.3	85.4
Average snowy days (≥ 0.1 in)	4.5	4.5	3.7	2.5	0.4	0.0	0.0	0.0	0.0	0.2	1.3	4.0	21.1
Source 1: NOAA
Source 2: National Weather Service
