= Camptonville, California =

- Census-designated place
- Location of Camptonville in Yuba County, California.

- Location in California
- Coordinates: 39°27′07″N 121°02′55″W
- Country: United States
- State: California
- County: Yuba

Area
  - Total: 0.86 sq mi (2.22 km^{2})
  - Land: 0.86 sq mi (2.22 km^{2})
  - Water: 0 sq mi (0.00 km^{2}) 0%
- Elevation: 2,825 ft (861 m)

Population (2020)
  - Total: 158
  - Density: 184.2/sq mi (71.13/km^{2})
- Time zone: UTC-8 (Pacific (PST))
  - Summer (DST): UTC-7 (PDT)
- ZIP Code: 95922
- Area codes: 530/837
- GNIS feature IDs: 1658208; 2628715

Camptonville (formerly Comptonville and Gold Ridge) is a small town and census-designated place (CDP) located in northeastern Yuba County, California, United States. The town is located 36 miles (58 km) northeast of Marysville, off Highway 49 between Downieville and Nevada City. It is located on a ridge between the North Fork and Middle Fork of the Yuba River, not far from New Bullards Bar Dam Reservoir. Camptonville lies at an elevation of 2825 feet (861 m). The population was 158 at the 2020 census.

== History ==
Gold was discovered here in 1850, and the place became known as Gold Ridge. The name was changed to Camptonville in 1854 when the first post office opened. The name honors Robert Campton, the town blacksmith.

It was a significant community in the California Gold Rush era and a stopping point for travelers and freight haulers along Henness Pass Road, a major route over the Sierra Nevada via Henness Pass in the 1850s and 1860s. A plaque in Camptonville says the roaring town had over fifty saloons had brothels and even a bowling alley at one time. However, by 1863 William H. Brewer passed through Camptonville and described it in his journal as follows:

September 10 we started on our way--first to Nevada [City], a few miles, a fine town in a rich mining region, then to San Juan North (there are several other San Juans in the state), then to Camptonville, a miserable, dilapidated town, but very picturesquely located, with immense hydraulic diggings about. The amount of soil sluiced away in this way seems incredible. Bluffs sixty to a hundred feet thick have been washed away for hundreds of acres together. But they were not rich, the gold has “stopped,” the town is dilapidated--but we had to pay big prices nevertheless.

As gold mining in the area waned, the local economy depended on the timber industry. When Sierra Mountain Mills closed in 1994 putting 75 people out of work, many people moved away. Today the town includes a post office, Camptonville Elementary School; a monument to the Pelton wheel, the inventor of which lived here in the 1860s; and the original Mayo Saloon, currently home to a restaurant and bar, and the Yuba River Ranger District Office of the Tahoe National Forest, which is also the headquarters of the Tahoe Hotshots fire crew.

== Geography ==
According to the United States Census Bureau, the CDP covers an area of 0.9 square mile (2.2 km^{2}), all land.

=== Climate ===
According to the Köppen Climate Classification system, Camptonville has a warm-summer Mediterranean climate, abbreviated "Csa" on climate maps.

== Demographics ==
Historical population
Census	Pop.	Note	%±
2010	158		—
2020	158		0.0%
U.S. Decennial Census; 1860–1870 1880-1890; 1900 1910 1920; 1930 1940 1950; 1960 1970 1980; 1990 2000 2010; 2020

Camptonville first appeared as a census designated place in the 2010 U.S. census.

=== 2020 census ===
As of the 2020 census, Camptonville had a population of 158. The population density was 184.1 inhabitants per square mile (71.1/km^{2}). The median age was 47.3 years. The age distribution was 34 people (21.5%) under the age of 18, 9 people (5.7%) aged 18 to 24, 31 people (19.6%) aged 25 to 44, 60 people (38.0%) aged 45 to 64, and 24 people (15.2%) who were 65 years of age or older. There were 78 males and 80 females; for every 100 females there were 97.5 males, and for every 100 females age 18 and over there were 106.7 males age 18 and over.

0.0% of residents lived in urban areas, while 100.0% lived in rural areas.

The census reported that 150 people (94.9% of the population) lived in households, 8 (5.1%) lived in non-institutionalized group quarters, and no one was institutionalized.

There were 53 households, out of which 21 (39.6%) had children under the age of 18 living in them, 15 (28.3%) were married-couple households, 6 (11.3%) were cohabiting couple households, 14 (26.4%) had a female householder with no partner present, and 18 (34.0%) had a male householder with no partner present. 20 households (37.7%) were one person, and 13 (24.5%) were one person aged 65 or older. The average household size was 2.83. There were 28 families (52.8% of all households).

There were 72 housing units at an average density of 83.9 units per square mile (32.4 units/km^{2}), of which 53 (73.6%) were occupied. Of these, 27 (50.9%) were owner-occupied, and 26 (49.1%) were occupied by renters. The homeowner vacancy rate was 3.6% and the rental vacancy rate was 23.5%.

Racial composition as of the 2020 census
Race	Number	Percent
White	121	76.6%
Black or African American	4	2.5%
American Indian and Alaska Native	1	0.6%
Asian	0	0.0%
Native Hawaiian and Other Pacific Islander	5	3.2%
Some other race	3	1.9%
Two or more races	24	15.2%
Hispanic or Latino (of any race)	12	7.6%
