= Oro Loma, California =

Unincorporated community in California, United States

Oro Loma
- Unincorporated community
- Location in California Oro Loma (the United States)
- Coordinates: 36°53′27″N 120°41′26″W
- Country: United States
- State: California
- County: Fresno
- Elevation: 174 ft (53 m)

Oro Loma (Spanish for "Hill Gold") is an unincorporated community in Fresno County, California, United States. It is located 13 miles (21 km) west of Firebaugh, at an elevation of 174 feet (53 m).

A post office operated at Oro Loma from 1914 to 1929. A public elementary and middle school that operated in Oro Loma at 5609 Russell Avenue was finally closed in 2010; students from the area now attend schools in Dos Palos as part of the Dos Palos Oro Loma Joint Unified School District.
