= Omira, California =

Unincorporated community in California, United States

Omira
- Unincorporated community
- Location in California Omira (the United States)
- Coordinates: 39°58′01″N 120°04′39″W
- Country: United States
- State: California
- County: Lassen
- Elevation: 4,347 ft (1,325 m)

Omira is an unincorporated community in Lassen County, California, United States. It is located on the Western Pacific Railroad, 2.25 miles (3.6 km) west-northwest of Constantia, at an elevation of 4347 feet (1325 m).

A post office operated at Omira from 1910 to 1911 and from 1915 to 1918. The town was named by railroad officials for a woman who promised to build a church there if the town were named for her.

The Omira station closed in 1927.
