= Dobbins, California =

Dobbins
- Census-designated place
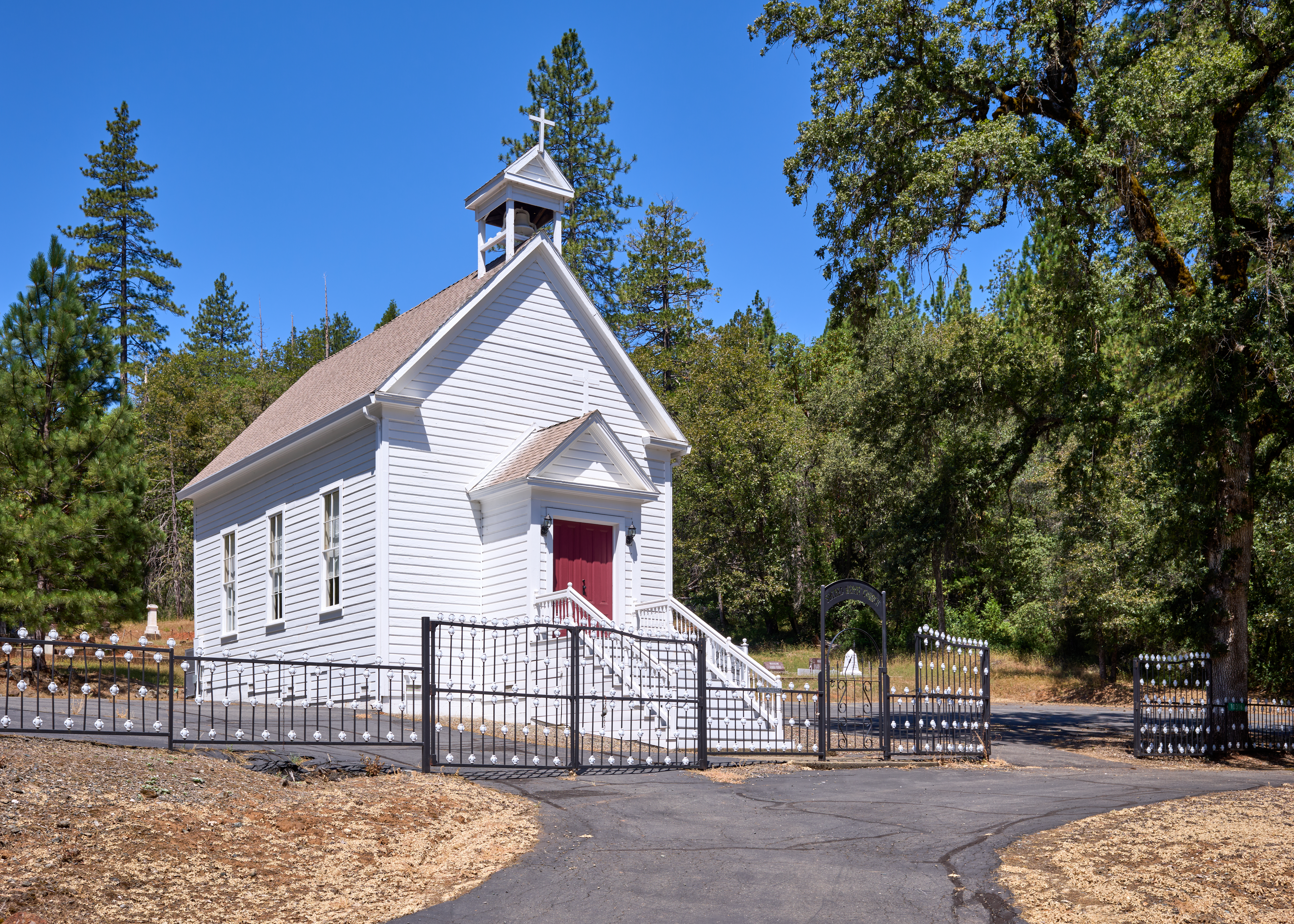
- Sacred Heart Station, a historic Catholic mission church listed as California Historical Resource

- Location of Dobbins in Yuba County, California.

- Location in California
- Coordinates: 39°22′18″N 121°12′22″W
- Country: United States
- State: California
- County: Yuba

Area
  - Total: 7.81 sq mi (20.24 km^{2})
  - Land: 7.74 sq mi (20.05 km^{2})
  - Water: 0.073 sq mi (0.19 km^{2}) 0.92%
- Elevation: 1,742 ft (531 m)

Population (2020)
  - Total: 551
  - Density: 71.2/sq mi (27.48/km^{2})
- Time zone: UTC-8 (Pacific (PST))
  - Summer (DST): UTC-7 (PDT)
- ZIP code: 95935
- Area code: 530
- GNIS feature IDs: 259415; 2582996

Dobbins (formerly, Dobbin, Dobbins Ranche, Dobbins Ranch, and Dobbin's Ranche) is a census-designated place in Yuba County, California, United States.

As of the 2020 census, Dobbins had a population of 551.

== Geography ==
Dobbins lies 26 miles (42 km) northeast of Marysville, at an elevation of 1,742 feet (531 m), in the foothills of the western Sierra Nevada Mountain Range off California Highway 20 and Marysville Road. Dobbins is north of Oregon House and south of Bullards Bar Dam. Dobbins has one post office, one general store, three churches, a Grange Hall, one grade school, one charter school, and Lake Francis Resort.

According to the United States Census Bureau, the CDP covers an area of 7.8 square miles (20.3 km^{2}), of which 99.08% is land and 0.92% is water.

== History ==
The town was settled in 1849, and named for William M. and Mark D. Dobbins, early settlers. Dobbins was not a mining town originally, but a farm area. There were stage station stops, for teamsters' and their wagons, at what was known as Scott Ranch (three miles below Dobbins- Marysville Rd). Dobbins served as a stage stop until the coming of the automobiles.

The first post office was established in 1851 under the name Dobbins Ranche, which was closed in 1854. The post office returned in 1887 and has operated continuously since then.

== Climate ==
According to the Köppen climate classification system, Dobbins has a hot-summer Mediterranean climate, abbreviated "Csa" on climate maps.

The average snowfall is 3.5 inches (89 mm), higher than most of California. February has the highest average snowfall with 1.5 inches (38 mm), followed by January and March with 1 inch (25 mm) average snowfall each.

Climate data for Dobbins (1970-2009)
Month	Jan	Feb	Mar	Apr	May	Jun	Jul	Aug	Sep	Oct	Nov	Dec	Year
Record high °F (°C)	78 (26)	82 (28)	86 (30)	89 (32)	102 (39)	104 (40)	111 (44)	110 (43)	106 (41)	102 (39)	83 (28)	84 (29)	111 (44)
Mean daily maximum °F (°C)	55.7 (13.2)	58.6 (14.8)	62.4 (16.9)	68.0 (20.0)	76.2 (24.6)	84.9 (29.4)	93.0 (33.9)	93.0 (33.9)	87.3 (30.7)	76.5 (24.7)	62.3 (16.8)	55.3 (12.9)	72.8 (22.6)
Mean daily minimum °F (°C)	34.0 (1.1)	35.9 (2.2)	37.9 (3.3)	40.5 (4.7)	46.3 (7.9)	51.5 (10.8)	55.8 (13.2)	54.5 (12.5)	50.5 (10.3)	44.1 (6.7)	37.3 (2.9)	33.5 (0.8)	43.5 (6.4)
Record low °F (°C)	17 (−8)	15 (−9)	21 (−6)	24 (−4)	30 (−1)	34 (1)	42 (6)	41 (5)	35 (2)	22 (−6)	19 (−7)	6 (−14)	6 (−14)
Average precipitation inches (mm)	7.39 (188)	7.53 (191)	7.78 (198)	3.23 (82)	2.32 (59)	0.64 (16)	0.01 (0.25)	0.20 (5.1)	0.80 (20)	3.19 (81)	6.69 (170)	9.13 (232)	48.91 (1,242.35)
Average snowfall inches (cm)	0.5 (1.3)	1.5 (3.8)	0.5 (1.3)	0 (0)	0 (0)	0 (0)	0 (0)	0 (0)	0 (0)	0 (0)	0.1 (0.25)	0.4 (1.0)	3 (7.65)
Average precipitation days	11.3	9.6	10.3	7.3	5.8	1.6	0.2	0.5	2.1	3.8	9.0	10.2	71.7
Source: NOAA

== Education ==
Most students attend high school in Marysville, or in the Sierra County school district.

== Demographics ==
Historical population
Census	Pop.	Note	%±
2010	1,148		—
2020	551		−52.0%
U.S. Decennial Census; 1860–1870 1880-1890; 1900 1910 1920; 1930 1940 1950; 1960 1970 1980; 1990 2000 2010; 2020

Dobbins first appeared as a census designated place in the 2010 U.S. Census.

The 2020 United States census reported that Dobbins had a population of 551. The population density was 71.2 inhabitants per square mile (27.5/km^{2}). The racial makeup of Dobbins was 414 (75.1%) White, 2 (0.4%) African American, 18 (3.3%) Native American, 9 (1.6%) Asian, 1 (0.2%) Pacific Islander, 12 (2.2%) from other races, and 95 (17.2%) from two or more races. Hispanic or Latino of any race were 68 persons (12.3%).

The whole population lived in households. There were 246 households, out of which 50 (20.3%) had children under the age of 18 living in them, 143 (58.1%) were married-couple households, 19 (7.7%) were cohabiting couple households, 42 (17.1%) had a female householder with no partner present, and 42 (17.1%) had a male householder with no partner present. 54 households (22.0%) were one person, and 31 (12.6%) were one person aged 65 or older. The average household size was 2.24. There were 177 families (72.0% of all households).

The age distribution was 92 people (16.7%) under the age of 18, 21 people (3.8%) aged 18 to 24, 108 people (19.6%) aged 25 to 44, 154 people (27.9%) aged 45 to 64, and 176 people (31.9%) who were 65 years of age or older. The median age was 55.9 years. For every 100 females, there were 118.7 males.

There were 286 housing units at an average density of 36.9 units per square mile (14.2 units/km^{2}), of which 246 (86.0%) were occupied. Of these, 224 (91.1%) were owner-occupied, and 22 (8.9%) were occupied by renters.
