= Relief, California =

Unincorporated community in California, United States

Relief Hill Relief
- Unincorporated community
- Location in California Relief Hill (the United States)
- Coordinates: 39°21′41″N 120°51′39″W
- Country: United States
- State: California
- County: Nevada County
- Elevation: 3,947 ft (1,203 m)

Relief Hill (also, Relief) is an unincorporated community in Nevada County, California. Relief Hill is located roughly midway between North Bloomfield and the town of Washington. It lies at an elevation of 3,947 feet (1,203 m). The post office established in 1894 was named Relief, and that name appears on some maps, especially those from around the turn of the nineteenth century. However, the town's inhabitants and most historians called it Relief Hill. The post office was discontinued in 1921.

== History ==
Prior to the Gold Rush, the area was a summer residence for the Southern Maidu Indians. The present Relief Hill Road is believed to be the approximate location of a Maidu trail.

There are two conflicting stories about how Relief Hill got its name. One story is that it is located at the spot where, in 1847, a rescue party met surviving remnants of the Donner Party who expressed their great relief. (Note: This story may have its origins in Waggoner (1931), pp. 347, 351. Waggoner's theory is based on his conclusion that Mule Springs, where the relief party rested, is near Relief Hill, whereas local historians place Mule Springs between the Bear River and Steephollow Creek, more than 10 miles to the south.)

Another story is that in 1853, four miners were prospecting in the area. Having no luck and running out of supplies, they had about given up when one of them found gold, whereupon they expressed their relief. A contemporary resident told this story best in a letter to a local paper. "Some time during the year 1853, four miners, whose names are Taylor, Bonham, Moore and Rogers, (Note: According to Thompson and West, the miners were named Captain Monroe, J. K. Reed, Burnham and Tuttle. According to Patterson, early miners in the area included William Taylor, Robert Moore, G. K. Reed, Captain Monroe, Joseph Burnham, William Turrle and Mr. Rogers.) united their fortunes and set out together upon a prospecting tour through the mountains of Nevada. At a point about three miles south of Snow Tent, in the northern section of the county, our adventurers discovered indications which induced them to commence serious operations. Staking off a small claim near the head of what is now styled Logan's Cañon, and forms the north-eastern boundary of Relief Hill, they applied themselves with untiring energy and patience. For two long weary months they toiled bravely on without reaping any reward. The prospect was gloomy. Finances were getting very low. A few days more, and there was nary red in bank. The last scad had gone for a dozen murphies and a piece of Spanish beef, and now, these too, had 'vamosed the ranch.' The boys were in a dilemma.They were forced to suspend 'internal improvements' or seek a change of venue. Reduced to positive destitution, and heartily sick of 'hope deferred,' they were upon the eve of adopting the alternative when one of the hungry hombres struck the shining lode, and manifested his delight by shouting the word—Relief. Hence, the name of the hill."

The town grew quickly. By 1856, it had a population of 75, two saloons, one store, one butcher shop, one blacksmith shop, two boarding houses and several homes. In 1858, registered voters alone numbered 100.

Early mining often involved digging a coyote hole, essentially sinking a hole into the ground, much like digging a well, and bringing up the dirt and rocks by hand or by a windlass, or tunneling into the side of the hill to follow the gold bearing gravel. Coyoteing and early tunneling were dangerous, since often the shaft was inadequately timbered, and cave-ins were not uncommon. A major one in Relief Hill in 1859 killed two miners and, coupled with a drought, caused the town to decline. By then, other mining camps were developing hydraulic mining, which involves blasting powerful streams of water against hillsides to dislodge gold.

By 1863, with the drought over and the arrival of more mining ditches bringing water from higher elevations at great pressure, hydraulic mining revived Relief Hill. Principal mines were the Blue Gravel, Union, Great Eastern, Relief, Penn Cut and Waukesha. In 1866, Chinese miners found a boulder containing gold then worth almost $7000. The town had a school by then, followed by a church in 1872. In its heyday, the town also boasted a hall at which balls were held, a baseball team and a brass band.

In 1884, a federal court enjoined many aspects of hydraulic mining, finding that the discharges had created a variety of problems for farmers and others living downstream. (Note: Often referred to as the Sawyer decision, it is reported as Woodruff v. North Bloomfield Gravel Mining Co., 18 F. 753 (CCD Cal. 1884)) In Relief Hill, some miners resumed tunneling or drifting while others resumed hydraulicking clandestinely. As one writer puts it: "With an elaborate warning system, including riders on fast horses, and the Ridge Telephone Company's relatively new long-distance line, the miners usually had time to shut down before the inspectors from Sacramento could reach them."

In 1893, the US Congress passed the Caminetti Act which allowed the resumption of hydraulic mining under license if the debris could be retained in localized dams. How much that helped Relief Hill is not clear. By the early 1900s, the town was in decline. Some residents abandoned their homes or sold them to the mining companies. Other residents moved a short distance north, close to what is now Relief Hill Road. With the old town largely abandoned, some residents started mining in the old town site, so that: "husbands, crazed with gold fever, washed the foundations from under their homes, and watched the houses fall into the river, while the wives and children ran from their homes, fleeing a certain death."

One way or another, mining continued in Relief Hill into the 1950s. By the 1960s, the old townsite was totally deserted. Not much but the cemetery remains.
