= Timbuctoo, California =

Unincorporated community in California, United States

Timbuctoo
- Unincorporated community
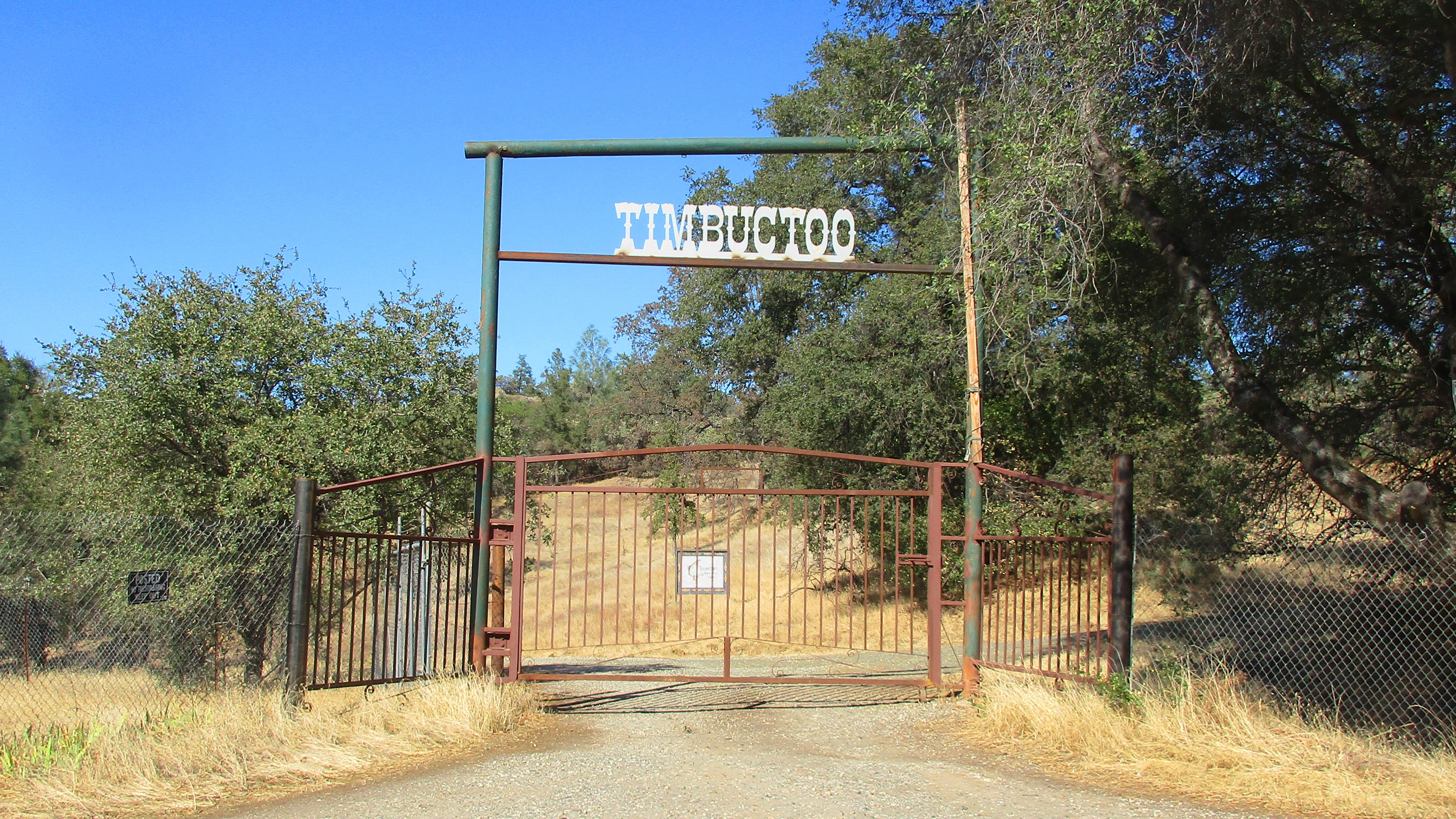
- Timbuctoo gate.

- Location in California Timbuctoo (the United States)
- Coordinates: 39°13′01″N 121°19′07″W
- Country: United States
- State: California
- County: Yuba
- Elevation: 397 ft (121 m)

California Historical Landmark
- Reference no.: 320

Timbuctoo is an unincorporated community in Yuba County, California, United States. It lies northwest of Smartsville, at an elevation of 397 feet (121 m).

== History ==
Timbuctoo was once the largest town in eastern Yuba County. Situated strategically on the Yuba River near its gold-bearing sandbars, yet perched high enough into the river's surrounding hills to escape flood risk, the town enjoyed its heyday in the 1850s. Founded by the gold miners working the nearby river placer deposits, the town enjoyed further success with the introduction of hydraulic mining in 1854. Unlike many of the mining camps that amounted to little more than tent shantytowns, the wealth flowing from Timbuctoo allowed for the construction of permanent buildings of wood and brick. Aside from the usual stores and businesses, the town's amenities included a Wells Fargo office, saloons, a church, hotels and a theater. The town was founded in 1855.

A post office opened in 1858.

== Origins of the name ==
Legend has it that the unusual name was coined by an African American miner who panned in the area. He was said to have been from the region of Timbuktu, in Mali, although it is unclear whether or not the town was named by him or after him. Under California law he was a free man. In New York versions of the tale, he was either an escaped or freed slave, and was named for one of two other older towns of the same name in New York and New Jersey according to the Gold Rush myth they invented.

== Decline ==
Hydraulic mining benefited California in three ways; it filled the state coffers, lined the pockets of mining corporations and fueled the boom of the mountain mining towns. Downstream, it was another story. Tons of sediment and detritus from the mining operations destroyed farmland and riparian land. It also changed the course of rivers in the Sacramento Valley. Once out of the steep slopes of the hills and mountains, the river water in the valley ran slower, allowing the debris to settle. Silt began to accumulate on the bottom of the Yuba and Feather rivers, making the channels significantly more shallow, which threatened to end the vital riverboat traffic and subsequent trade with Sacramento and San Francisco. Citizens of the downstream towns and cities such as Marysville became alarmed at the increased risk of flooding the shoaling of the rivers presented. Eventually a system of levees would enclose Marysville to combat the new threat, permanently limiting the growth of the city. Besides threatening urban communities, valuable farmland became buried under the mining debris. Farmers began to see more frequent and devastating flood losses, and soon a legal battle erupted to stop hydraulic mining once and for all.

Ruling in favor of the farmers, the United States District Court in San Francisco effectively put an end to hydraulic mining in 1884. By the time the United States Congress passed an act allowing hydraulic mining to recommence (albeit only after sediment retention dams were erected), it was too late. It was 1893; the glory days when a single miner could make his fortune, or at least support himself with pick and pan, were gone. The hydraulic mining companies had seen their flume infrastructure washed away in a severe flood in 1891, and now were limited in where they could resume. Lacking an economic foundation, the town was abandoned.

The post office closed in 1883.

== Today ==
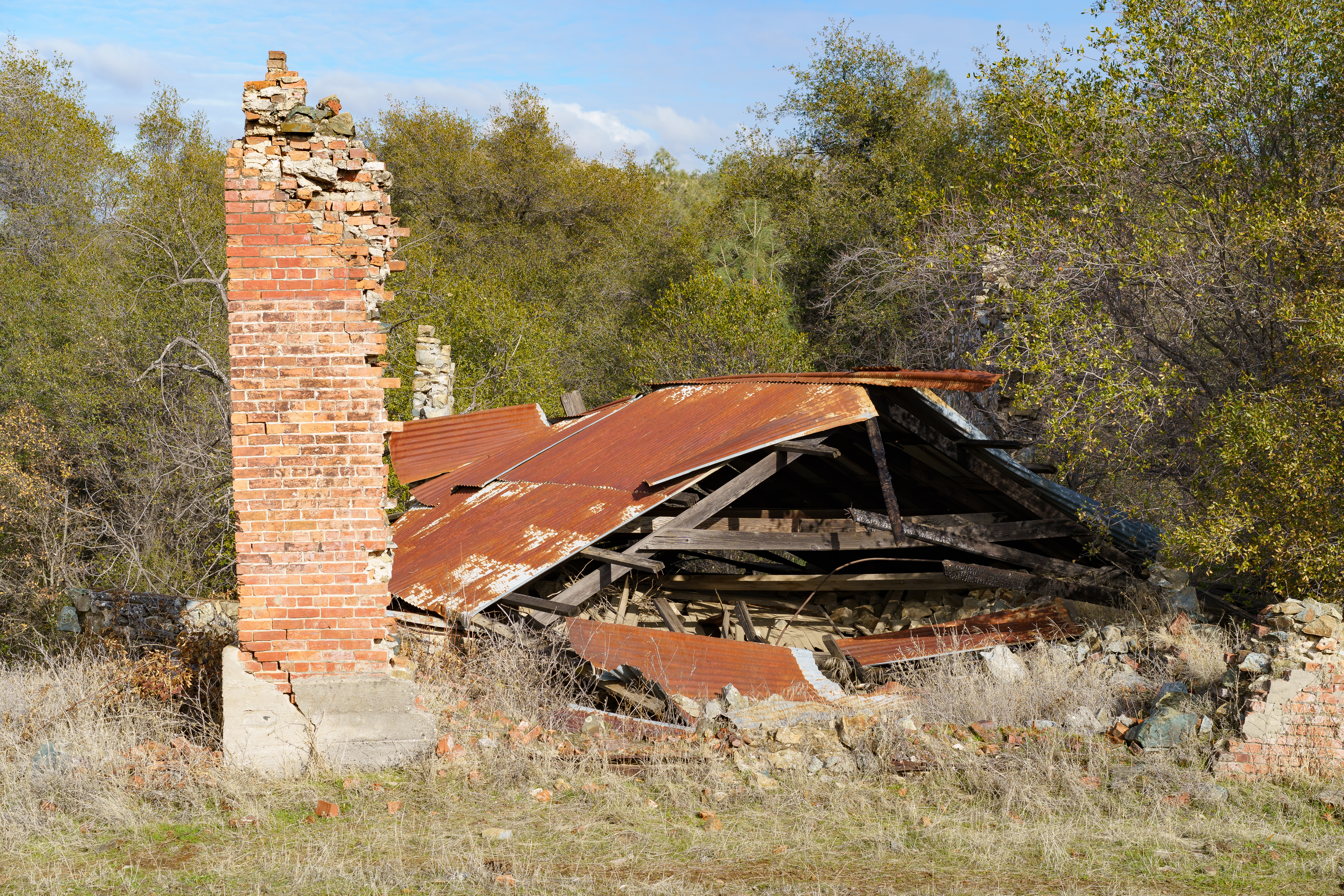
Stewart Brothers/Wells Fargo ruins.

Timbuctoo is registered as a California Historical Landmark. While the general area of the "Timbuctoo Diggings" is inhabited, today it is considered by many to be a ghost town. The town site is accessed by the much-neglected Timbuctoo Road, which crosses a stream gulch by bridge in two places, one east and one west of town, meandering in a loop back to Highway 20. The western bridge buckled at the west end in 2008 and was unusable until replaced in 2014. Just to the east of the western bridge lies the ruins of the town's last structure: the Stewart Brothers Store/Wells Fargo Office, erected in 1855. Five miles west of the town on Highway 20 stands a historical marker. According to the 5 Miles Marker, the structure was restored in 1928. However, the plaque that once adorned the facade of the store/Wells Fargo office stated that it was restored in 1925. Whatever the case, the building has since been destroyed. Rumors that hoards of gold were still stored within the structure apparently motivated looters to tear down the walls in search of treasure. Now collapsed, its brick and stone remains, topped by rusty pieces of the tin roof, can be seen behind a fence erected to protect it from further vandalism.

The Timbuctoo Cemetery is still in use, and dates back to 1855. It holds approximately 89 graves, most from the late 1800s and the early 20th century. It is also fenced and gated to ward off vandals.

Timbuctoo was once a minor tourist attraction, enjoying public awareness of its historical significance and widespread enthusiasm for preservation. Despite all of these factors in its favor, Timbuctoo remains today an example of a failed preservation effort.

== See also ==
- List of ghost towns in California

== Additional sources ==
- Varney, Philip (2001). Ghost Towns of Northern California. St. Paul, MN: Voyageur Press. ISBN 978-0-89658-442-6.
