= Oro Fino, California =

Unincorporated community in California, United States

Coordinates: 41°34′49″N 122°55′17″W

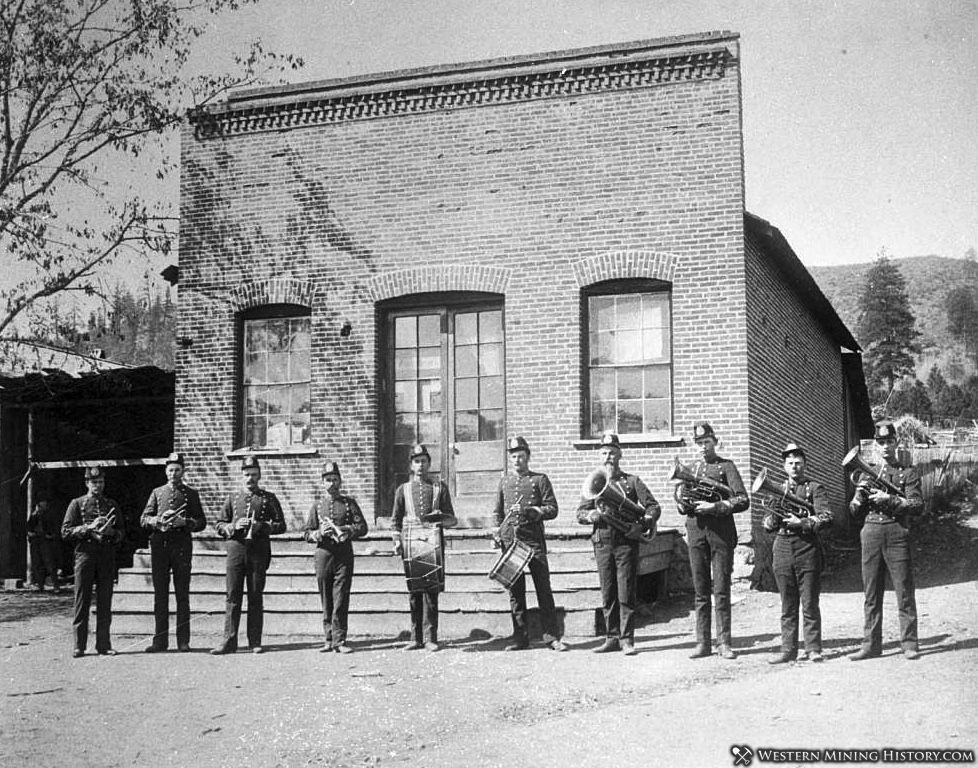
Oro Fino, brass band and brick building ca 1889

Oro Fino (Spanish for "Fine Gold") is a populated place, formerly a gold mining town near Fort Jones in the 1850s, in unincorporated Siskiyou County, California, United States. Its site lies at an elevation of 2,871 ft (875 m). Oro Fino addresses are all within Fort Jones.
