= Challenge, California =

Unincorporated community in California, United States

Challenge
- Unincorporated community
- Location in California Challenge (the United States)
- Coordinates: 39°29′15″N 121°13′25″W
- Country: United States
- State: California
- County: Yuba
- Elevation: 2,595 ft (791 m)
- ZIP code: 95925
- Area code: 530

Challenge (formerly Challenge Mills) is an unincorporated community in Yuba County, California, United States. It is located on Dry Creek, 30 miles (48 km) northeast of Marysville.

Challenge was once the terminus of a narrow-gauge logging railroad that hauled timber to the Beanville mill.

A post office opened at Challenge in 1895.

== Climate ==
According to the Köppen Climate Classification system, Challenge has a warm-summer Mediterranean climate, abbreviated "Csa" on climate maps.

Climate data for Challenge, California (1981–2010)
| Month | Jan | Feb | Mar | Apr | May | Jun | Jul | Aug | Sep | Oct | Nov | Dec | Year |
|---|---|---|---|---|---|---|---|---|---|---|---|---|---|
| Mean daily maximum °F (°C) | 52 (11) | 54 (12) | 58 (14) | 63 (17) | 71 (22) | 81 (27) | 90 (32) | 89 (32) | 84 (29) | 73 (23) | 59 (15) | 51 (11) | 69 (20) |
| Mean daily minimum °F (°C) | 35 (2) | 35 (2) | 37 (3) | 40 (4) | 47 (8) | 54 (12) | 61 (16) | 60 (16) | 55 (13) | 47 (8) | 39 (4) | 34 (1) | 45 (7) |
| Average precipitation inches (mm) | 12.36 (314) | 10.95 (278) | 9.91 (252) | 4.70 (119) | 2.12 (54) | 0.71 (18) | 0.06 (1.5) | 0.11 (2.8) | 0.81 (21) | 3.86 (98) | 8.18 (208) | 11.40 (290) | 65.17 (1,656.3) |
| Average snowfall inches (cm) | 4.1 (10) | 3.9 (9.9) | 3.0 (7.6) | 0.4 (1.0) | 0.0 (0.0) | 0.0 (0.0) | 0.0 (0.0) | 0.0 (0.0) | 0.0 (0.0) | 0.0 (0.0) | 0.4 (1.0) | 1.6 (4.1) | 13.4 (33.6) |
Source: U.S.ClimateData
