= Yuba County, California =

County in California, United States

Coordinates: 39.27°N 121.35°W

County of Yuba
- County
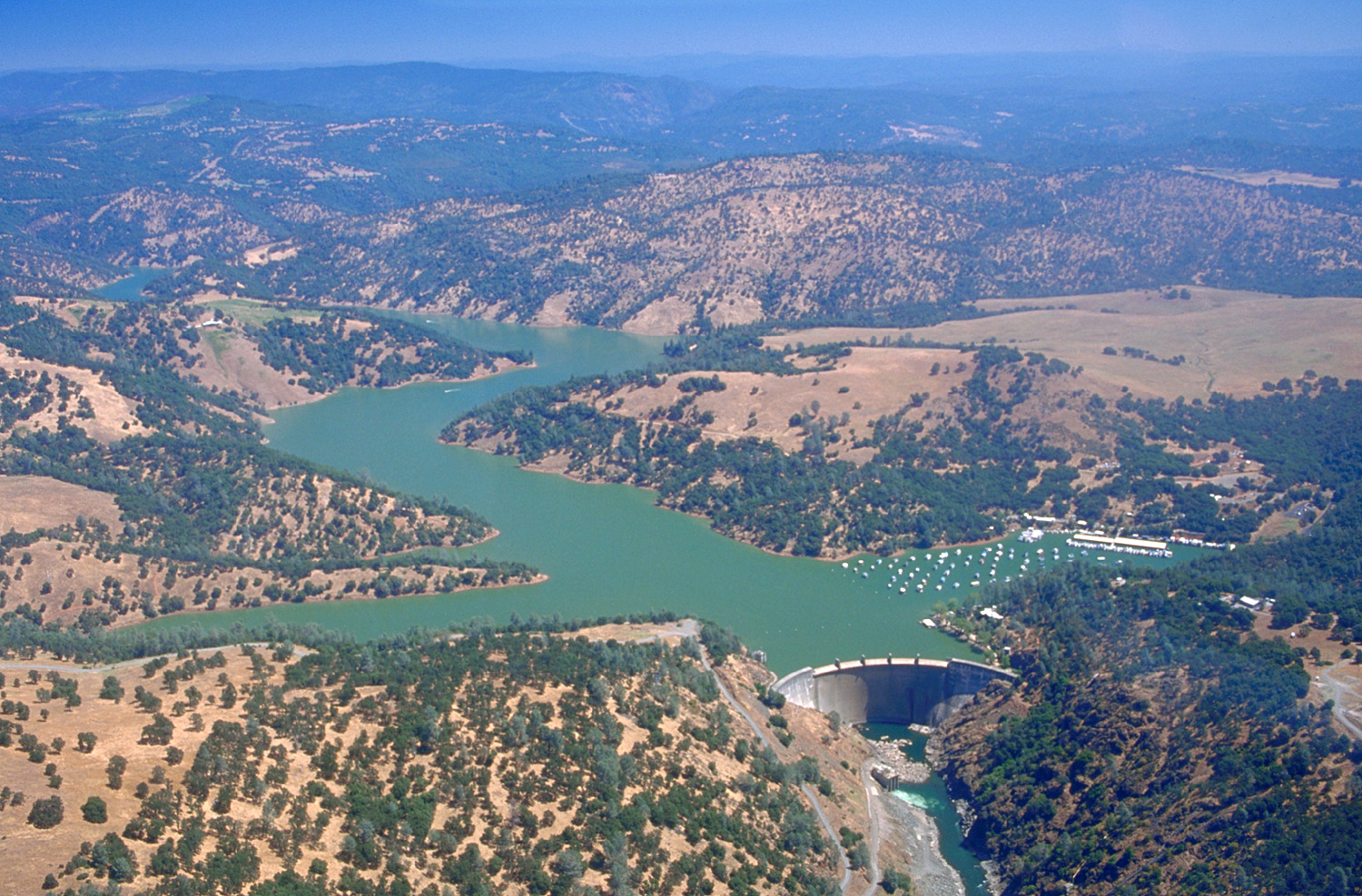
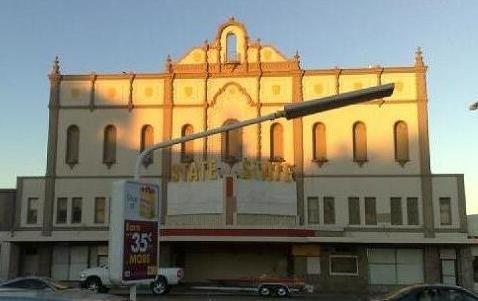
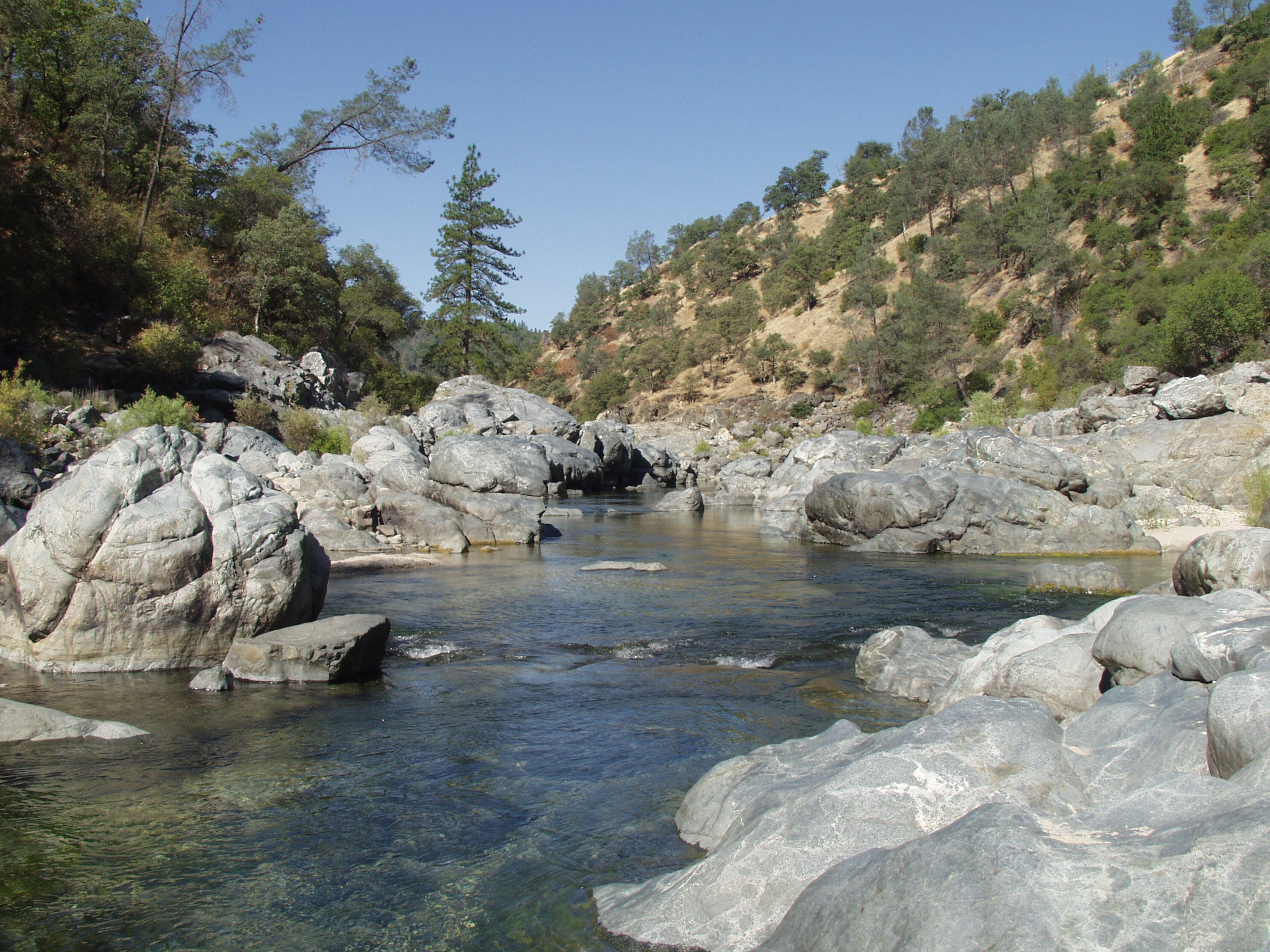
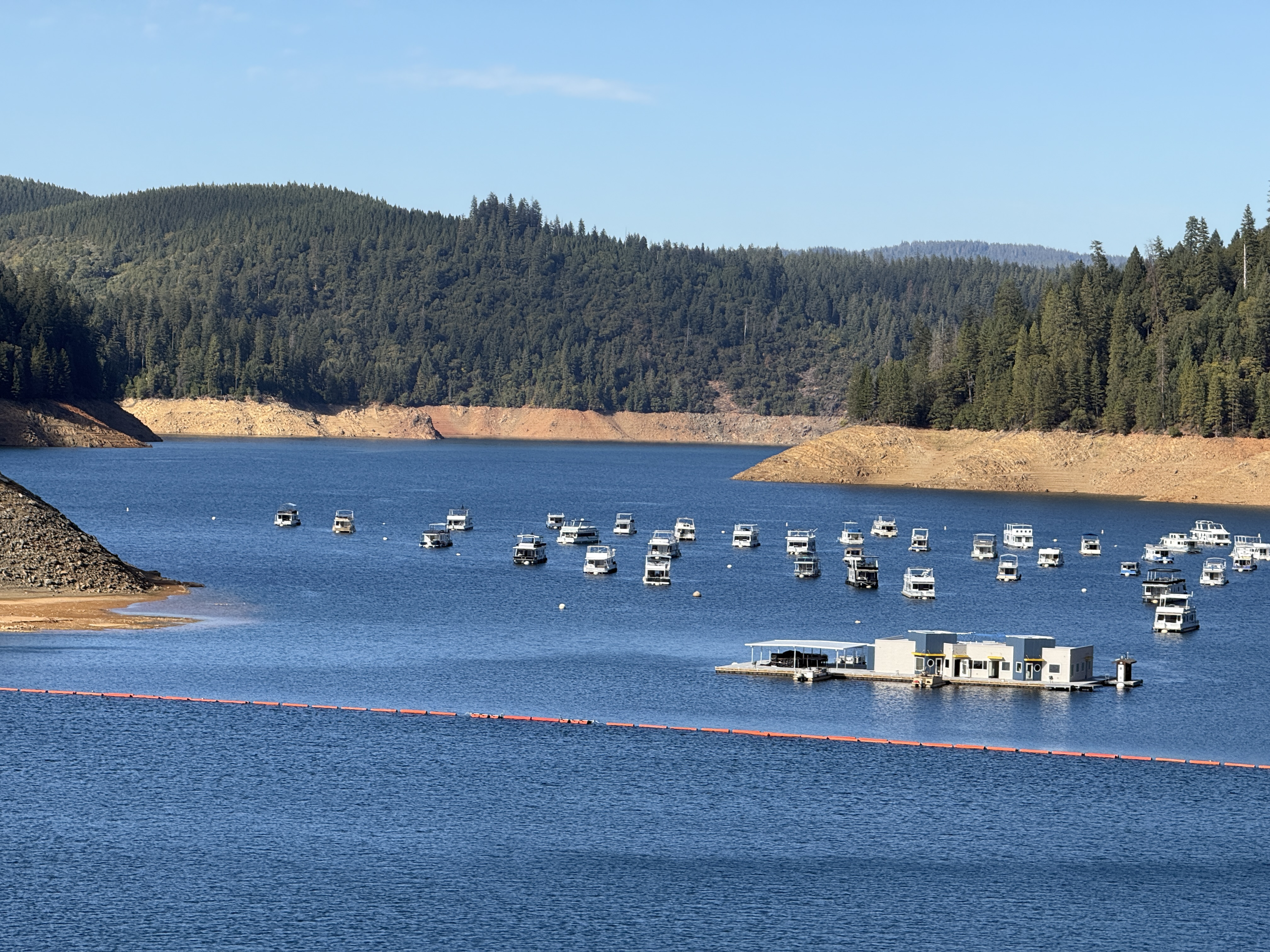
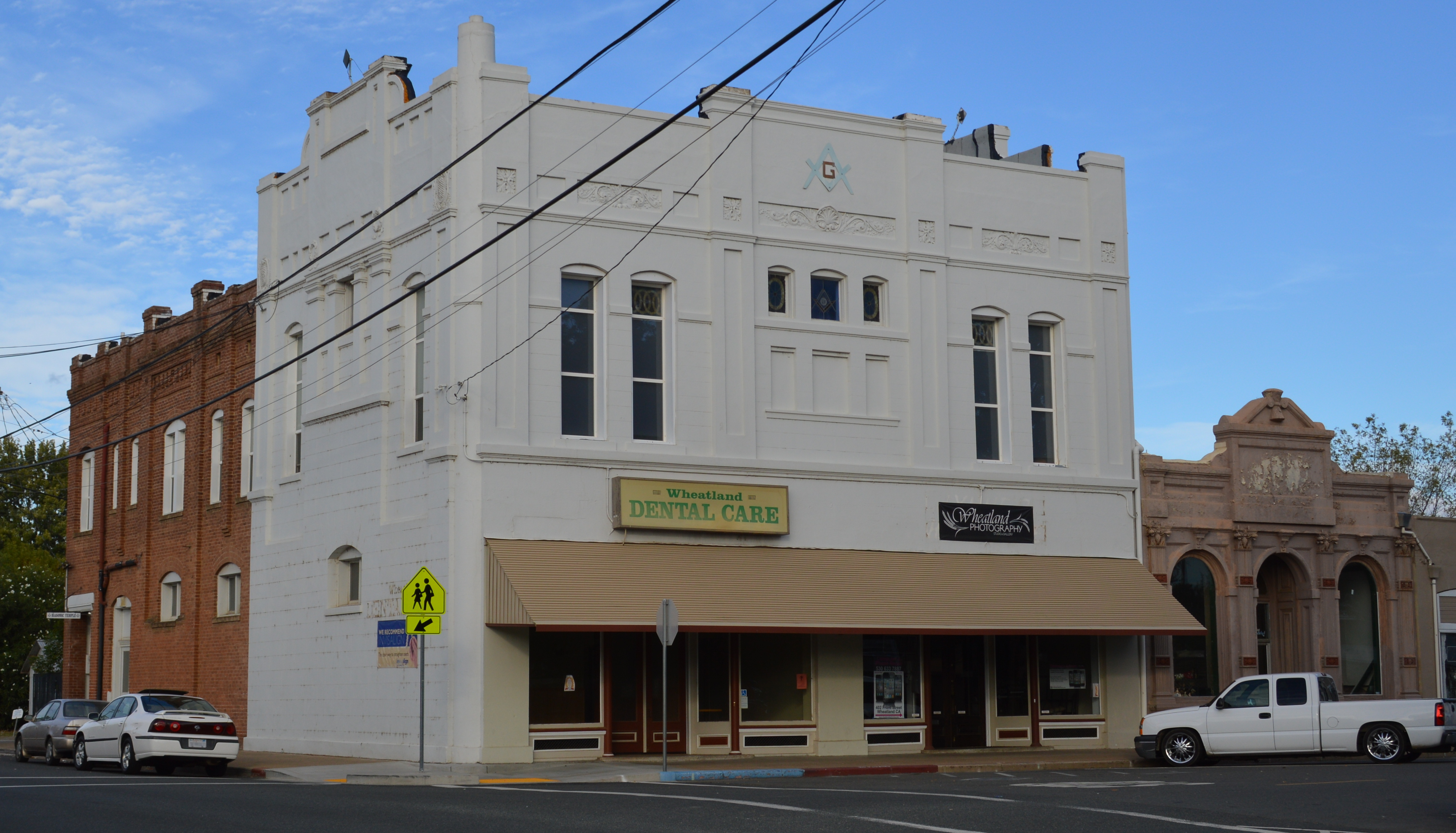
- Englebright Lake in Tahoe National Forest Marysville Yuba River Bullards Bar Lake Wheatland

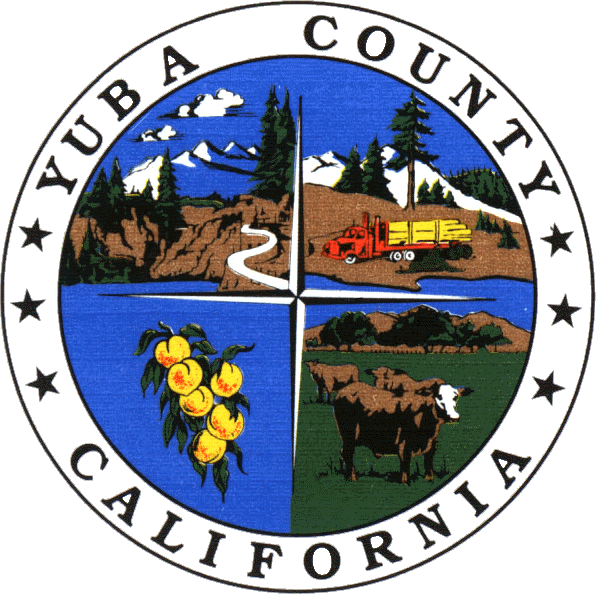
- Seal
- Interactive map of Yuba County
- Location in the state of California
- Country: United States
- State: California
- County: Yuba County
- CSA: Sacramento–Arden-Arcade–Yuba City
- Incorporated: February 18, 1850
- Named for: Yuba River
- County seat: Marysville
- Largest community: Linda (population); Loma Rica (area); Marysville (incorporated)

Government
  - Type: Council–Administrator
  - Chair: Seth Fuhrer
  - Vice Chair: Jon Messick
  - Board of Supervisors: Supervisors: Andy Vasquez Jr.; Renick House; Seth Fuhrer; Gary Bradford; Jon Messick
  - County Administrator: Kevin Mallen

Area
  - Total: 644 sq mi (1,670 km^{2})
  - Land: 632 sq mi (1,640 km^{2})
  - Water: 12 sq mi (31 km^{2})
- Highest elevation: 4,828 ft (1,472 m)

Population (2020)
  - Total: 81,575
  - Estimate (2025): 88,691 ▲
  - Density: 129/sq mi (49.8/km^{2})

GDP
  - Total: $3.768 billion (2022)
- Time zone: UTC-8 (Pacific Time Zone)
  - Summer (DST): UTC-7 (Pacific Daylight Time)
- Congressional districts: 1st, 3rd
- Website: www.yuba.gov

Yuba County (/ˈjuːbə/; Maidu: Yubu) is a county located in north-central Central Valley, California, United States. As of the 2020 U.S. census, its population was 81,575. Yuba County is included in the Yuba City metropolitan statistical area, which is also included in the Sacramento–Roseville combined statistical area. The county is in the Central Valley region along the Feather River; the county seat is Marysville.

== History ==
Yuba County was one of California's original counties, formed in 1850 at the time of statehood. Parts of the county's territory were given to Placer County in 1851, to Nevada County in 1851, and to Sierra County in 1852.

The county was named after the Yuba River by Captain John Sutter for the Maidu village Yubu, Yupu, or Juba near the confluence of the Yuba and Feather Rivers. General Mariano Vallejo said the river was named Uba by an exploring expedition in 1824 because of the quantities of wild grapes (uvas silvestres in Spanish) that they found growing on its banks.

== Geography ==
According to the U.S. Census Bureau, the county has an area of 644 square miles (1,670 km^{2}), of which 12 square miles (31 km^{2}) (1.9%) are covered by water. It is California's fifth-smallest county by area. The county lies along the western slope of the Sierra Nevada, the steep slopes making it prime territory for the siting of hydroelectric power plants.

Part of the county, where Marysville (the county seat) and most of the population lives, is west of the mountains on the valley floor; a great deal of agricultural business occurs in this part of the county, especially fruit orchards, rice fields, and cattle ranching.

=== Ecology ===
Yuba is the most biodiverse county in the contiguous United States, with a documented 1,968 native vascular plant species per 10,000 square kilometres (3,860 sq mi), and 2,772 total species verifiably observed. Flowering plant species include the yellow mariposa lily (Calochortus luteus).

National protected areas in Yuba County include parts of the Plumas National Forest and the Tahoe National Forest. The county also has natural areas consisting of forests, grasslands, riparian areas, and meadows.

=== Adjacent counties ===
- Butte County to the north
- Sierra County to the northeast
- Nevada County to the east
- Placer County to the southeast
- Sutter County to the southwest

== Crime ==
This table includes the number of incidents reported and the rate per 1,000 persons for each type of offense:

Population and crime rates
Population	71,817	
Violent crime	279	3.88
Homicide	3	0.04
Forcible rape	24	0.33
Robbery	46	0.64
Aggravated assault	206	2.87
Property crime	883	12.30
Burglary	455	6.34
Larceny-theft (Note: Only larceny-theft cases involving property over $400 in value are reported as property crimes.)	836	11.64
Motor vehicle theft	208	2.90
Arson	21	0.29

=== Cities by population and crime rates ===
Cities by population and crime rates
City	Population	Violent crimes	Violent crime rate per 1,000 persons	Property crimes	Property crime rate per 1,000 persons
Marysville	12,254	88	7.18	502	40.97
Wheatland	3,509	2	0.57	36	10.26

== Politics ==
=== Voter registration statistics ===
Population and registered voters
Total population	81,575	
Registered voters (Note: Percentage of registered voters with respect to total population. Percentages of party members with respect to registered voters follow.)	44,078	54.03%
Democratic	12,351	28.02%
Republican	17,988	40.81%
Democratic–Republican spread	-5,637	-12.79%
American Independent	2,547	5.78%
Green	175	0.40%
Libertarian	676	1.53%
Peace and Freedom	315	0.71%
Unknown	290	0.66%
Other	369	0.84%
No party preference	9,367	21.25%

==== Cities by population and voter registration ====
Cities by population and voter registration
City	Population	Registered voters	Democratic	Republican	D–R spread	Third parties, Unknown, Other	No party preference
Marysville	12,844	6,195	1,768	2,400	-10.20%	652	1,375
Wheatland	3,712	2,272	504	1,092	-25.88%	245	431
Unincorporated Areas	65,019	35,611	10,079	14,496	-12.40%	3,475	7,561

=== Overview ===
Yuba is a strongly Republican county in presidential and congressional elections. The last Democratic presidential nominee to win a majority in the county was Jimmy Carter in 1976.

United States presidential election results for Yuba County, California (Note: This total comprised 1,132 votes for Progressive Theodore Roosevelt (who was official Republican nominee in California), 186 votes for Socialist Eugene V. Debs and 34 votes for Prohibition Party nominee Eugene W. Chafin.)
Year	Republican		Democratic		Third party(ies)	
Year	No.	%	No.	%	No.	%
1880	1,165	49.43%	1,185	50.28%	7	0.30%
1884	1,214	52.55%	1,047	45.32%	49	2.12%
1888	1,130	46.37%	1,170	48.01%	137	5.62%
1892	1,079	45.41%	1,198	50.42%	99	4.17%
1896	1,204	53.82%	991	44.30%	42	1.88%
1900	1,179	54.08%	971	44.54%	30	1.38%
1904	1,235	63.37%	633	32.48%	81	4.16%
1908	1,270	55.24%	902	39.23%	127	5.52%
1912	17	0.65%	1,242	47.57%	1,352	51.78%
1916	1,530	42.10%	1,980	54.49%	124	3.41%
1920	2,012	70.70%	696	24.46%	138	4.85%
1924	1,735	45.88%	426	11.26%	1,621	42.86%
1928	2,022	50.02%	1,990	49.23%	30	0.74%
1932	1,176	26.17%	3,138	69.84%	179	3.98%
1936	1,332	23.95%	4,125	74.18%	104	1.87%
1940	2,471	34.24%	4,660	64.57%	86	1.19%
1944	2,379	42.14%	3,254	57.63%	13	0.23%
1948	3,403	46.85%	3,608	49.68%	252	3.47%
1952	5,840	60.42%	3,762	38.92%	63	0.65%
1956	4,782	55.76%	3,767	43.92%	27	0.31%
1960	5,293	51.72%	4,882	47.71%	58	0.57%
1964	4,964	42.29%	6,766	57.64%	9	0.08%
1968	5,371	48.17%	4,461	40.01%	1,318	11.82%
1972	6,623	56.95%	4,435	38.13%	572	4.92%
1976	5,496	44.74%	6,451	52.51%	338	2.75%
1980	7,942	56.28%	4,896	34.70%	1,273	9.02%
1984	9,780	63.52%	5,339	34.68%	278	1.81%
1988	8,937	61.37%	5,444	37.38%	182	1.25%
1992	7,333	43.40%	5,785	34.24%	3,777	22.36%
1996	7,971	51.53%	5,789	37.42%	1,710	11.05%
2000	9,838	61.00%	5,546	34.39%	743	4.61%
2004	12,076	67.00%	5,687	31.55%	261	1.45%
2008	12,007	56.10%	8,866	41.43%	528	2.47%
2012	11,275	57.23%	7,711	39.14%	714	3.62%
2016	13,170	57.27%	7,910	34.39%	1,918	8.34%
2020	17,676	59.32%	11,230	37.69%	890	2.99%
2024	18,491	61.49%	10,725	35.66%	856	2.85%

In the United States House of Representatives, Yuba County is split between California's 1st congressional district, represented by Republican James Gallagher, and California's 3rd congressional district, represented by Independent Kevin Kiley.

In the California State Legislature, the county is in the 1st senatorial district, represented by Republican Megan Dahle, and the 3rd Assembly district, represented by Vacant.

== Transportation ==
=== Major highways ===
- State Route 20
- State Route 49
- State Route 65
- State Route 70

=== Public transportation ===
Yuba Sutter Transit operates local bus service, as well as commuter runs to downtown Sacramento. Greyhound buses stop in Marysville.

=== Airports ===
Yuba County Airport is 3 miles (4.8 km) south of Marysville. It is a general-aviation airport.

Brownsville Aero Pines Airport is off La Porte Rd in Brownsville.

== Demographics ==
Historical population
Census	Pop.	Note	%±
1850	9,673		—
1860	13,668		41.3%
1870	10,851		−20.6%
1880	11,284		4.0%
1890	9,636		−14.6%
1900	8,620		−10.5%
1910	10,042		16.5%
1920	10,375		3.3%
1930	11,331		9.2%
1940	17,034		50.3%
1950	24,420		43.4%
1960	33,859		38.7%
1970	44,736		32.1%
1980	49,733		11.2%
1990	58,228		17.1%
2000	60,219		3.4%
2010	72,155		19.8%
2020	81,575		13.1%
2025 (est.)	88,691	▲	8.7%
U.S. Decennial Census; 1790–1960 1900–1990; 1990–2000 2010 2020

=== 2020 census ===
As of the 2020 census, the county had a population of 81,575. The median age was 34.3 years, 27.0% of residents were under the age of 18, and 13.4% of residents were 65 years of age or older. For every 100 females there were 101.4 males, and for every 100 females age 18 and over there were 99.5 males age 18 and over.

The racial makeup of the county was 57.1% White, 3.7% Black or African American, 2.2% American Indian and Alaska Native, 7.1% Asian, 0.5% Native Hawaiian and Pacific Islander, 15.0% from some other race, and 14.4% from two or more races. Hispanic or Latino residents of any race comprised 28.8% of the population.

70.5% of residents lived in urban areas, while 29.5% lived in rural areas.

There were 27,008 households in the county, of which 39.9% had children under the age of 18 living with them and 23.6% had a female householder with no spouse or partner present. About 21.5% of all households were made up of individuals and 8.6% had someone living alone who was 65 years of age or older.

There were 29,458 housing units, of which 8.3% were vacant. Among occupied housing units, 61.3% were owner-occupied and 38.7% were renter-occupied. The homeowner vacancy rate was 1.8% and the rental vacancy rate was 3.9%.

=== Racial and ethnic composition ===
Yuba County, California – Racial and ethnic composition Note: the US Census treats Hispanic/Latino as an ethnic category. This table excludes Latinos from the racial categories and assigns them to a separate category. Hispanics/Latinos may be of any race.
Race / Ethnicity (NH = Non-Hispanic)	Pop 1980	Pop 1990	Pop 2000	Pop 2010	Pop 2020	% 1980	% 1990	% 2000	% 2010	% 2020
White alone (NH)	40,366	42,924	39,320	42,416	41,750	81.17%	73.72%	65.30%	58.78%	51.18%
Black or African American alone (NH)	2,193	2,341	1,795	2,122	2,831	4.41%	4.02%	2.98%	2.94%	3.47%
Native American or Alaska Native alone (NH)	1,146	1,530	1,306	1,260	1,034	2.30%	2.63%	2.17%	1.75%	1.27%
Asian alone (NH)	1,377	4,625	4,480	4,710	5,583	2.77%	7.94%	7.44%	6.53%	6.84%
Native Hawaiian or Pacific Islander alone (NH)	x	x	98	270	372	x	x	0.16%	0.37%	0.46%
Other race alone (NH)	284	80	120	102	459	0.57%	0.14%	0.20%	0.14%	0.56%
Mixed race or Multiracial (NH)	x	x	2,651	3,224	6,026	x	x	4.40%	4.47%	7.39%
Hispanic or Latino (any race)	4,367	6,728	10,449	18,051	23,520	8.78%	11.55%	17.35%	25.02%	28.83%
Total	49,733	58,228	60,219	72,155	81,575	100.00%	100.00%	100.00%	100.00%	100.00%

=== American Community Survey 2025 data ===
The United States Census Bureau estimated that in 2025, Yuba County’s population was 88.691. It was also estimated that the county's population was 44,75% Non-Hispanic White, 33,48% Hispanic or Latino, 4,35% Non-Hispanic Black, 8,96% Asian, 1,16% Native American, 0,57% Pacific Islander, and 6,73% Multiracial.

Total	Population	Percentage
Non-Hispanic White	39.685	44,75%
Hispanic or Latino	29.692	33,48%
Non-Hispanic Black	3.861	4,35%
Asian	7.949	8,96%
Native American	1.030	1,16%
Pacific Islander	509	0,57%
Non-Hispanic Multiracial	5.965	6,73%

=== 2010 census ===
The 2010 United States census reported that Yuba County had a population of 72,155. The racial makeup of Yuba County was 49,332 (68.4%) White, 2,361 (3.3%) African American, 1,675 (2.3%) Native American, 4,862 (6.7%) Asian, 293 (0.4%) Pacific Islander, 8,545 (11.8%) from other races, and 5,087 (7.1%) from two or more races. Hispanics or Latinos of any race were 18,051 persons (25.0%).

Population reported at 2010 United States census
The County	Total Population	White	African American	Native American	Asian	Pacific Islander	other races	two or more races	Hispanic or Latino (of any race)
Yuba County	72,155	49,332	2,361	1,675	4,862	293	8,545	5,087	18,051
Incorporated cities	Total Population	White	African American	Native American	Asian	Pacific Islander	other races	two or more races	Hispanic or Latino (of any race)
Marysville	12,072	8,576	522	298	498	38	1,247	893	2,920
Wheatland	3,456	2,633	41	58	203	5	278	238	620
Census-designated places	Total Population	White	African American	Native American	Asian	Pacific Islander	other races	two or more races	Hispanic or Latino (of any race)
Beale AFB	1,319	949	117	32	45	8	50	118	191
Camptonville	158	117	0	15	2	0	4	20	5
Challenge-Brownsville	1,148	1,006	10	31	5	3	10	83	90
Dobbins	624	517	5	52	6	0	9	35	28
Linda	17,773	9,973	722	361	2,304	80	3,029	1,304	5,779
Loma Rica	2,368	2,085	20	60	20	2	52	129	211
Olivehurst	13,656	8,534	322	399	772	61	2,623	945	4,994
Plumas Lake	5,853	3,923	372	73	474	44	451	516	1,312
Smartsville	177	157	0	5	0	0	9	6	18
Other unincorporated areas	Total Population	White	African American	Native American	Asian	Pacific Islander	other races	two or more races	Hispanic or Latino (of any race)
All others not CDPs (combined)	13,551	10,862	230	291	533	52	783	800	1,883

=== 2000 census ===
As of the census of 2000, 60,219 people, 20,535 households, and 14,805 families resided in the county. The population density was 96 inhabitants per square mile (37/km^{2}). The 22,636 housing units had an average density of 36 per square mile (14/km^{2}). The racial makeup of the county was 70.6% White, 3.2% African American, 2.6% Native American, 7.5% Asian, 0.2% Pacific Islander, 10.0% from other races, and 5.9% from two or more races. About 17.4% of the population were Hispanics or Latinos of any race. Ancestry distribution was 11.2% German, 10.4% American, 7.6% Irish, and 7.5% English according to Census 2000; 78.8% spoke English, 13.2% Spanish, and 4.7% Hmong as their first language.

Of the 20,535 households, 38.1% had children under living with them, 53.2% were married couples living together, 13.3% had a female householder with no husband present, and 27.9% were not families. About 21.7% of all households were made up of individuals, and 8.2% had someone living alone who was 65 or older. The average household size was 2.87, and the average family size was 3.34.

In the county, the age distribution was 31.0% under 18, 10.7% from 18 to 24, 28.0% from 25 to 44, 19.6% from 45 to 64, and 10.6% who were 65 or older. The median age was 31 years. For every 100 females, there were 101.6 males. For every 100 females 18 and over, there were 99.4 males.

The median income for a household in the county was $30,460, and for a family was $34,103. Males had a median income of $27,845 versus $21,301 for females. The per capita income for the county was $14,124. About 16.3% of families and 20.8% of the population were below the poverty line, including 27.6% of those under age 18 and 7.8% of those age 65 or over.

== Education ==
Higher education is available at Yuba Community College. The county also has a Yuba County Library system with one branch in Marysville.

Yuba County schools have a 16% suspension rate, with 2,257 students receiving suspensions out of 14,027 students enrolled in Yuba County schools.

There is one unified school district covering portions of the county for all grades Kindergarten through 12, Marysville Joint Unified School District, and a section of the county is under the Nevada Joint Union High School District only for high school grades. Additionally, there is one secondary school district, Wheatland Union High School District, and the following elementary school districts: Camptonville Elementary School District, Plumas Lake Elementary School District, and Wheatland Elementary School District.

== Communities ==
=== Cities ===
- Marysville (county seat)
- Wheatland

=== Census-designated places ===
- Beale Air Force Base
- Camptonville
- Challenge-Brownsville
- Dobbins
- Linda
- Loma Rica
- Olivehurst
- Plumas Lake
- Smartsville

=== Other unincorporated communities ===
- Arboga
- Browns Valley
- Frenchtown
- Greenville
- Hammonton
- Horstville
- Oak Valley
- Oregon House
- Rackerby
- Sicard Flat
- Strawberry Valley
- Timbuctoo
- Waldo Junction
- Woodleaf

Some parts of forbestown

=== Ghost towns ===
- Plumas Landing
- Round Tent

=== Population ranking ===
The population ranking of the following table is based on the 2020 census of Yuba County.

Rank	City/Town/etc.	Municipal type	Population (2020 census)
1	Linda	CDP	21,654
2	Olivehurst	CDP	16,595
3	† Marysville	City	12,844
4	Plumas Lake	CDP	8,126
5	Wheatland	City	3,712
6	Loma Rica	CDP	2,409
7	Beale Air Force Base	CDP	1,303
8	Challenge-Brownsville	CDP	1,161
9	Dobbins	CDP	551
10	Smartsville	CDP	185
11	Camptonville	CDP	158

== See also ==
- Hiking trails in Yuba County
- National Register of Historic Places listings in Yuba County, California
- Yuba County Five
