= Gridley, California =

City in California, United States

- General Law City
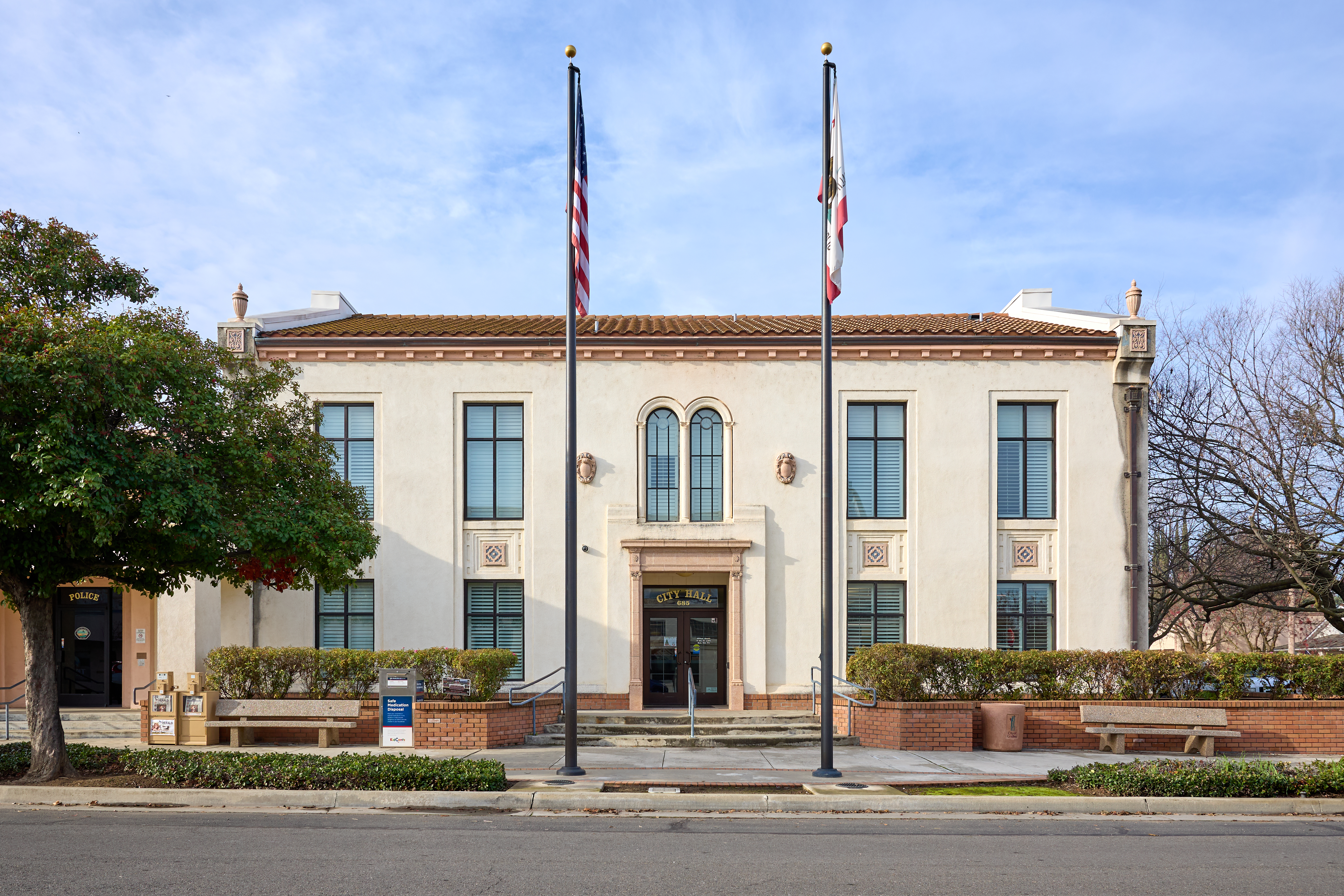
- Gridley City Hall in December 2023

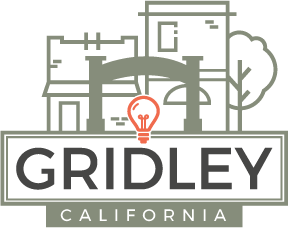
- Seal
- Nickname: A Distinguished California City
- Motto: The Small Town that Loves Company
- Interactive map of Gridley, California
- Location in the United States
- Coordinates: 39°21′50″N 121°41′37″W
- Country: United States
- State: California
- County: Butte
- Incorporated: November 23, 1905
- Named for: George W. Gridley

Government
  - Mayor: Mike Farr
  - Administrator: Elisa Arteaga
  - State Senator: Megan Dahle (R)
  - CA Assembly: Vacant
  - U. S. Congress: James Gallagher (R)

Area
  - Total: 2.08 sq mi (5.40 km^{2})
  - Land: 2.08 sq mi (5.40 km^{2})
  - Water: 0 sq mi (0.00 km^{2}) 0%
- Elevation: 95 ft (29 m)

Population (2020)
  - Total: 7,421
  - Density: 3,560/sq mi (1,370/km^{2})
- Time zone: UTC-8 (Pacific)
  - Summer (DST): UTC-7 (PDT)
- ZIP code: 95948
- Area code: 530, 837
- FIPS code: 06-31260
- GNIS feature IDs: 277526, 2410665
- Website: www.gridleyca.gov

Gridley is a city in Butte County, California, United States, 29 miles (47 kilometers) south of Chico and 56 miles (90 kilometers) north of Sacramento. The population as of April 1, 2020, is 7,421. California State Route 99 runs through Gridley and Interstate 5 and California State Route 70 both pass nearby.

== History ==
=== Gridley ===
Tribal groups, including the Maidu people, were settled in the region when they were first encountered by Spanish and Mexican scouting expeditions in the early 18th century. In the 1850s George W. Gridley, a wool grower and grain farmer who at the time was one of the largest landowners in Butte County, settled a 960-acre (390 ha) home ranch west of the town site that was to be named after him. Gridley was established in 1870 when the Oregon and California Railroad was constructed north from Marysville. The railroad reached Chico on July 2, 1870. In the summer of 1891, a series of major fires "nearly swept away" much of Gridley, and the business district was nearly destroyed again by an additional fire in July 1905.

=== Mormons ===
In response to a "The Place Where Crops Never Fail" advertising campaign by the California Irrigated Land Company, members of The Church of Jesus Christ of Latter-day Saints began emigrating from the Rexburg, Idaho area to Gridley in November 1906. By February of the following year the Gridley Branch of the church was organized and more Latter-day Saints continued coming to Gridley from Idaho, Nevada, Utah and other states, effectively turning this small farming community into a Mormon enclave. By the end of 1908 there were some 500 LDS settlers in the Gridley area and their first chapel was constructed on the west corner of Sycamore and Vermont Streets in 1912 with a seating capacity of 1,000—the largest LDS meetinghouse west of Salt Lake City at that time.

=== 21st century ===
Following a fire in November 2018 in Paradise, California, 400 temporary modular housing units called the "Gridley Camp Fire Community" were erected at a city-owned industrial park in Gridley.

In 2020, Gridley was the place where former NASA engineer and YouTube star Mark Rober achieved a world record of the World's Largest Elephant's Toothpaste Explosion with a height of 60 feet (18 m), before subsequently breaking the record again with a height of 250 feet (76 m) in 2021.

== Geography ==
According to the United States Census Bureau, the city has a total area of 2.1 square miles (5.4 km^{2}), all land.

=== Climate ===
According to the Köppen climate classification system, Gridley has a hot-summer Mediterranean climate, abbreviated Csa on climate maps.

Climate data for Gridley
Month	Jan	Feb	Mar	Apr	May	Jun	Jul	Aug	Sep	Oct	Nov	Dec	Year
Record high °F (°C)	70 (21)	78 (26)	84 (29)	95 (35)	106 (41)	108 (42)	113 (45)	113 (45)	112 (44)	101 (38)	84 (29)	72 (22)	113 (45)
Mean daily maximum °F (°C)	52 (11)	59 (15)	63.2 (17.3)	73.4 (23.0)	80.6 (27.0)	88 (31)	96 (36)	93.5 (34.2)	89.8 (32.1)	77.5 (25.3)	63.4 (17.4)	54.1 (12.3)	74.2 (23.4)
Mean daily minimum °F (°C)	34.8 (1.6)	37.9 (3.3)	41.6 (5.3)	46.3 (7.9)	52.4 (11.3)	57.1 (13.9)	60.9 (16.1)	58.4 (14.7)	55.7 (13.2)	48.3 (9.1)	40.1 (4.5)	37.5 (3.1)	47.6 (8.7)
Record low °F (°C)	19 (−7)	24 (−4)	26 (−3)	28 (−2)	36 (2)	42 (6)	48 (9)	48 (9)	42 (6)	28 (−2)	20 (−7)	22 (−6)	19 (−7)
Average precipitation inches (mm)	5.07 (129)	3.05 (77)	2.62 (67)	1.04 (26)	0.86 (22)	0.26 (6.6)	0.03 (0.76)	0.02 (0.51)	0.36 (9.1)	0.89 (23)	2.25 (57)	3.72 (94)	20.19 (513)
Average snowfall inches (cm)	0.4 (1.0)	0.1 (0.25)	0 (0)	0 (0)	0 (0)	0 (0)	0 (0)	0 (0)	0 (0)	0 (0)	0 (0)	0 (0)	0.5 (1.3)
Average precipitation days (≥ 0.01 inch)	12	9	9	4	4	2	0	0	1	4	6	10	61

== Demographics ==
Historical population
Census	Pop.	Note	%±
1880	352		—
1890	686		94.9%
1910	987		—
1920	1,636		65.8%
1930	1,941		18.6%
1940	2,338		20.5%
1950	3,054		30.6%
1960	3,343		9.5%
1970	3,534		5.7%
1980	3,982		12.7%
1990	4,631		16.3%
2000	5,382		16.2%
2010	6,584		22.3%
2020	7,421		12.7%
U.S. Decennial Census

=== 2020 census ===
As of the 2020 census, Gridley had a population of 7,421. The population density was 3,555.8 inhabitants per square mile (1,372.9/km^{2}). The median age was 36.1 years. 26.7% of residents were under the age of 18 and 15.8% were 65 years of age or older. For every 100 females, there were 96.2 males, and for every 100 females age 18 and over, there were 91.6 males.

The census reported that 97.3% of the population lived in households, 0.7% lived in non-institutionalized group quarters, and 2.0% were institutionalized. There were 2,446 households, of which 40.9% had children under the age of 18 living in them. Of all households, 48.2% were married-couple households, 16.6% were households with a male householder and no spouse or partner present, and 27.4% were households with a female householder and no spouse or partner present. About 22.4% of all households were made up of individuals, and 10.5% had someone living alone who was 65 years of age or older. The average household size was 2.95. There were 1,729 families (70.7% of all households).

There were 2,579 housing units, of which 2,446 (94.8%) were occupied and 5.2% were vacant. Of occupied units, 56.2% were owner-occupied and 43.8% were occupied by renters. The homeowner vacancy rate was 1.8% and the rental vacancy rate was 2.5%.

100.0% of residents lived in urban areas, while 0.0% lived in rural areas.

Racial composition as of the 2020 census
Race	Number	Percent
White	3,705	49.9%
Black or African American	62	0.8%
American Indian and Alaska Native	135	1.8%
Asian	286	3.9%
Native Hawaiian and Other Pacific Islander	9	0.1%
Some other race	2,115	28.5%
Two or more races	1,109	14.9%
Hispanic or Latino (of any race)	3,633	49.0%

=== Demographic estimates ===
In 2023, the US Census Bureau estimated that 16.3% of the population were foreign-born. Of all people aged 5 or older, 72.3% spoke only English at home, 26.8% spoke Spanish, 0.4% spoke other Indo-European languages, 0.3% spoke Asian or Pacific Islander languages, and 0.2% spoke other languages. Of those aged 25 or older, 82.1% were high school graduates and 14.9% had a bachelor's degree.

=== Income and poverty ===
The median household income in 2023 was $57,860, and the per capita income was $28,242. About 10.5% of families and 11.6% of the population were below the poverty line.

=== 2010 census ===
The 2010 United States census reported that Gridley had a population of 6,584. The population density was 3,179.1 inhabitants per square mile (1,227.5/km^{2}). The racial makeup of Gridley was 4,283 (65.1%) White, 55 (0.8%) African American, 98 (1.5%) Native American, 249 (3.8%) Asian, 3 (0.0%) Pacific Islander, 1,552 (23.6%) from other races, and 344 (5.2%) from two or more races. Hispanic or Latino of any race were 3,000 persons (45.6%).

The Census reported that 6,472 people (98.3% of the population) lived in households, 16 (0.2%) lived in non-institutionalized group quarters, and 96 (1.5%) were institutionalized. There were 2,183 households, out of which 910 (41.7%) had children under the age of 18 living in them, 1,087 (49.8%) were opposite-sex married couples living together, 338 (15.5%) had a female householder with no husband present, 134 (6.1%) had a male householder with no wife present. There were 149 (6.8%) unmarried opposite-sex partnerships, and 8 (0.4%) same-sex married couples or partnerships. 520 households (23.8%) were made up of individuals, and 297 (13.6%) had someone living alone who was 65 years of age or older. The average household size was 2.96. There were 1,559 families (71.4% of all households); the average family size was 3.54.

The population was spread out, with 1,892 people (28.7%) under the age of 18, 668 people (10.1%) aged 18 to 24, 1,681 people (25.5%) aged 25 to 44, 1,415 people (21.5%) aged 45 to 64, and 928 people (14.1%) who were 65 years of age or older. The median age was 33.1 years. For every 100 females, there were 94.3 males. For every 100 females age 18 and over, there were 91.6 males.

There were 2,406 housing units at an average density of 1,161.7 units per square mile (448.5 units/km^{2}), of which 2,183 were occupied, of which 1,262 (57.8%) were owner-occupied, and 921 (42.2%) were occupied by renters. The homeowner vacancy rate was 2.6%; the rental vacancy rate was 6.5%. 3,829 people (58.2% of the population) lived in owner-occupied housing units and 2,643 people (40.1%) lived in rental housing units.

== Economy ==
Gridley is adjacent to the Sacramento metropolitan area, the fifth largest metropolitan area in California.

=== Tourism ===
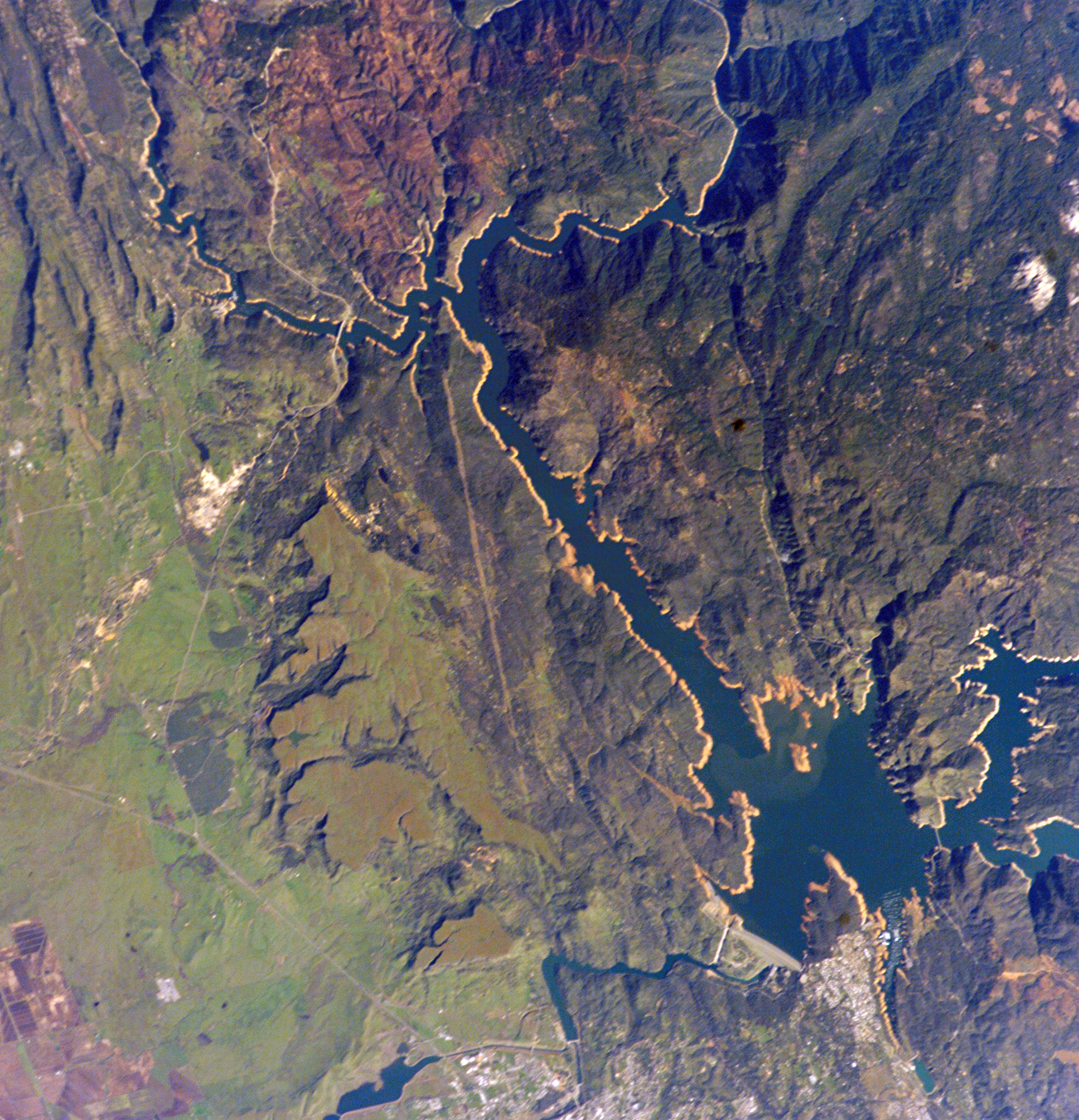
Photograph of Lake Oroville in the foothills of the Sierra Nevada mountains.

- The Gridley area is a sportsman's haven. Excellent hunting, fishing and naturalist opportunities are available on private and public lands. The Gray Lodge Wildlife Waterfowl Management Area, part of the Refuge Water Supply Program is located 10 miles (16 kilometers) southwest of Gridley. Its 8,400 acres form some of the most intensively used and developed wetlands in the entire Pacific Flyway.
- Gridley is 24 miles (39 kilometers) away from the recreational facilities available at Lake Oroville. Lake Oroville and the Oroville Afterbay feed into the clear rolling waters of the Feather River, which provides some of the best salmon fishing in the state. The Oroville Dam is one of the 20 largest dams in the world, the largest earth filled dam in the US, and the tallest dam in the US. Lake Oroville has 15,500 surface acres for recreation and 167 miles of shoreline. Lake Oroville features an abundance of camping, picnicking, horseback riding, hiking, sail and power boating, water-skiing, fishing, swimming, boat-in camping, floating campsites and horse camping. At the base of the Dam, the Feather River Fish Hatchery raises Chinook salmon and steelhead along the Feather River.
- Lake Oroville Visitor Center is located in Kelly Ridge and overlooks the Oroville Dam and Lake Oroville. The visitor center is home to a museum with interpretive displays, the history of the dam and the State Water Project. A 47-foot viewing tower also allows the visitor the opportunity to have a panoramic view of the lake and surrounding areas.

== Parks and recreation ==
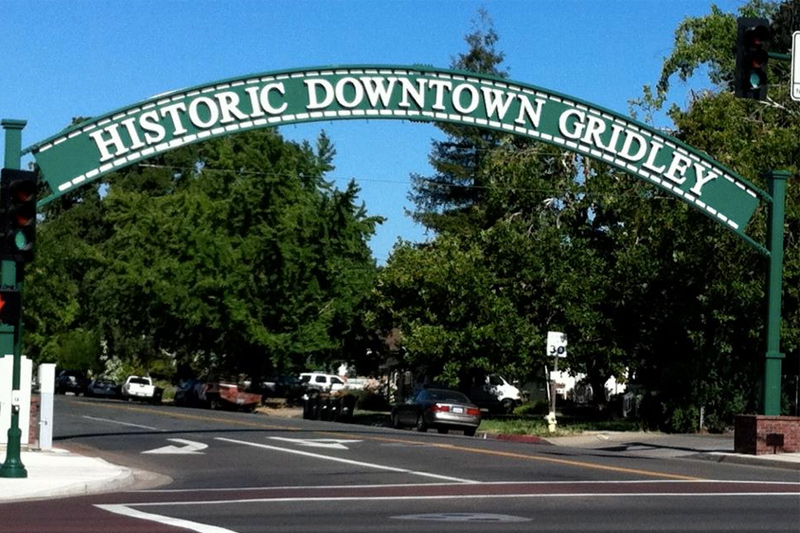
Gridley Arch welcomes visitors

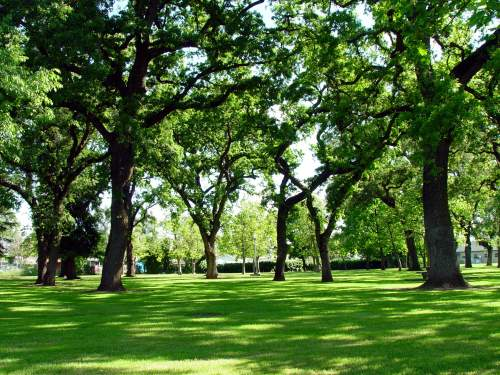
Vierra Park

Gridley has several trails and parks featuring playgrounds, picnic tables and benches. Boat Launch Park includes a new boat ramp and dock, restrooms, lighting, and a fish cleaning table. It is located 3 miles (4.8 kilometers) east of Gridley on East Gridley Road. The modern facility was largely funded by the California Division of Boating and Waterways.

== Education ==
The Gridley Community is served by the Gridley Unified School District. Schools in the Gridley Unified School District include:

- Gridley High School
- Esperanza High School
- Sycamore Middle School
- McKinley Elementary School
- Wilson Elementary School
- Manzanita Elementary School

=== Higher education ===
- California State University, Chico (Chico State)
- Butte College
- Yuba Community College
- Cal Northern School of Law

== Infrastructure ==
=== Healthcare ===
Orchard Hospital is a general acute care facility in Gridley with emergency care.

=== Newspapers ===
The Gridley Herald is a weekly newspaper published in Gridley since 1880. The regional daily paper covering all of Butte County is the Chico Enterprise-Record.

=== Highways ===
Gridley is located in the Central Valley, along California State Route 99, 56 miles (90 kilometers) north of Sacramento. It is close to larger metropolitan areas. California State Route 70 and Interstate 5 are both within 20 miles (32 kilometers).

=== Public transport ===
B-Line Butte Regional Transit is Butte County's regional public transit system. Area residents use B-Line to travel locally in Gridley, Chico, Oroville, and Paradise, or to travel between communities throughout Butte County. Passenger rail service is planned to be initiated to Gridley under the North Valley Rail project.

=== Airport ===
Sacramento International Airport (IATA: SMF, ICAO: KSMF, FAA LID: SMF) is a public airport 52 miles (84 kilometers) south of Gridley, in Sacramento County, California. Southwest Airlines currently accounts for half the airline passengers. The Airport served more than 10 million passengers in 2016.

The Oroville Municipal Airport is located 11 miles (18 kilometers) to the northeast of Gridley on State Route 162 and west of State Route 70.

== Notable people ==
- G. Vernon Bennett, Los Angeles City Council member, 1935–49
- Isaac Austin, retired NBA basketball player, 1991–2004
- Wally Westlake, MLB All-Star baseball player
- Leslie Deniz, Olympic silver medal, 1984 Los Angeles, Women's discus
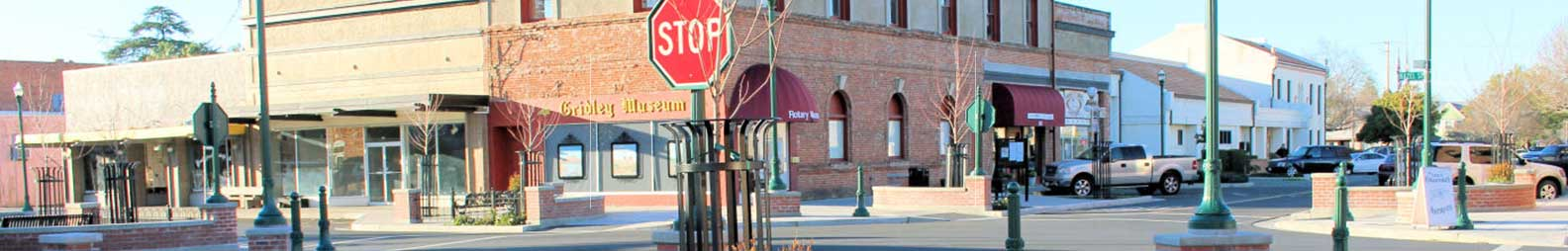
Downtown Gridley
