= Nathan Parks =

American football player (born 1974)

No. 71
- Position: Offensive lineman

Personal information
- Born: October 25, 1974 (age 52); Chico, California, U.S.
- Listed height: 6 ft 5 in (1.96 m)
- Listed weight: 303 lb (137 kg)

Career information
- High school: Durham (Durham, California)
- College: Stanford
- NFL draft: 1997: 7th round, 214th overall pick

Career history
- Kansas City Chiefs (1997–1998); → Scottish Claymores (1999); Oakland Raiders (1999–2000); San Francisco 49ers (2001)*
- * Offseason or practice squad member only
- Stats at Pro Football Reference

Nathan Jacob Parks (born October 25, 1974) is an American former professional football offensive lineman who played for the Oakland Raiders of the National Football League (NFL). He played college football for the Stanford Cardinal and was selected by the Kansas City Chiefs in the seventh round of the 1997 NFL draft.

== Early life ==
Nathan Jacob Parks was born on October 25, 1974, in Chico, California. He attended Durham High School in Durham, California.

== College career ==
Parks played junior college football at Butte College. He redshirted the 1992 season and played the 1993 season. He transferred to Stanford University, where he was a three-year letterman from 1994 to 1996.

== Professional career ==
Parks was selected by the Kansas City Chiefs in the seventh round, with the 214th overall pick, of the 1997 NFL draft. He signed with the team on May 1. He was on the active roster for the entire 1997 season but did not play in any games. Parks was teammates with one of his childhood idols, Marcus Allen. On July 25, 1998, Parks left the team during training camp after informing them that he was considering quitting. On August 5, 1998, he was placed on the reserve left-camp list. Parks was reactivated by the Chiefs in February 1999 and allocated to NFL Europe to play for the Scottish Claymores. He was released by Kansas City on September 5, 1999, before the start of the NFL regular season.

Parks was signed to the Oakland Raiders' practice squad on September 8, 1999. He was promoted to the active roster on October 26 and played in two games for the Raiders as a reserve offensive guard/tackle during the 1999 season. He was on the Raiders' active roster for the entire 2000 season but did not appear in any games. Parks was released on August 31, 2001.

Parks was signed to the San Francisco 49ers' practice squad on October 3, 2001. He was released on October 22, 2001.
