= GUSD =

GUSD may refer to:

- Ganado Unified School District
- Gilroy Unified School District
- Glendale Unified School District
- Goleta Union School District
- Gridley Unified School District
