= Dylan LaBarbera =

American football player

No. 32 – Nevada Wolf Pack
- Position: Defensive end
- Class: Senior

Personal information
- Listed height: 6 ft 1 in (1.85 m)
- Listed weight: 248 lb (112 kg)

Career information
- High school: Foothill (Palo Cedro, California)
- College: Butte (2023); Nevada (2024–present)

Awards and highlights
- First-team All-Mountain West (2025)
- Stats at ESPN

Dylan LaBarbera is an American football defensive tackle for the Nevada Wolf Pack. He previously played for Butte College.

== Early life ==
LaBarbera attended Foothill High School in Palo Cedro, California, and committed to play college football for Butte College.

== College career ==
=== Butte College ===
As a freshman in 2023, LaBarbera recorded 45 tackles with 12 for a loss, five and a half sacks, an interception, and a fumble recovery. After the season, he entered the NCAA transfer portal.

=== Nevada ===
LaBarbera transferred to play for the Nevada Wolf Pack. During the 2024 season, he appeared in 11 games with four starts, notching 31 tackles, with two for a loss, and a forced fumble. In week 7 of the 2025 season, LaBarbera recorded nine tackles, with four for a loss, and two sacks versus San Diego State. He finished the 2025 season with 87 tackles with 17 for a loss, and six and a half sacks. For his performance, LaBarbera earned first-team all-Mountain West honors. Heading into the 2026 season, he was named to the Chuck Bednarik Award watchlist.
