= Tadoiko, California =

Tadoiko is a former Maidu settlement in Butte County, California, United States. It was located near Durham; its precise location is unknown.
