= Butte Regional Transit =

Butte (B-Line) Regional Transit
- Parent: Butte County Association of Governments
- Founded: 2005
- Headquarters: 326 Huss Drive, Suite 150, Chico, CA 95928
- Service area: Butte County
- Service type: fixed route bus service, paratransit service, microtransit service
- Fuel type: Diesel, Gas, Electric
- Operator: Transdev
- Website: https://www.blinetransit.com/

Butte Regional Transit, commonly called B-Line, is a public transit system which provides bus service in the communities of Biggs, Chico, Gridley, Magalia, Oroville, Palermo, Paradise and across Butte County, California. In 2005, the consolidation of CATS in Chico, OATS in Oroville and BCT in Butte County resulted in the formation of this transit agency. This agency is also known as B-Line.

Butte County Association of Governments is a Joint Powers Authority (JPA) and the local Metropolitan Planning Organization (MPO) that is charged with the administration of the system.

Besides operation of the local and regional fixed routes listed in the table below, B-Line also operates local and regional paratransit service, Called PLUS, for ADA qualified individuals and those age 70 or over. PLUS Local service provides door-to-door, scheduled services within the cities of Oroville and Chico and the Town of Paradise. PLUS Regional service is offered for medical-based appointments only.

== Facilities ==
=== Administration & Operations Offices ===
326 Huss Drive, Suites #150 & #125, Chico, CA

=== Chico Transit Center ===
2nd Street at Salem, Chico, CA

=== Oroville Transit Center ===
On Spencer Avenue, Between Mitchel and Olive Hwy., Behind Raley's

=== Paradise Transit Center ===
The Paradise Transit Center is located at the corner of Black Olive Drive and Birch Street. It serves regional Route 41 and is a main hub for FLEX microtransit service on the Ridge.

== Routes ==
| No. | Name | Notes |
|---|---|---|
| 2 | Mangrove | Downtown to Ceres/Lassen |
| 3 | Nord/East | Downtown to North Valley Plaza |
| 4 | First/East | Downtown to North Valley Plaza |
| 5 | East 8th St | Downtown to Chico Mall |
| 7 | Bruce/Manzanita | Ceres/Lassen to North Butte County Courthouse |
| 8 | Nord | Operates weekdays during the CSUC school year |
| 9 | Warner/Oak | Operates weekdays during the CSUC school year |
| 9C | Cedar Loop | Operates on Friday evenings, Saturdays, and any Monday-Thursday that CSUC are not in session |
| 14 | Park/Forest/MLK | Downtown to Chico Mall Operates on Forest and MLK in a clockwise loop |
| 15 | Esplanade/Lassen | Downtown to Ceres/Lassen |
| 16 | Esplanade/SR 99 | Downtown to Esplanade/SR 99 |
| 17 | Park/MLK/Forest | Downtown to Chico Mall Operates on MLK and Forest in a counter-clockwise loop |
| 20 | Chico-Oroville | Chico Transit Center to Oroville Transit Center |
| 24 | Thermalito | Oroville Transit Center to Butte County Public Works |
| 25 | Oro Dam | Oroville Transit Center to Feather River Cinemas |
| 26 | Olive Hwy | Oroville Transit Center to Kelly Ridge (26A) and Canyon Highlands (26B) |
| 27 | South Oroville | Oroville Transit Center to Las Plumas High School |
| 30 | Oroville-Biggs | Oroville Transit Center to Palermo, Gridley, and Biggs |
| 32 | Gridley-Chico | Chico Transit Center to Durham, Gridley, and Biggs |
| 41 | Paradise/Magalia -Chico | Chico Transit Center to Paradise Transit Center and Lakeside Circle in Magalia |
