= Sergio C. Garcia =

Mexican-American lawyer (born 1977)

- Born: Sergio C. Garcia; March 1, 1977 (age 49); Michoacán, Mexico
- Education: Butte College (AA, AS); California State University, Chico; Cal Northern School of Law (JD)

Sergio Covarrubias Garcia (born March 1, 1977) is a Mexican attorney in the United States specializing in personal injury. On February 1, 2014, Garcia, then 36, became the first illegal immigrant to be admitted to the State Bar of California since 2008, when applicants were first required to list citizenship status on bar applications.

== Early life and education ==
Garcia was born in Michoacán, Mexico, to parents Salvador Covarrubias and Albertina Garcia, who brought him to the United States when he was 17 months old. When he was nine years old, Garcia's family moved from the United States back to Mexico, with him in tow. When he was 17, Garcia's father moved his family again, bringing Garcia into the United States illegally a second time, where he has remained ever since. Garcia applied for legal residency on November 18, 1994, but his application remained pending for nearly 19 years. Garcia is the second-oldest of six children, with two brothers and three sisters.

Garcia graduated from Durham High School before earning an associate degree in social and behavioral sciences and another in business administration from Butte College. He completed the paralegal certificate program from California State University, Chico. On May 9, 2009, after years of attending law school at night so he could work during the day, Garcia received a Juris Doctor from Cal Northern School of Law. In July of that same year, Garcia passed the California Bar Exam on his first attempt.

== Career ==
=== California Bar admission ===
On September 4, 2013, the Supreme Court of California heard oral argument on the In re Garcia admission matter. During arguments on the matter, it became apparent that the court would be unable to grant Garcia's petition for bar admission unless legislative action allowed them to do so. Justice Marvin R. Baxter asked why nobody had reached out to the California State Legislature, noting, "I would imagine there would be a great deal of support for something like this." Garcia then began lobbying members of the legislature until a bill was finally introduced recommending applicants be allowed to practice law if they have met all other bar requirements in spite of having been brought into the country unlawfully by their parents. The court testified in a hearing of the legislature recommending that immigrants who were brought here illegally as minors should be allowed to obtain law licenses, and the legislature passed said legislation just three days later. Governor Jerry Brown signed the legislation on October 5, 2013, and the bill went into effect January 1, 2014.

In a January 2, 2014, by unanimous decision consistent with the new legislation, the court instructed the State Bar, an arm of the court, to admit Garcia, rejecting arguments of the United States Department of Justice and others that federal law precluded his admission due to his undocumented status. According to the court's decision, section 1621 of Title 8 of the United States Code "generally restricts an undocumented immigrant's eligibility to obtain a professional license, but that also contains a subsection expressly authorizing a state to render an undocumented immigrant eligible to obtain such a professional license through the enactment of a state law meeting specified requirements."

After Governor Jerry Brown signed Senate Bill No. 1159 on September 28, 2014, requiring "all 40 licensing boards under the California Department of Consumer Affairs to consider applicants regardless of immigration status by 2016," Garcia was cited as being part of the inspiration for the bill.

=== Litigation attorney ===
After learning the Supreme Court of California ruled he could be a lawyer, Garcia told The New York Times, "I can open my own law firm, and that's exactly what I intend to do." On February 3, 2014, Garcia opened The Law Offices of Sergio C. Garcia headquartered in Chico, California. Garcia announced, via Facebook, his intention to open a second law office in Los Angeles in June 2014.

=== Lecturer, motivational speaker, guest appearances ===
As an inspirational speaker and nationally recognized lawyer, Garcia has delivered many keynote addresses and lectures, and participated in panels at venues including Sierra College, the Bickel & Brewer Latino Institute for Human Rights at New York University School of Law, La Raza Centro Legal's 41st Anniversary Celebration, and Napa Valley College's fourth annual Dreamer's Conference.

In early 2014, Saint Mary's Hall, a private college preparatory school in San Antonio, Texas, invited Garcia to be a speaker at their model United Nations conference. However, the school rescinded the invitation to Garcia when he refused to certify that he was a citizen by signing a W-9 form. Before the incident, Saint Mary's Hall had described Garcia as an "experienced and exciting keynote speaker", as well as expressing how unfortunate that he had been waiting for a visa for 19 years.

Garcia has a national segment on MundoFox every Friday. On June 10, 2014, TED published a Garcia talk called "Fighting for Justice, Changing Lives: Sergio Garcia at TEDxBoyleHeights."

On March 28, 2015, Garcia was the guest speaker at the Tehama County Democratic Dinner, where he told attendees, "I would not be here without the many good Democrats of California, and they are my family." Garcia was scheduled to be awarded the 2015 Phillip Burton Immigration and Civil Rights Award on May 28, 2015.

=== Author ===
In 2006, Garcia published a self-help book on romance called Love, Sex and Romance, the proceeds from which he used to pay his law school tuition.

Following his August 2012 appearance at a press conference and guest of honor at California's Capitol Hill, Garcia authored "Soñando de Este a Oeste...," an essay appearing in Spanish on Huffington Post. Garcia coauthored an article appearing in the February 2013 issue of Los Angeles Lawyer titled "Waiting to Become an Attorney after Passing the Bar", encouraging young attorneys to learn how to assist undocumented youths under the Deferred Action for Childhood Arrivals, which would protect undocumented youth from deportation while providing them with a work permit. "One way is to become trained to help applicants to apply for deferred action so that they may obtain some interim status in the United States," wrote Garcia and coauthor.

=== Sergio C. Garcia Foundation ===
Along with money he raises through fundraising, Garcia shares his speaking engagement fees with students struggling financially through scholarships granted by the Sergio C. Garcia Foundation. As of March 18, 2014, the foundation had raised $55,000.
