= Gridley High School =

Location
- 300 E. Spruce St. Gridley, California 95948; United States; 39.367009°N 121.684306°W

Information
- School type: Comprehensive public high school
- Established: 1895
- Status: Operating
- School district: Gridley Unified School District
- Superintendent: Justin Kern
- CEEB code: 051105
- NCES School ID: 060005102016
- Principal: Rikki-Lee Burresch
- Teaching staff: 34.54 (FTE)
- Grades: 9–12
- Gender: Coeducational
- Enrollment: 670 (2024-2025)
- Student to teacher ratio: 19.40
- Campus type: Suburban
- Colors: Navy and gold
- Mascot: Bulldog
- Feeder schools: Sycamore Middle School, Manzanita

Gridley High School is a public high school in Gridley, California, United States, a city north of Sacramento and south of Redding.

== Academics ==
As of 2026, Gridley High School operates on an 8:00 a.m. to 3:06 p.m. schedule. The only exception is on Wednesdays, when the school starts at 8:00 a.m. as usual, but ends at 1:54 p.m.

=== Enrollment ===
Gridley High School had an enrollment of about 670 students in the 2024-2025 school year.

The school is very integrated. In the school year 2024-2025, the student body was 0.3% American Indian/Alaska Native, 3.7% Asian, 0.3% Native Hawaiian/Pacific Islander, 59.1% Hispanic, 0.7% African American, and 34.3% White.

== Athletics ==
Gridley High School offers 18 sport teams, including baseball, softball, basketball, swimming, football, flag football, wrestling, volleyball, track & field, golf, soccer, cross country, tennis, and cheerleading.

== Notable alumni ==
- Leslie Deniz – is a class of 1980 athlete who competed in the 1984 Olympics in Los Angeles. She competed in shot put and discus and won a silver medal in women's discus.
