= Gridley Herald =

Weekly newspaper published in Gridley, California

- Type: Weekly newspaper
- Owner(s): Messenger Publishing Group
- Founder(s): Charles N. Reed
- Publisher: Paul V. Scholl,
- Founded: 1880
- Language: English
- Headquarters: 300 Spruce St Suite C, Gridley, CA 95948
- OCLC number: 27053477
- Website: gridleyherald.com

The Gridley Herald is a weekly newspaper published in Gridley, California.

== History ==
On October 29, 1880, Charles Neff Reed published the first issue of the Gridley Herald. Reed was a drummer boy, orderly and spy in the Union Army for three years during the American Civil War. He was also a direct descendant of Joseph Reed. In 1891, Reed died. In his obituary, the Sacramento Bee called him "one of the best-known and most popular newspaper men in Northern California.

Reed's widow tried running the paper by herself for several months and ended up selling it to a group of local farmers. H. K. Goddard became the manager and Charles L. King did the printing. Charles H. Deuel was hired as editor in 1895, but he left after two years when he and Chet Richards bought the Chico Record.

In 1897, William Davis Burleson arrived in Gridley from North Adams, Michigan after a group of local farmers hired him to work as the Herald's new editor. In 1908, he bought the paper and expanded it to a semi-weekly. His youngest son Charles R. Burleson, who volunteered to fight in WWI, joined the staff in 1919. Charles Burleson became a co-owner and publisher in 1936, and bought out his siblings to became the sole owner in 1938. His father William Burleson operated the paper until his death in 1936. At that time, editorship was passed to Charles Burleson. In 1943, the paper's printer Alvie D. McDaniel bought in as a minority owner.

Charle Burleson's son William "Bill" D. Burleson joined the paper's staff in 1950. Charles Burleson died in 1961. In June 1998, Bill Burleson retired after selling the newspaper to Liberty Group Publishing, which was later renamed to GateHouse Media. In 2018, the paper closed with staff given only a single day of notice. Messenger Publishing Group bought the Herald and revived it two weeks after it closed. None of the paper's former staff were rehired.
