= Refuge Water Supply Program =

US program to supply wetlands in central California with water

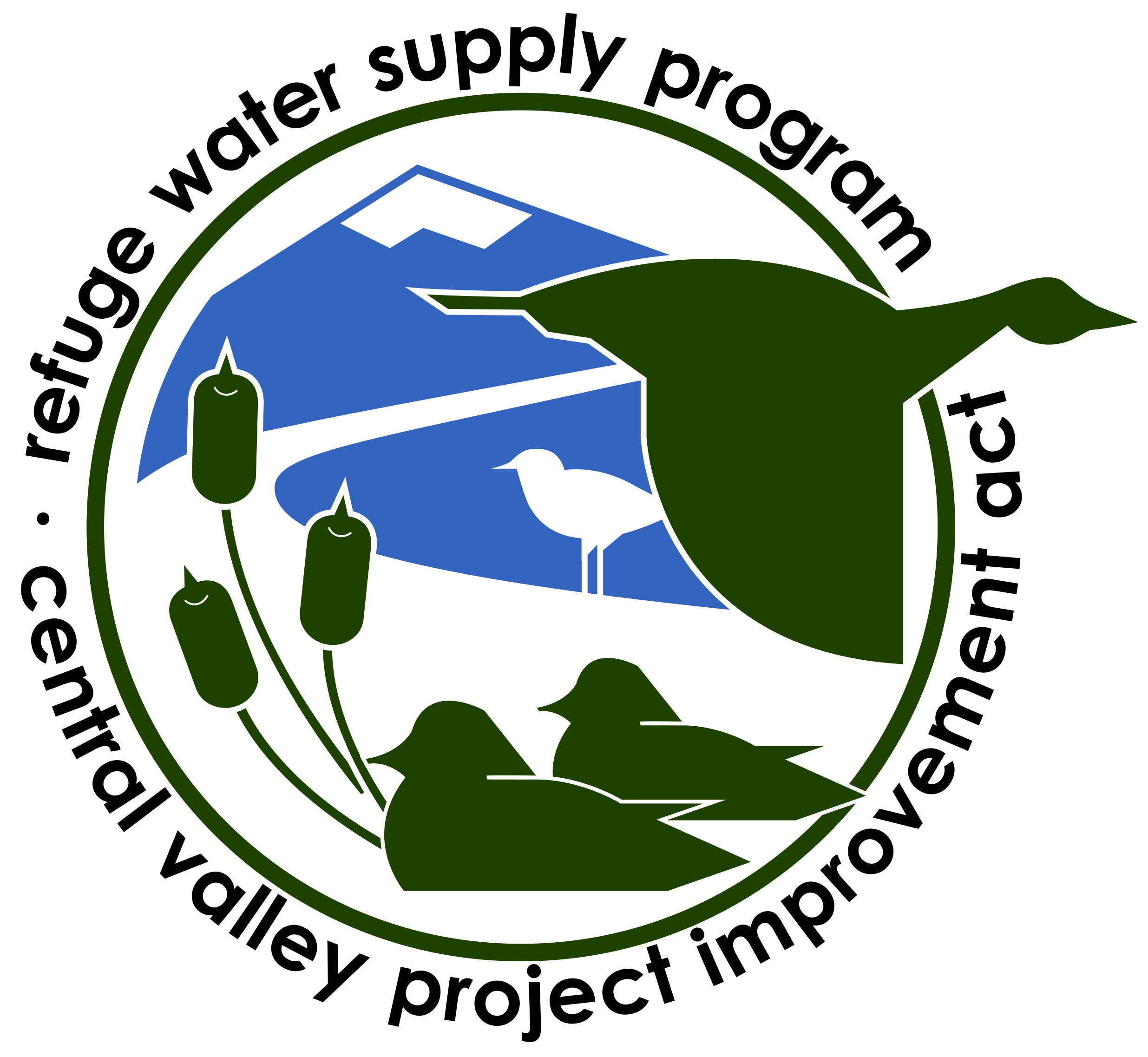
- Logo of the Refuge Water Supply Program.

General statistics
- Program Type: Federal
- Program Administration: Bureau of Reclamation, Fish and Wildlife Service
- Year Begun: 1992
- Wetlands Affected: Sacramento NWR Delevan NWR; Colusa NWR; Sutter NWR; Gray Lodge WA; San Luis NWR Complex; Merced NWR; Los Banos WA; North Grasslands WA; Mendota WA; Volta WA; Grassland RCD; Kern NWR Pixley NWR
- Water Quantity: 555,515AF

The Refuge Water Supply Program (RWSP) is administered by the United States Department of the Interior jointly by the Bureau of Reclamation and Fish and Wildlife Service and tasked with acquiring a portion and delivering a total of 555,515 acre feet (AF) of water annually to 19 specific protected wetland areas in the Central Valley of California as mandated with the passing of the Central Valley Project Improvement Act signed on October 30, 1992, by President George H. W. Bush.

== Background ==
=== The Central Valley Project (CVP) ===
The Central Valley (California) once contained over 4 million acres of naturally occurring wetlands that provided habitat: land, food, and shelter for resident and migratory birds and wildlife. The Central Valley, historically and today, constitutes a significant portion of the Pacific Flyway used by millions of migrating birds each year.

The Central Valley's winter flood-prone geography and summer dry climate were natural constraints to permanent human settlement. The Central Valley Project (CVP); an interconnected engineered system of reservoirs, aqueducts, and flood control measures, constructed by the US Bureau of Reclamation; managed flooding and provided reliable water supplies year-round with highly managed and calculated water storage, release and conveyance infrastructure. Along with the construction of similar facilities by others, the CVP's flood control and water delivery systems created a stable environment suitable for permanent human development in the Central Valley.

Controlling and manipulating the water supply for human benefit dramatically and quickly transformed the landscape. All but 400,000 acres of natural wetlands were transformed for development, a reduction in wetland area of 90%. The loss of wetlands concentrated the migrating and resident wildlife on less land and required their sharing of and dependence on less water. This unhealthy crowding caused bird populations to decline as they suffered from disease and the lack of necessary food, shelter, and water. Compounding the problem, human activity, in some cases, polluted the waters that flowed into the remaining wetlands. The Kesterson Reservoir disaster provided a clear indication that wildlife was suffering in the modified Central Valley and helped inspire actions to mitigate the CVP's effects on bird and fish populations.

=== Central Valley Project Improvement Act ===
The Central Valley Project Improvement Act (CVPIA) was signed into law on October 30, 1992, as mitigation and remedy for some of the CVP's adverse environmental effects, specifically, to increase the population and improve the health of the Central Valley's anadromous fish and increase the acreage and health of wetlands used by migratory birds and other resident wildlife. The CVPIA is managed by the United States Department of Interior through collaboration between the Bureau of Reclamation and the Fish and Wildlife Service.

== Refuge Water Supply Program ==
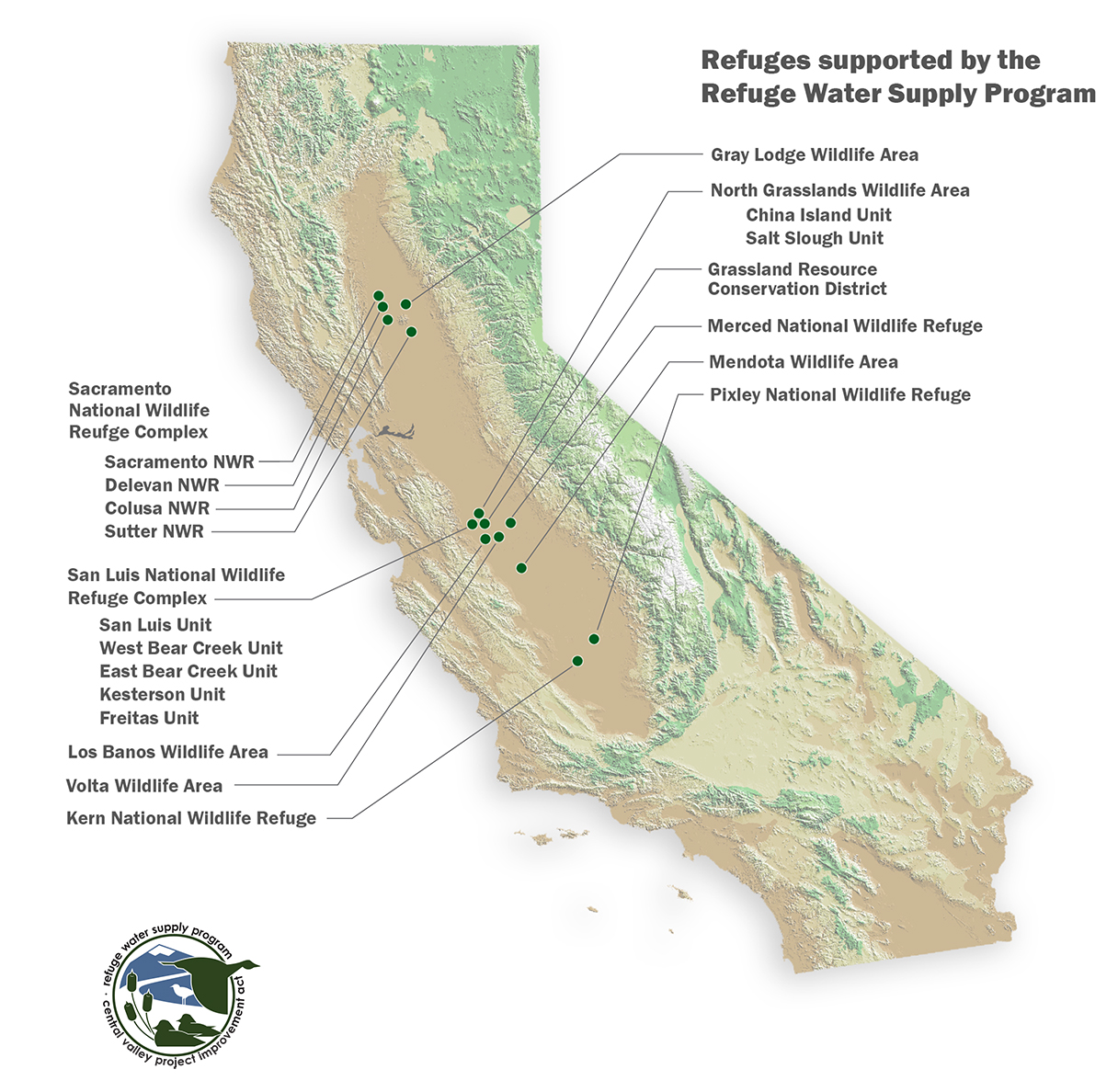
Map of the Refuges Supported by the RWSP

CVPIA Section 3406(d) mandates that 555,515 AF of water of suitable quality be delivered to maintain and improve wetland habitat areas in 19 wetland areas specifically identified in the Report on Refuge Water Supply Investigations (March 1989) and the San Joaquin Basin Action Plan/Kesterson Mitigation Action Plan (December 1989), collectively referred to as 'the Refuges'. These Refuges comprise nearly 200,000 acres of wetlands and as such represent almost 50% of the wetlands remaining in California's Central Valley. Reclamation created the Refuge Water Supply Program (RWSP) to manage and administer the activities necessary to ensure the acquisition and delivery of this water as required under this section. Like the CVPIA, the RWSP is administered jointly by the Bureau of Reclamation (from the Mid-Pacific Regional Office in Sacramento, CA) and the Fish and Wildlife Service (from the Pacific Southwest Regional Office in Sacramento, CA)

=== The Refuges ===
==== National Wildlife Refuges ====
The following Refuges, benefiting from CVPIA legislation, are administered by the Department of the Interior, Fish and Wildlife Service as National Wildlife Refuges. In some instances, the specific Refuge named in the CVPIA is currently a constituent part of an FWS administrative complex of refuges that includes several such refuges and/or other non-benefiting lands.

The following CVPIA benefiting refuges are components of the Sacramento National Wildlife Refuge Complex: Sacramento National Wildlife Refuge, Delevan National Wildlife Refuge, Colusa National Wildlife Refuge, Sutter National Wildlife Refuge.

The following CVPIA benefiting Refuges are components of the San Luis National Wildlife Refuge Complex: San Luis Unit, West Bear Creek Unit, East Bear Creek Unit, Kesterson Unit, Freitas Unit and Merced National Wildlife Refuge. The refuges currently identified as 'Units' were separate refuges at the time the legislation was written and passed.

The following CVPIA benefiting Refuges are components of the Kern National Wildlife Refuge Complex: Kern National Wildlife Refuge and Pixley National Wildlife Refuge

==== California State Wildlife Areas ====
The following Refuges, benefiting from CVPIA legislation, are administered by the State of California, Department of Fish and Wildlife as Wildlife Areas. In some instances, the specific Refuge named in the CVPIA is currently a part of a DFW administrative unit that includes several such refuges and/or other non-benefiting lands.

Gray Lodge Wildlife Area; Los Banos Wildlife Area (portion); the following currently designated 'units' of the North Grasslands Wildlife Area, China Island Unit and Salt Slough Unit; and the Volta Wildlife Area (portion). Note: 'portion', is used to indicate that the current existing wildlife area boundary is larger than it was in the defining report. CVP water obligated for the RWSP is only permitted to be used on that portion of the wildlife area specifically described in the defining report and legislation.

==== The Grasslands Resource Conservation District ====
The Grassland Resource Conservation District (GRCD) comprises 75,000 acres of land including: the Grassland Water District (GWD) which provides water to 165 hunting clubs; the Kesterson and Freitas Units of the San Luis National Wildlife Refuge (NWR); Volta Wildlife Management Area (WMA); Los Banos WMA; and privately owned wetlands. As such, the GRCD includes 60,000 acres of privately owned hunting clubs, 12,000 acres of land owned by the Federal and state governments, and 3,000 acres of cropland. The federal and state Refuges identified in the CVPIA legislation that are within the GRCD do not share GRCD's water allocation.

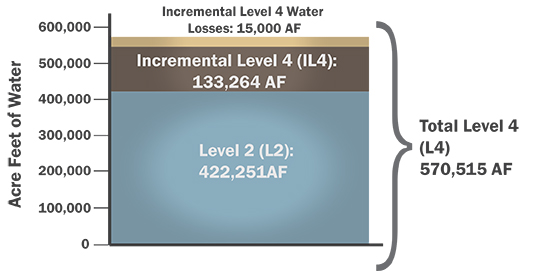
Full Level 4 Water Delivery Totals by Water Type

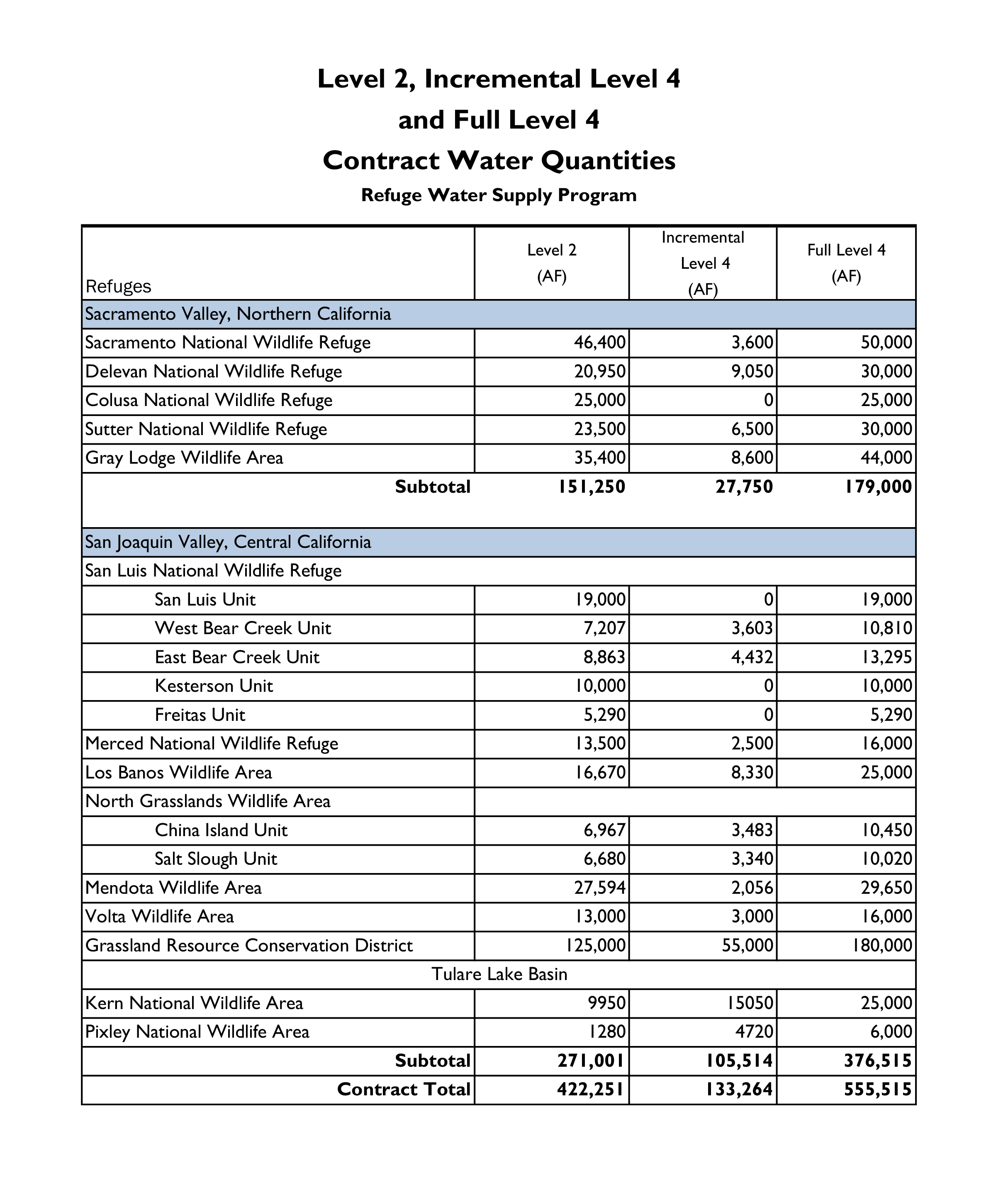
RWSP Contract Quantities

=== The Water ===
The water associated with the program is either categorized as Level 2 or Incremental Level 4 and there are different supply quantities and characteristics of each. The goal of the program is to provide the 'Full Level 4' water quantity which is the cumulative sum of the full quantity of each category for each Refuge. Program-wide, typically between 75% and 85% of Full Level 4 is delivered annually.

The water the RWSP provides accounts for varying portions of an individual Refuge's total water supply. Because some Refuges do not have adequate conveyance capacity to them (Pixley NWR, Merced NWR, Sutter NWR, East Bear Creek Unit and Gray Lodge WA) delivered water supplies vary annually with hydrological and climatic conditions. Construction projects enabling these Refuges to receive water supplies have been identified and in some cases are progressing but funding limitations will likely cause this condition to persist.

==== Full Level 4 ====
The amount of water identified as being required for the optimal management of a designated wetland is defined as that refuge's 'Full Level 4' quantity. The 555,515AF of water the RWSP is tasked with providing is the sum of all of the specified refuges' Full Level 4 quantities. Full Level 4 is a contractually obligated amount of water that consists of 2 blocks, Level 2 and Incremental Level 4. Each refuge has a 'Full Level 4' quantity which is the sum of its total Level 2, and total Incremental Level 4 quantity of water. These amounts are provided in the table "RWSP Contract Water Quantities".

==== Level 2 Water ====
Each of the 19 benefiting Refuges has its own Level 2 water quantity which is based on the average water supplies necessary to maintain the wetland areas in existence prior to the passing of the CVPIA or equate to its prior dependably delivered quantity (regardless of water quality) and collectively totals 422,251 AF. For this reason, the delivery of a Refuge's Level 2 allocation is considered to be essential for a Refuge's successful operation.

For those refuges that have the infrastructure to receive it, Level 2 water comes from the CVP, meaning a fixed portion of the federal water supply stored and delivered by the CVP Project is automatically dedicated annually for Refuge use and thus provides a perennially reliable water source. The RWSP manages and funds several long-term contracts (5 – 40 years) with a variety of water agencies to convey this water from its CVP source to a Refuges' boundaries.

Tthe individual Refuges determine the amount of this water to be delivered, per month, at their discretion. This is a unique condition because most CVP water contracts impose limitations on both the total monthly delivery amount and the months in which deliveries may occur.

==== Incremental Level 4 Water ====
The incremental difference between the Refuges' Full Level 4 allocation and its Level 2 allocation defines Incremental Level 4 (IL4) and represents the quantity of water necessary for Refuges to ideally manage all lands identified in the refuge reports for the benefit of waterfowl. In most cases, IL4 water is needed to fully support an expanded wetland footprint. Like Level 2 water, each refuge has its own Incremental Level 4 quantity but unlike Level 2 supplies, this water is not dedicated from CVP supply and must be acquired from other sources, such as willing sellers or from those relinquishing their federal or state supplies. The RWSP manages and funds contracts of varied duration to acquire and convey this water from its source to the refuges' boundaries. The suppliers, availability, and cost of water available as Incremental Level 4 are less predictable than Level 2 supplies because of unpredictable region-wide water needs and usage; the potential lack of sufficient conveyance infrastructure; inconsistent annual natural conditions, specifically rainfall; and occasional water quality concerns.

Additionally, Individual refuges retain the right to refuse to accept water that the RWSP has the ability to acquire if it is not of suitable quality or does not benefit the refuge at the time it is available. Thus, water supplied delivered in a year may be less than those that were potentially available.

=== RWSP Program Components ===
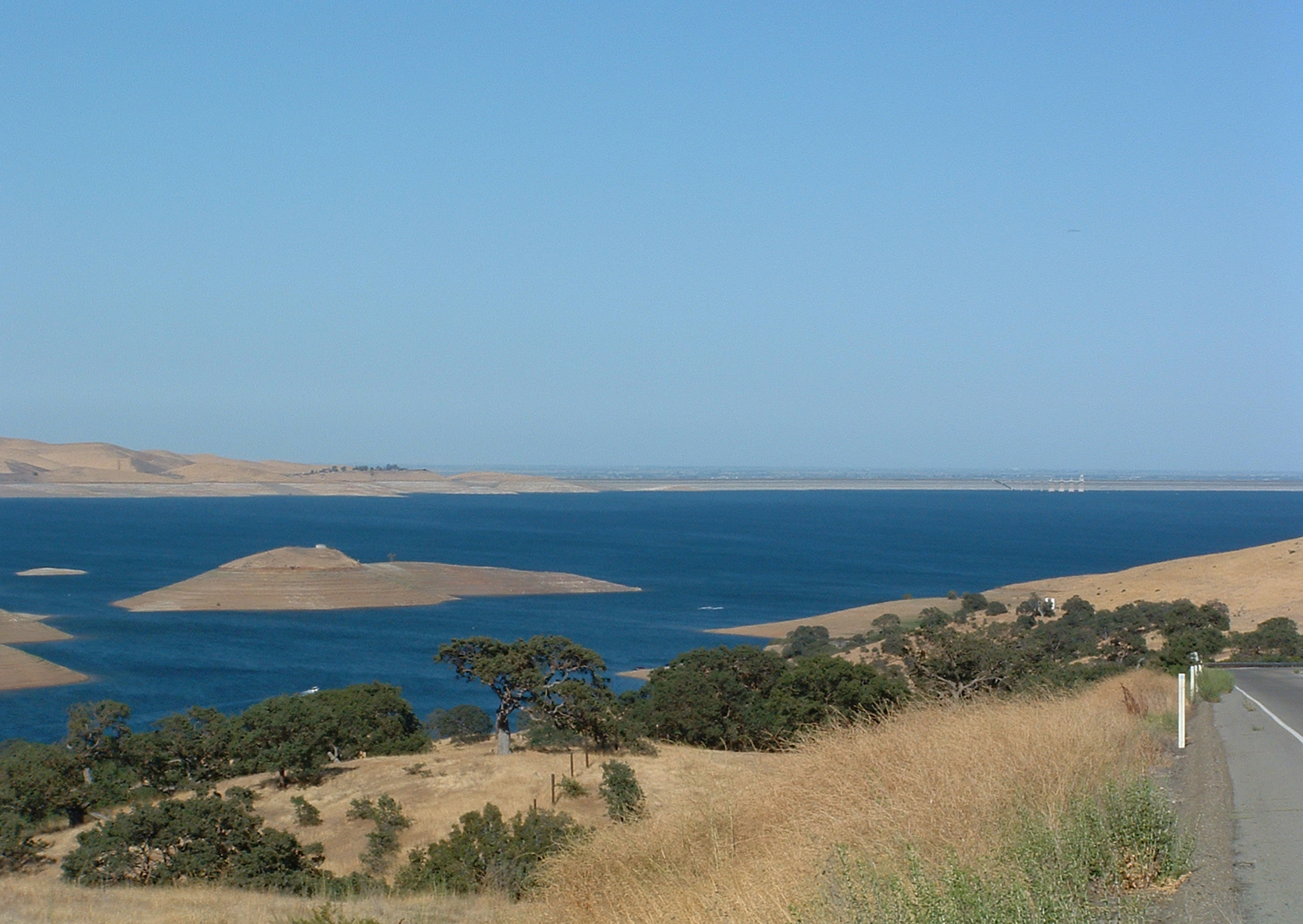
The San Luis Reservoir is a storage facility that holds water destined for many refuges in the San Joaquin Valley and other uses.

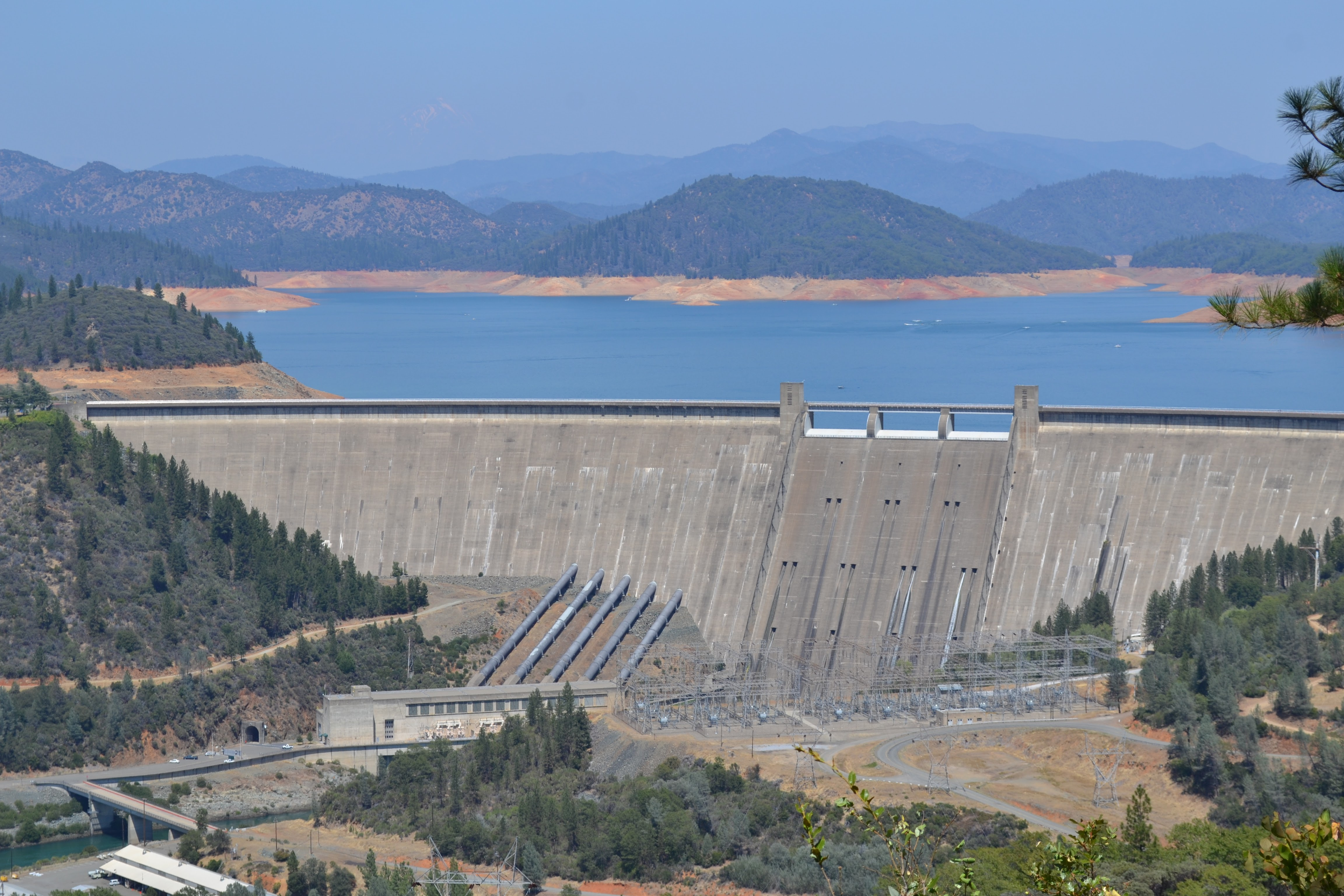
Lake Shasta is the ultimate source of much of the refuges' Level 2 Water Supply

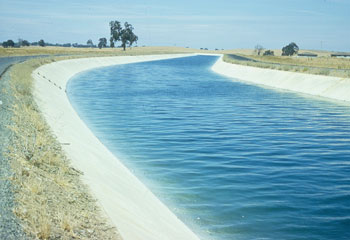
A Portion of the Delta Mendota Canal

The RWSP's efforts are concentrated into 3 components, Water Acquisition, Facility Construction and Water Conveyance.

==== Water Acquisitions ====
CVPIA Section 3406(d)(2) requires the acquisition of IL4 Water for critical wetland habitat supporting resident and migratory waterfowl, threatened and endangered species, and wetland-dependent aquatic biota on the Refuges. These supplies are ideally used to allow refuges to optimally manage the preserved land for the improvement of waterfowl populations.

IL4 water consists of long-term and annual purchases from willing sellers of both surface and groundwater supplies; supplies at no cost, e.g., water exchanges; water delivered under a mitigation agreement with the Federal Energy Regulatory Commission and 'permanent water', water that the program has purchased a permanent right to take under specific conditions.

===== North Valley Regional Recycled Water Program =====
California, and the Central Valley, experienced persistent drought conditions for much of the early part of the twenty-first century. With global warming expected to alter historic conditions, the long-term availability of IL4 supplies is questionable. To meet its acquisition and delivery mandate the RWSP was challenged to find reliable and affordable sources for Incremental 4 water to deliver to the refuges well into this uncertain future. The North Valley Regional Recycled Water Program will make treated, recycled water from the Cities of Turlock and Modesto available for re-use at the Refuges. The RWSP took an active role in this pioneering program's development and in return, in 2016, signed a 40-year contract for water deliveries from it.

==== Facility Construction ====
CVPIA Section 3406(d)(5) provides for facilities construction to benefit the mandate of supplying refuge water. This component funds projects that identify, construct and/or maintain infrastructure projects supporting the long-term delivery of firm, reliable water supplies to the boundary of the Refuges. The RWSP's goal is to have the necessary facilities in place allowing for the delivery of Full L4 water supplies to the Refuges that meet their timing and scheduling requirements. A total of 46 new or modifications to major structures and/or actions were identified to provide needed capacity for the delivery of Full Level 4 surface supplies to these refuges.

==== Water Conveyance (Wheeling) ====
CVPIA Sections 3406(d)(1),(2) and (5) of the CVPIA describe the functions and responsibilities of the Refuge Water Conveyance (Wheeling) Component. The use of a water conveyance facility by someone other than the owner or operator to transport water is referred to as "wheeling." The conveyance component is responsible for ensuring the delivery of a refuge's level 2 and acquired water supplies through contracts and agreements that allow for these water supplies to move from source to refuge destination.

The reservoirs that hold water destined for a refuge are connected to the refuges by a network of channels, owned and operated by multiple entities. Similar to a network of roadways there are conveyance channels of many kinds (with names like aqueduct, canal, slough, and ditch) and sizes. Some channels are free to use by the RWSP, like rivers, and some require payment, such as those built and maintained by a water district. The RWSP negotiated contracts coordinating the delivery of water. Reclamation currently has nine long-term (15–50 years) conveyance agreements that are administered by the RWSP, one Service 40-year conveyance agreement, cooperative agreements to reimburse delivering entities for costs of conveying L2 and IL4 water supplies through federal, state, and private water distribution systems to the refuges and agreements to reimburse costs for groundwater pumping in instances where groundwater is pumped at the refuge itself. Deliveries are monitored throughout the system as water enters and exits metered channels.

Water that is transferred any distance suffers what is termed 'conveyance losses' which means that the amount of water released at the start is not the same amount that ultimately arrives. The difference between what is sent versus what is received is conveyance loss and can be the result of evaporation or seepage (soaking into the land). In some cases, water travels over 300 miles to reach its final refuge destination.

== Accomplishments and Benefits to Nature ==
The CVPIA was enacted to increase the population and improve the health of the Central Valley's anadromous fish and increase the acreage and health of wetlands used by migratory birds and other resident wildlife both of which suffered as a result of the construction of the CVP. The RWSP focuses on the health of wetlands by acquiring and conveying necessary water supplies. Since CVPIA was enacted numerous biological benefits have resulted from supplying the Refuges with a reliable year-round water supply that adequately meets the refuge-specific water delivery schedules developed for individual wetland management requirements. Prior to CVPIA, refuge managers had to concentrate the majority of their water use in the fall and early winter months, when Central Valley waterfowl numbers peaked. With the passage of CVPIA, the habitat calendar was expanded to the full year. These increased and reliable supplies of water enable managers to enhance existing habitats, expand their wetland base, and provide increased benefits to a greater number of wetland-dependent species.

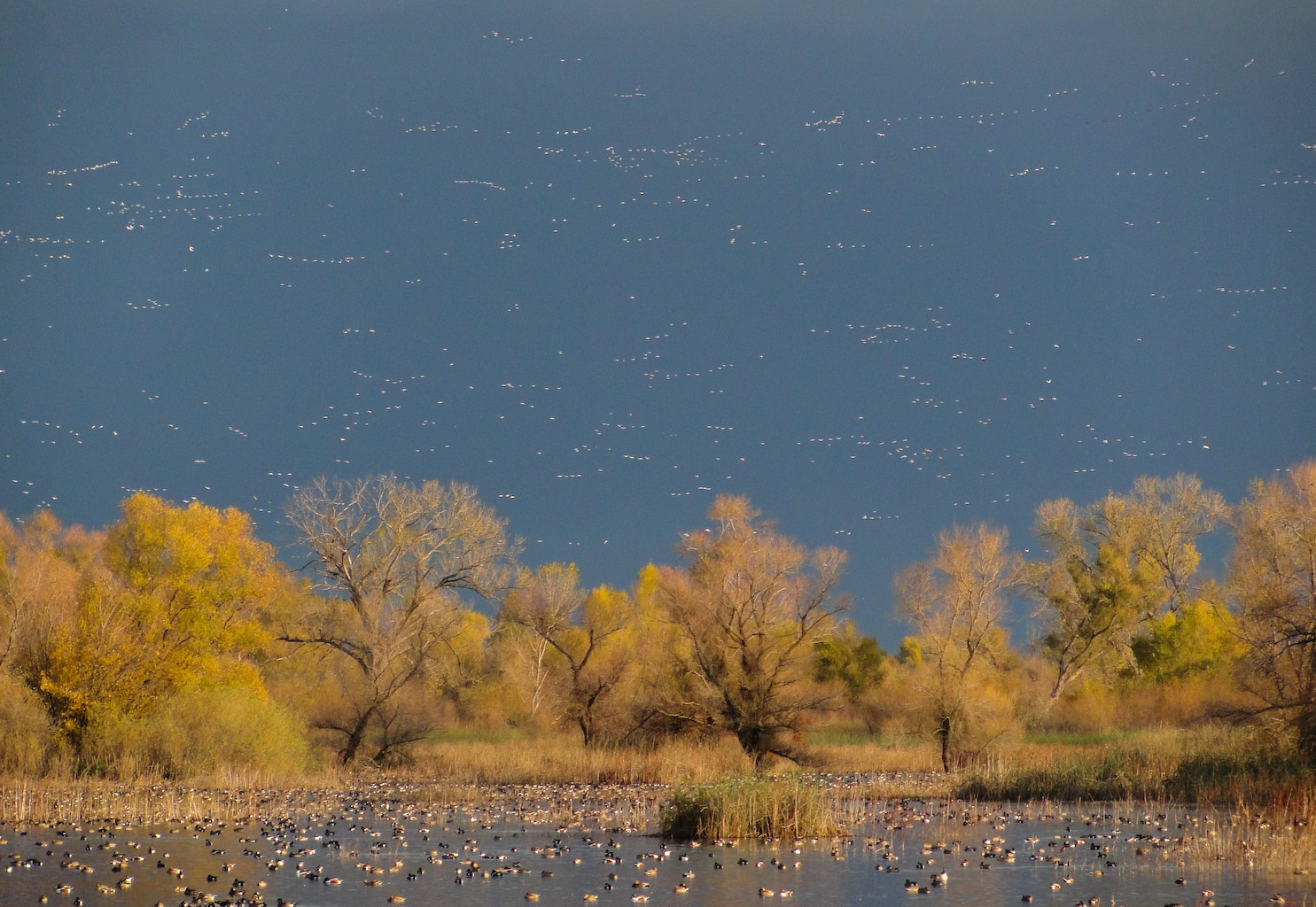
Gray Lodge Wildlife Area

=== Habitat and Biodiversity ===
Refuge activities are water dependent. Having a firm and adequate supply of water available when most beneficial throughout the year enables managers to implement improved management techniques and allows them to better manage lands and activities. This increased efficiency and reliability have both increased wetland acreage and improved wetland health by affording refuge managers with the ability to manage a diverse mix of habitat types that more fully satisfied the year-round environmental requirements of many wildlife species.

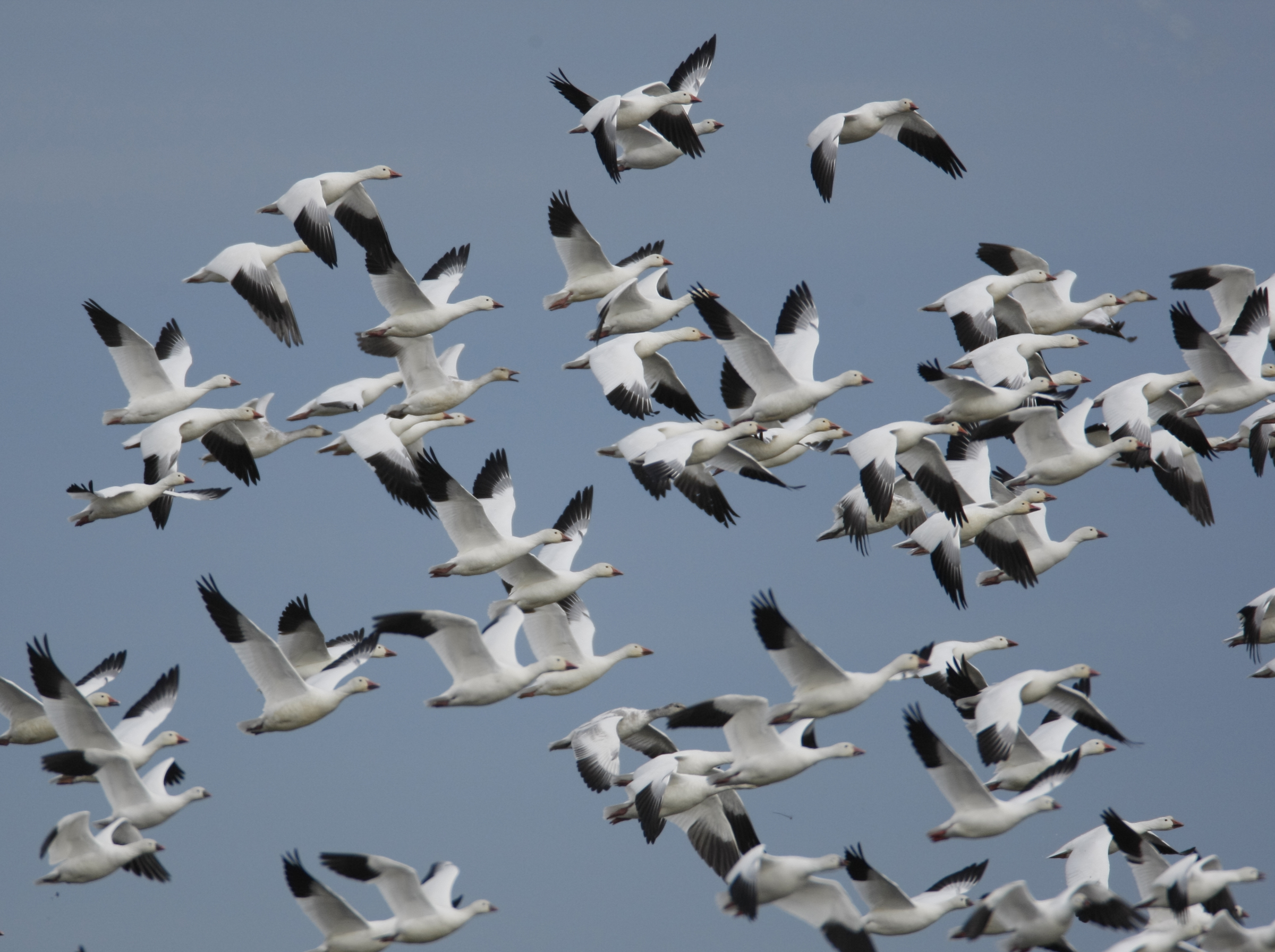
Snow Geese and Ross Geese at the Sacramento National Wildlife Refuge

==== Benefits of Water Reliability ====
Before the CVPIA, refuge managers concentrated the majority of water use in the fall and early winter months (October - December), when Central Valley waterfowl numbers peaked. With the passage of CVPIA, the habitat calendar was expanded to the full year, allowing refuge managers' the ability to provide habitat to an extended group of migratory birds as well as other wildlife and grow plant materials that provide a food supply or habitat for food sources. Under CVPIA programs, moist soil food plant irrigations are carried out since water is reliably available during August and September to satisfy the needs of the early arriving migrant waterfowl and shorebirds, maintenance flows are applied throughout the winter months to improve water quality and decrease avian disease outbreaks, and during spring and summer, when wetland habitat can be particularly limited by hydrology, water provides critical nesting habitat for waterfowl and colonial birds as well as habitat for resident wildlife and their young. Wintering wildlife also benefits from this habitat diversity, as seasonal wetlands are now managed to coincide with peak migration times of shorebirds and waterfowl.

With the increased frequency and acreage of irrigated moist soil food plants, there has been a doubling in desirable plant biomass, which equates to more high-quality, high-energy food available to waterfowl. In some refuges, waterfowl food production has increased tenfold. Timely de-watering and irrigation promote the germination and irrigation of important moist-soil food plants, such as swamp timothy and watergrass. These plants provide a high-energy food source through both their seeds and associated invertebrate communities. The increase in supply reliability allows wetland managers to lower water depths to make seeds and invertebrates available without the fear of having wetlands completely evaporate.

==== Benefits of Increased Wetland Acreage ====
Waterfowl, shorebirds, and other wetland-dependent wildlife have benefited as their habitats have been expanded and enhanced. Central Valley wetlands receiving CVP water supplies have increased by more than 20,000 acres since the passage of the CVPIA while tens of thousands of acres of habitat have been enhanced. This wetland acreage helps explain the 75% decrease in waterfowl disease-related mortality in some wetland areas as the birds spread out over a greater area.

==== Benefits of Improved Water Quality ====
At least as important as the increase in acreage, improvement in the quality of previously existing wetlands that has resulted from the delivery of suitable water. Increasing water supplies to wetlands also has the effect of improving water quality, both on and off refuges. For example, providing firm, quality water supplies has reduced the exposure of waterfowl and shorebirds spending the winter in the Grasslands area of the valley to contaminants. In a report on selenium in aquatic birds from the Central Valley, 1986-1994, FWS scientists noted that application of freshwater resulted in the decline of selenium contamination. Improved maintenance water flows through refuge ponds to improve water quality and reduce avian disease. The ability to battle avian disease outbreaks, such as botulism and cholera, is greatly assisted by applying additional water and creating a "flow-through" system of water delivery and drainage. This "flow-through" also helps deal with wetland areas high in salinity, which are often lower in productivity and diversity. CVPIA water allows wetland managers to "flush" salts from wetland basins and improve soil quality.

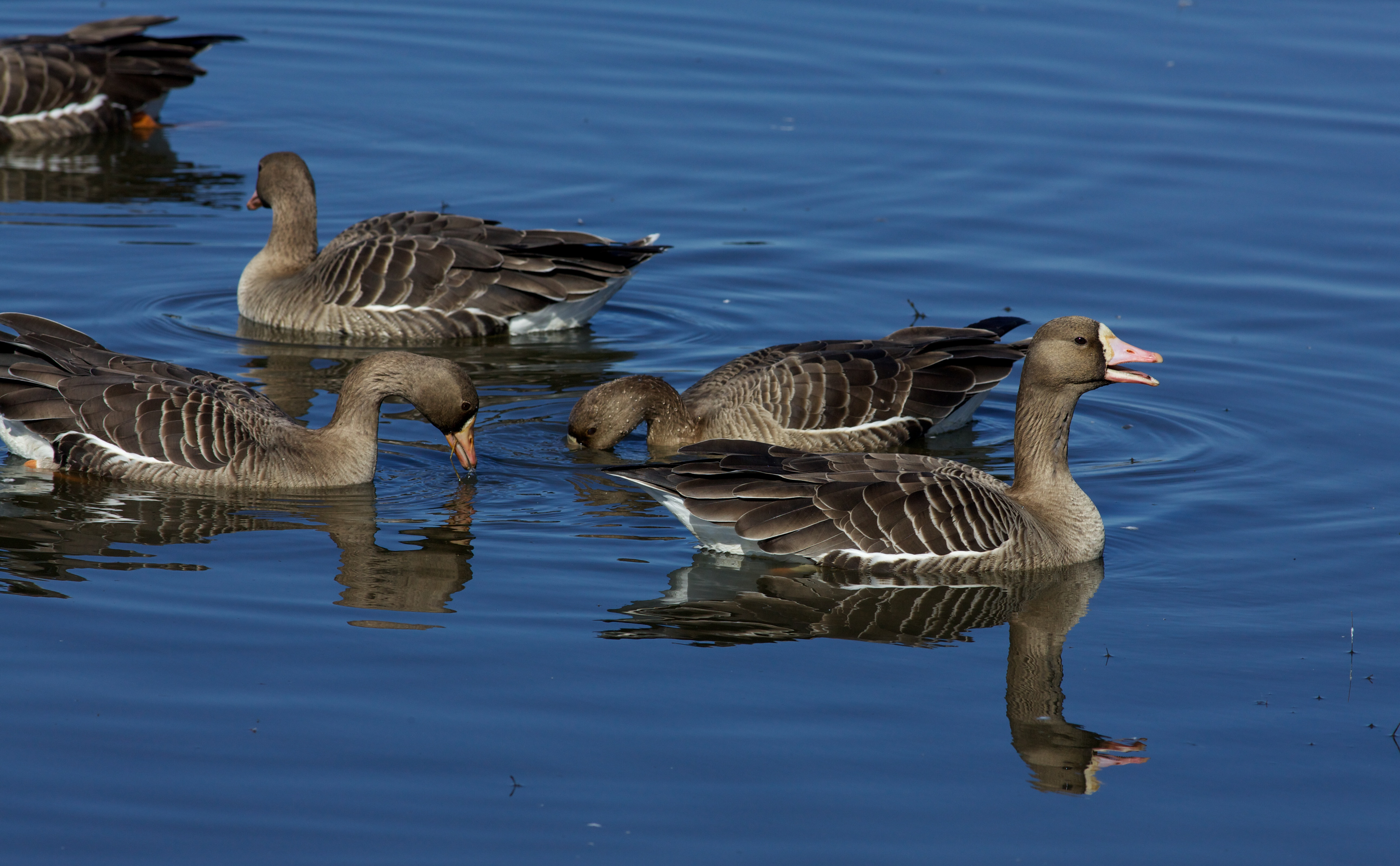
Greater White Fronted Geese at Colusa National Wildlife Refuge

=== Migratory Waterfowl ===
Since the passage of the CVPIA, Sacramento Valley areas receiving CVP water have seen a 20% increase in waterfowl use and a significant decline in water-borne wildlife diseases. Waterfowl use in the early fall has recorded increases of 800 percent, from 2 million to over 18 million waterfowl use days per year.

White-faced Ibis and Sandhill Cranes are excellent examples of how the availability of adequate water supplies enabled refuge managers to provide habitat for endemic species that had been in severe decline for decades. Improved water supplies first led to an increase in the numbers of frogs, snails, aquatic insects, and small fish. This, in turn, provided the ibis and cranes with habitat for late-spring and summer nesting, essential components for these species. The increased and improved breeding habitat resulted in a steady upswing in bird numbers.

This, in turn, provided the ibis and cranes with habitat for late-spring and summer nesting, essential components for these species. The increased and improved breeding habitat resulted in a steady upswing in bird numbers.

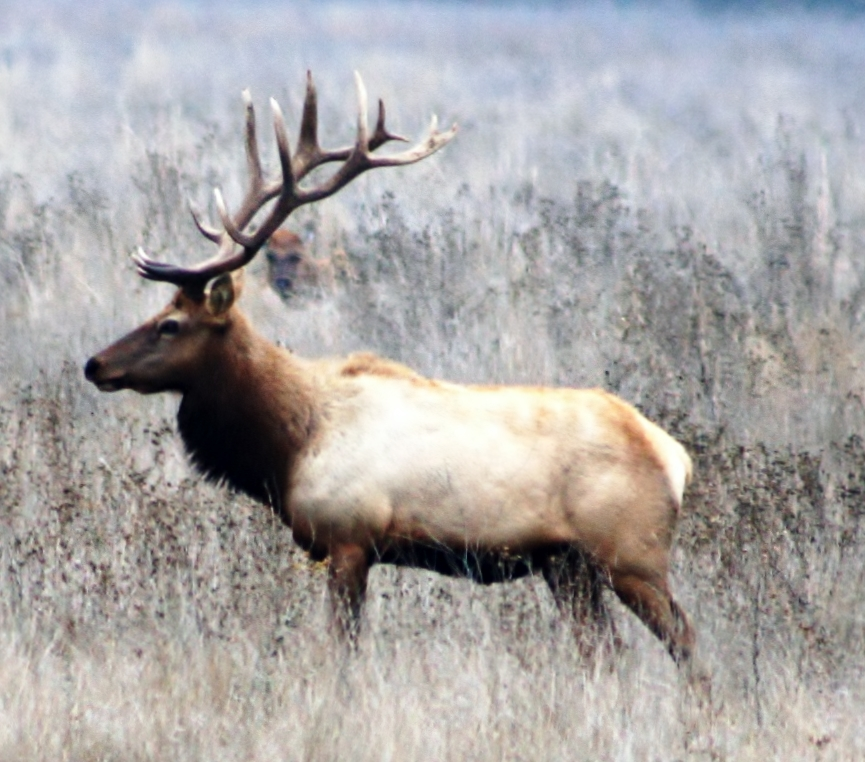
Tule Elk at the Merced National Wildlife Refuge

=== Other Wildlife ===
Wetlands are diverse ecosystems. The increased wetland acreage and improved water quality have benefited more than bird populations. Improved water supplies led to an increase in the numbers of frogs, snails, aquatic insects, and small fish. Habitat that is now available during the months of August and early September is utilized by resident wildlife and their young during a critical time of the year when wetland habitat is otherwise reduced. Introducing water for semi-permanent and permanent wetland habitats in the spring and summer directly benefits the recovery of special status species such as the giant garter snake and tri-colored blackbirds.

== Budget ==
The CVPIA is a federal program and receives funding every year through Congressional appropriation. It would require between $50 - $60 Million annually to achieve the goals of the RWSP. The 2017 budget provided approximately $22 million.
