= Gridley Unified School District =

School district in California, United States

Coordinates: 39.363139°N 121.691684°W

Gridley Unified School District (GUSD)

Location
- 429 Magnolia St Gridley, CA 95948 Gridley, California

District information
- Type: Public
- Grades: K-12
- Superintendent: Justin Kern

Other information

The Gridley Unified School District (GUSD) is a public primary and secondary education school district located in Gridley, California, a suburban town north of Sacramento, California and south of Chico, California. It consists of two elementary schools, one middle school, one high school, and one continuation high school.

== High schools ==
=== Gridley High School ===
Gridley High School is one of the two high schools in the Gridley Unified School District. The school was established in 1895 and has had an enrollment of about 670 students in the 2024-2025 school year. The principal of the school is Rikki-Lee Burresch and the vice principal is Emily Peery. The mascot of the school are the Bulldogs.

== Middle schools ==
=== Sycamore Middle School ===
Sycamore Middle School is the only middle school in the Gridley Unified School District. The school teaches grades 6-8 and has had about 423 students in the 2024-2025 school year. The principal of the school is Christopher Schmidt. The vice principal is Traci Dukes. The mascot of the school are the Bullpups.

== Elementary schools ==
=== McKinley Primary School ===
McKinley Primary School is one of the two elementary schools in the Gridley Unified School District. The school teaches grades K-1 and has had about 340 students in the 2024-2025 school year. The principal of the school is Rhiannon Treat. The mascot of the school are the Mallards.

=== Wilson Elementary School ===
Wilson Elementary School is one of the two elementary schools in the Gridley Unified School District. The school teaches grades 2-5 and has had about 544 students in 2024-2025 school year. The principal of the school is Minden King and the vice principal is Sarah Moore. The mascot of the school are the Rams.

== Continuation schools ==
=== Esperanza High School ===
Esperanza High School is one of the two high schools in the Gridley Unified School District and the only continuation school in the Gridley Unified School District. The school teaches grades 10-12 and has had about 23 students in 2024-2025 school year. The principal of the high school is Dr. Maggie Daugherty and the mascot of the school are the Eagles.
