= Durham High School (California) =

Location
- 9455 Putney Drive; Durham, California 95938; United States; 39°38′53″N 121°48′05″W

Information
- Established: 1922
- Status: Open
- School district: Durham Unified School District
- Principal: Marty Wilkes
- Teaching staff: 19.28 (FTE)
- Grades: 9–12
- Enrollment: 308 (2023-2024)
- Average class size: 85-95
- Student to teacher ratio: 15.98
- Campus type: Suburban
- Colour
- Mascot: Trojan
- Website: Durham High School

Durham High School is a public secondary school in Durham, California, United States. Durham High is located in the heart of an agricultural community. Durham High School's current enrollment is around 300 students.

== History ==
Durham High School was founded in 1922

== Campus ==
Durham High School is located on a 55 acres (220,000 m^{2}) campus that also contains the elementary, intermediate and continuation schools as well as the district offices.

== Extracurricular activities ==
Organizations available to Durham students include Big Sister Little Sister, Block D, California Scholarship Federation, Cinema Club, Girls Block, Harry Potter Club, FFA, and Interact.

Durham High School fields teams in interscholastic competition in baseball, basketball, cross country, football, golf, soccer, swimming, track and field, volleyball and wrestling. They compete in the California Interscholastic Federation Northern Section.

== Notable alumni ==
- Sergio C. Garcia, first undocumented immigrant to be admitted to the State Bar of California
