= Butte–Glenn Community College District =

2-year college administration unit in California, USA

Location
- 3536 Butte Campus Dr; Oroville, California 95965 United States
- Coordinates: 39°39′00″N 121°38′40″W

Other information
- Website: www.butte.edu

Butte–Glenn Community College District is a public school district based in Butte County, California. On May 1, 2014, Butte–Glenn Community College District was named one of fifty five higher education institutions under investigation by the Office of Civil Rights "for possible violations of federal law over the handling of sexual violence and harassment complaints" by President Barack Obama's White House Task Force To Protect Students from Sexual Assault.
