= Cal Northern School of Law =

Private law school in Chico, California, US

- Established: 1983
- School type: Private Law School
- Dean: Sandra L. Brooks
- Location: Chico, CA, US; 39°46′28″N 121°50′21″W
- Enrollment: 63
- Faculty: 20 (Full-time and adjunct)
- Bar pass rate: 75.7%
- Website: www.calnorthern.edu

The Cal Northern School of Law is a private law school located in Chico, California. Cal Northern offers a four-year night program.

The law school is ranked 25 on the LA Times' list of law schools in California by the number of degrees awarded in 2026.

== History ==
Founded in 1983, Cal Northern School of Law was created by a group of attorneys and judges looking to create an evening law school.

== Accreditation ==
The school has been approved by the Committee of Bar Examiners of the State Bar of California since 1992, but is not accredited by the American Bar Association.

== Law clinic ==
Since 2015, there has been a legal self-help clinic on the Chico campus, available for community-use every spring.

== Notable alumni ==
- Sergio C. Garcia, first undocumented immigrant to be admitted to the State Bar of California
- Rick Keene, former member of the California State Assembly
