= Butte College =

Community college in Oroville, expanded to Orland, and Chico, California, US

Coordinates: 39°38′52″N 121°38′39″W

- Type: Public community college
- Established: 1967
- Parent institution: Butte-Glenn Community College District, California Community Colleges system
- President: Virginia L. Guleff
- Students: 12,669
- Location: Oroville, California, U.S.
- Colors: Black & gold
- Sporting affiliations: CCCAA – GVC
- Mascot: Roadrunner
- Website: www.butte.edu

Butte College is a public community college in the Butte-Glenn Community College District based in Oroville, California. Since its founding in 1967, it has expanded to Chico, and Orland.

== History ==
After the passage of the 1960 Donahoe Act, the voters of Butte County created a local community college district in 1966 to serve the educational and vocational needs of its citizens. In 1967, Butte College began by offering law enforcement, fire science, and vocational nursing classes in various locations throughout Butte County. The college initially operated from a temporary campus in Durham, leasing former high school facilities. In its first year, Butte College welcomed nearly 2,000 students with a strong emphasis on career education and transfer pathways.

In 1968, the board of trustees named the institution "Butte College". That same year, the college selected a permanent campus site at Pentz and Clark Roads in Oroville, an area chosen for its central location within Butte County. Glenn County joined the district shortly after.

== Campus ==
The campus rests on a wildlife refuge, and has been recognized as a national community college leader in sustainability, winning the grand prize 2008 National Wildlife Federation's Chill Out Contest and the 2009 National Campus Sustainability Leadership Award.

== Student Life ==
Student demographics as of Fall 2023
Race and ethnicity	Total
White	48%
Hispanic	34%
Asian	6%
Multiracial	6%
African American	2%
American Indian/Alaska Native	2%
Unknown	2%

== Gallery ==
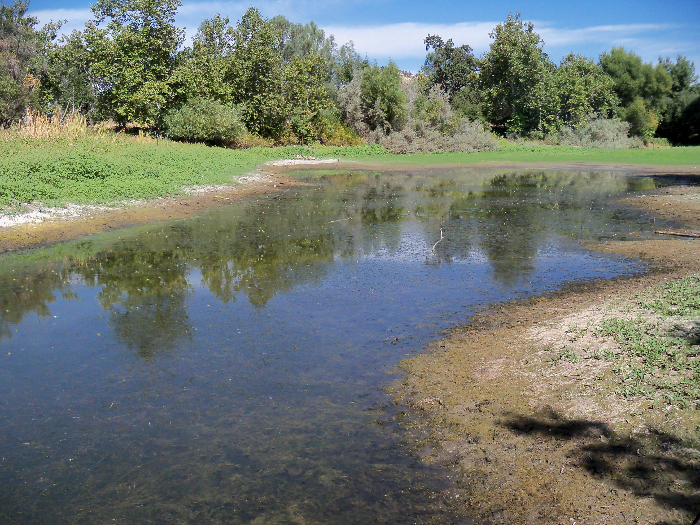
Butte College Wildlife Refuge

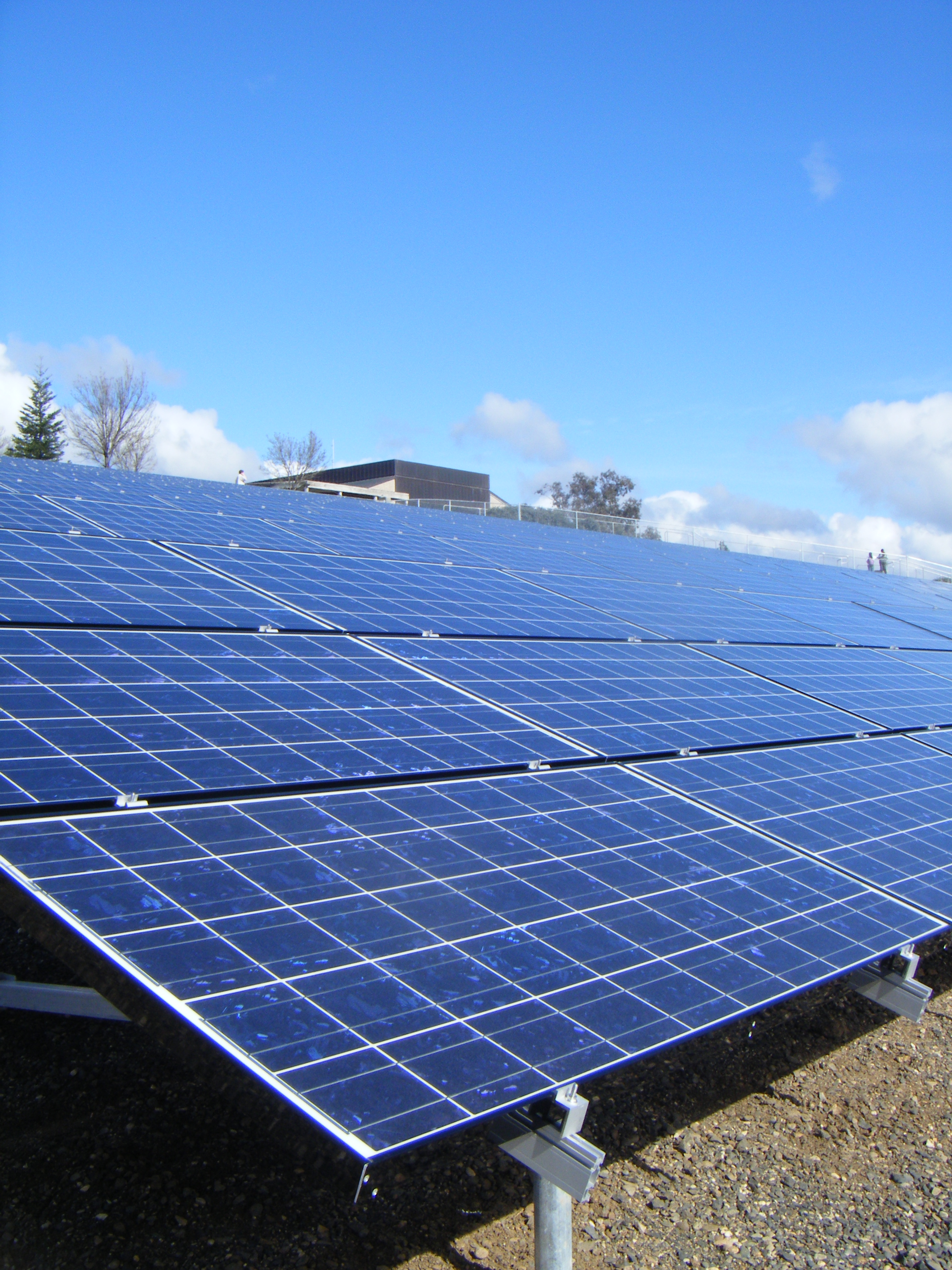
One of five solar array projects

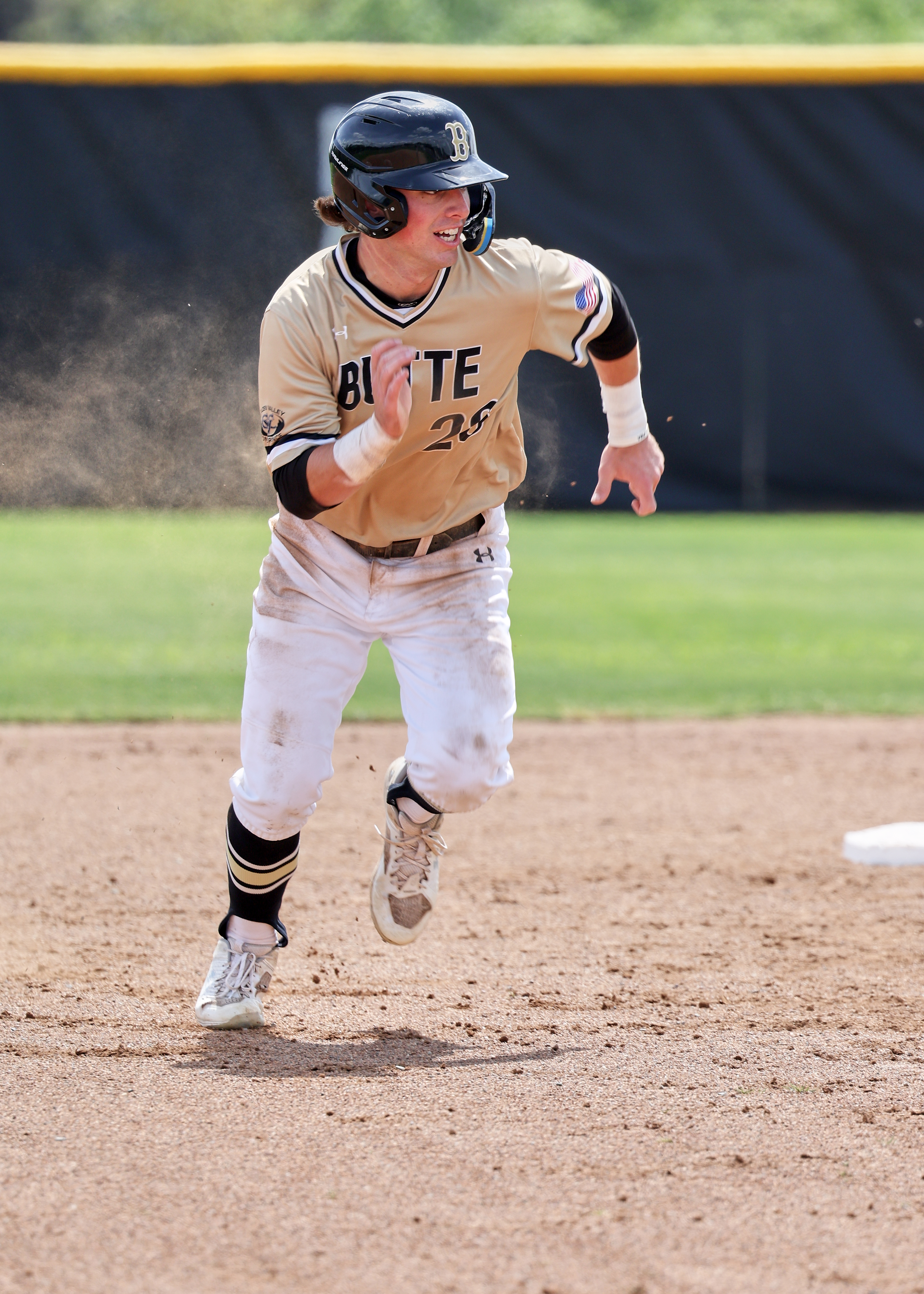
Butte Roadrunners baseball team

== Notable alumni ==
- Larry Allen, professional football player
- Malcolm DeWalt IV, professional football player
- Justin Eilers, professional mixed martial arts fighter
- Lisa Fortier, college basketball coach
- Sergio C. Garcia, attorney and first undocumented immigrant admitted to State Bar of California
- Ken Grossman, businessman
- Mike Kyle, mixed martial arts fighter
- Aaron Rodgers, professional football player
- Geoff Swaim, professional football player
