= Durham, California =

- Census-designated place
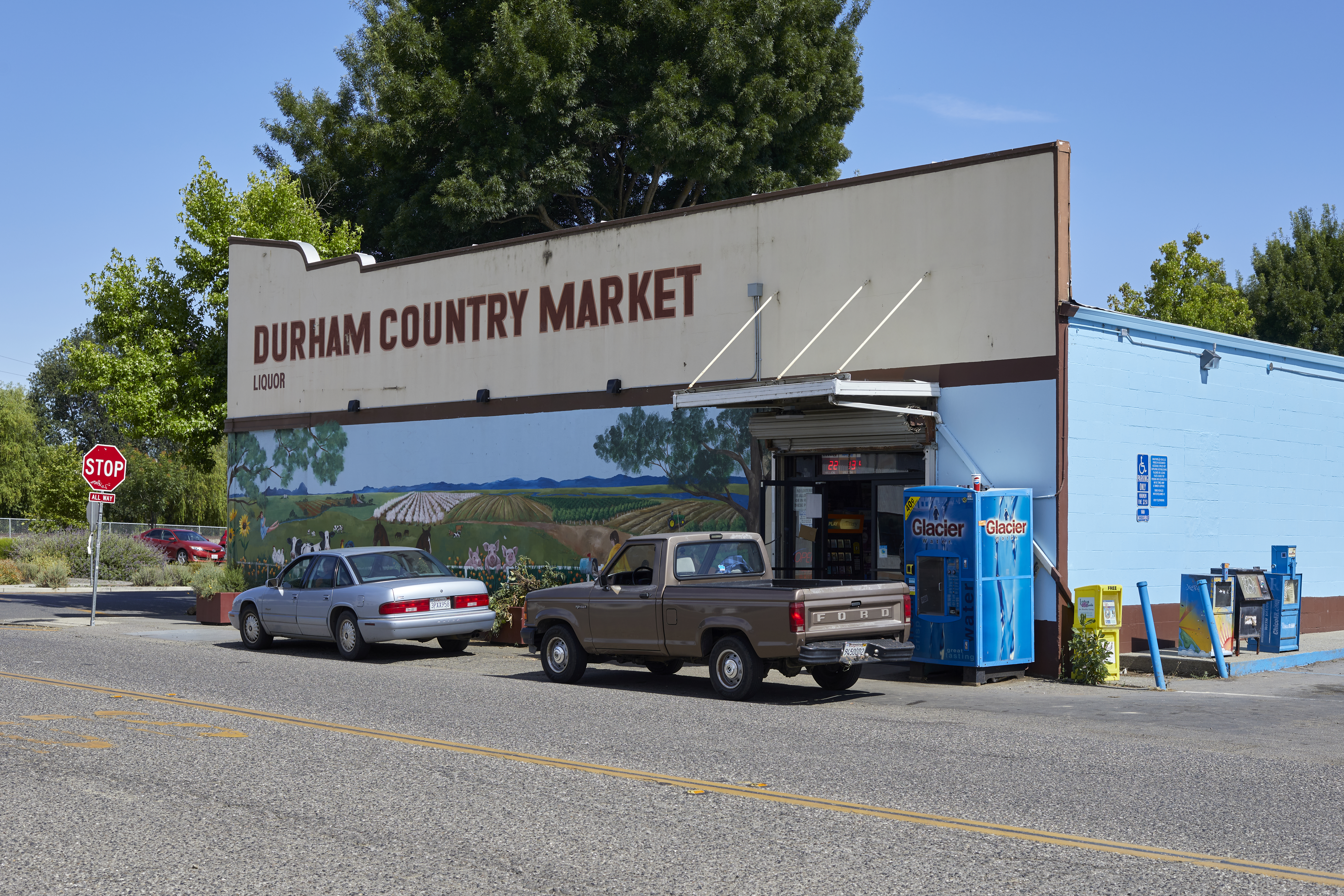
- Durham Country Market in June 2020

- Location in Butte County and the State of California

- Location in the United States
- Coordinates: 39°38′24″N 121°47′52″W
- Country: United States
- State: California
- County: Butte

Government
  - State Senator: Megan Dahle (R)
  - State Assembly: Vacant
  - U. S. Congress: James Gallagher (R)

Area
  - Total: 81.84 sq mi (211.96 km^{2})
  - Land: 81.69 sq mi (211.57 km^{2})
  - Water: 0.15 sq mi (0.39 km^{2}) 0.19%
- Elevation: 161 ft (49 m)

Population (2020)
  - Total: 5,834
  - Density: 71.4/sq mi (27.58/km^{2})
- Time zone: UTC-8 (PST)
  - Summer (DST): UTC-7 (PDT)
- ZIP codes: 95938, 95958
- Area codes: 530, 837
- FIPS code: 06-20270
- GNIS feature IDs: 0277502; 2408696

Durham is a census-designated place (CDP) in Butte County, California, United States. The population was 5,834 at the 2020 census.

== Geography ==
According to the United States Census Bureau, the CDP has a total area of 81.8 square miles (212 km^{2}), of which 81.7 square miles (212 km^{2}) is land and 0.15 square miles (0.39 km^{2}) (0.19%) is water. Durham's main agricultural products are almonds and walnuts.

=== Climate ===
According to the Köppen Climate Classification system, Durham has a warm-summer Mediterranean climate, abbreviated "Csa" on climate maps.

== History ==
Durham was built on the site of a former Maidu settlement known as Eskini (also, Erskins and Es-kin).

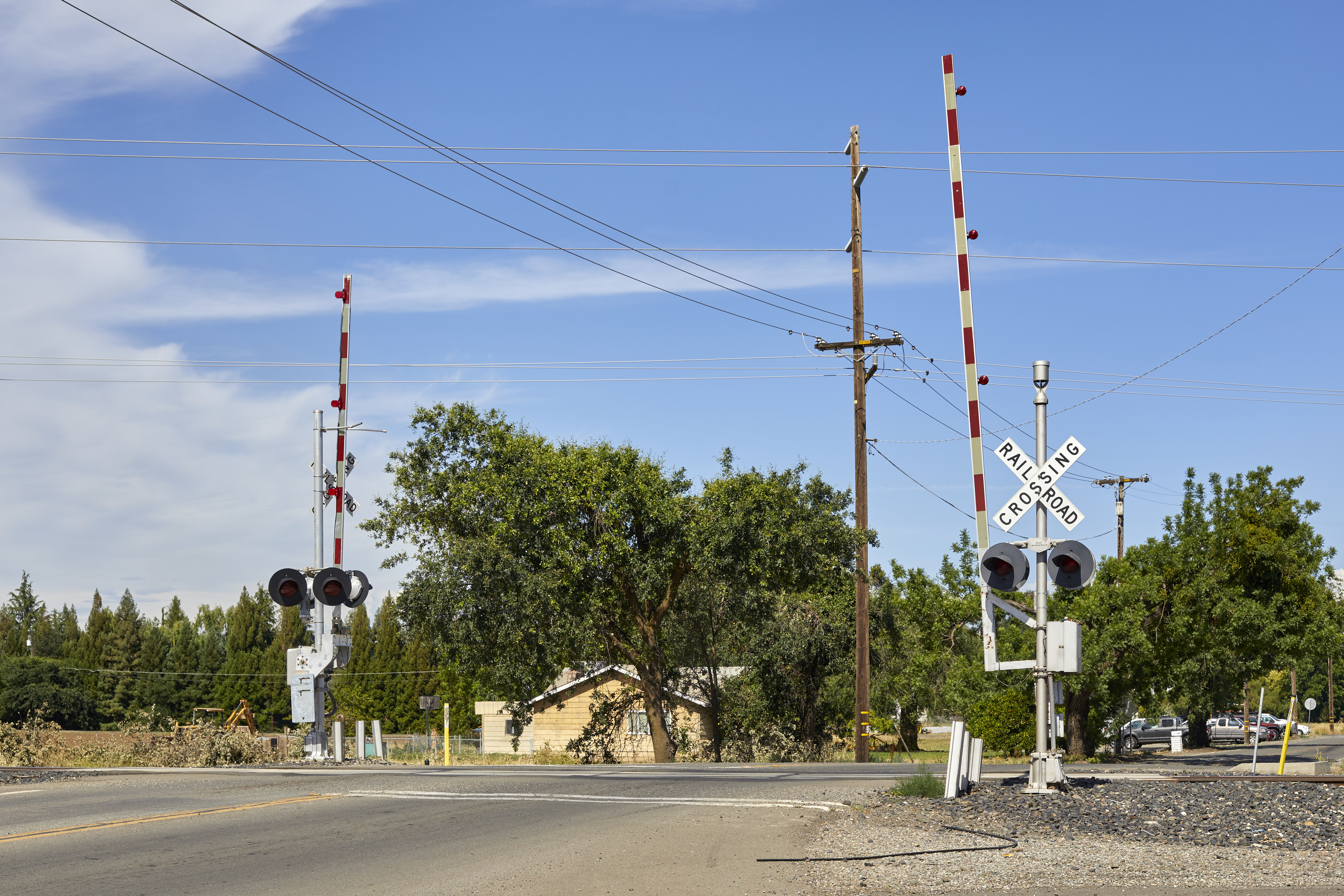
Railroad crossing in Durham

Durham was founded by the Durham Family. It is named for W. W. Durham, member of the California State Assembly. The Durham station on the California and Oregon Railroad was established in 1870. In the mid-1900s the Northern Electric Railway (later the Sacramento Northern Railway) built an electrified rail line through Durham. Both railroads served Durham for many years with both passenger and freight service; the Sacramento Northern line was removed by the 1980s, and the California and Oregon (now Union Pacific) railroad no longer stops in Durham. The Durham House is a reminder of what Durham was back in its early years. Durham grew considerably as the site of the first California State Land Settlement Colony, established by an act of the state legislature in 1917. The Durham Flour Mill, which burned down several times, was an integral part of this community.

Originally focused on cattle and sheep ranching, the Durham economy is strongly focused on almond production. The first almond trees in the area were planted experimentally in 1875, and on a commercial scale in 1895. Today, almonds, walnuts, and rice are the most important crops grown in the area.

On June 1, 2011, a tornado rated EF1, struck south of Durham, uprooting thousands of almond trees, destroying an out building and damaging a barn.

== Demographics ==
Historical population
Census	Pop.	Note	%±
1990	4,784		—
2000	5,220		9.1%
2010	5,518		5.7%
2020	5,834		5.7%
U.S. Decennial Census; 1990 2000 2010

Durham first appeared as a census-designated place in the 1990 United States census.

=== Racial and ethnic composition ===
Durham CDP, California – Racial and ethnic composition Note: the US Census treats Hispanic/Latino as an ethnic category. This table excludes Latinos from the racial categories and assigns them to a separate category. Hispanics/Latinos may be of any race.
Race / Ethnicity (NH = Non-Hispanic)	Pop 2000	Pop 2010	Pop 2020	% 2000	% 2010	% 2020
White alone (NH)	4,578	4,664	4,567	87.70%	84.52%	78.28%
Black or African American alone (NH)	7	17	35	0.13%	0.31%	0.60%
Native American or Alaska Native alone (NH)	31	48	50	0.59%	0.87%	0.86%
Asian alone (NH)	32	34	61	0.61%	0.62%	1.05%
Native Hawaiian or Pacific Islander alone (NH)	6	8	6	0.11%	0.14%	0.10%
Other race alone (NH)	9	16	43	0.17%	0.29%	0.74%
Mixed race or Multiracial (NH)	88	117	261	1.69%	2.12%	4.47%
Hispanic or Latino (any race)	469	614	811	8.98%	11.13%	13.90%
Total	5,220	5,518	5,834	100.00%	100.00%	100.00%

=== 2020 census ===
As of the 2020 census, Durham had a population of 5,834. The population density was 71.4 inhabitants per square mile (27.6/km^{2}). The median age was 45.3 years. The age distribution was 21.8% under the age of 18, 6.2% aged 18 to 24, 21.8% aged 25 to 44, 27.3% aged 45 to 64, and 23.0% who were 65 years of age or older. For every 100 females, there were 102.4 males, and for every 100 females age 18 and over there were 101.8 males age 18 and over.

The Census reported that 99.1% of the population lived in households, 0.6% lived in non-institutionalized group quarters, and 0.3% were institutionalized. 14.1% of residents lived in urban areas, while 85.9% lived in rural areas.

There were 2,172 households, out of which 30.3% included children under the age of 18, 61.6% were married-couple households, 6.0% were cohabiting couple households, 17.7% had a female householder with no partner present, and 14.6% had a male householder with no partner present. About 18.4% of all households were made up of individuals, and 9.4% had someone living alone who was 65 years of age or older. The average household size was 2.66. There were 1,643 families (75.6% of all households).

There were 2,264 housing units at an average density of 27.7 units per square mile (10.7 units/km^{2}), of which 2,172 (95.9%) were occupied. Of these, 72.0% were owner-occupied and 28.0% were occupied by renters. Of all housing units, 4.1% were vacant; the homeowner vacancy rate was 0.1% and the rental vacancy rate was 4.8%.

== Education ==
The vast majority of the CDP is served by the Durham Unified School District. A piece is in the Chico Unified School District. A very small portion extends into the Biggs Unified School District.
