= Camp Fire (2018) =

Wildfire in Northern California, US

- Part of the 2018 California wildfires
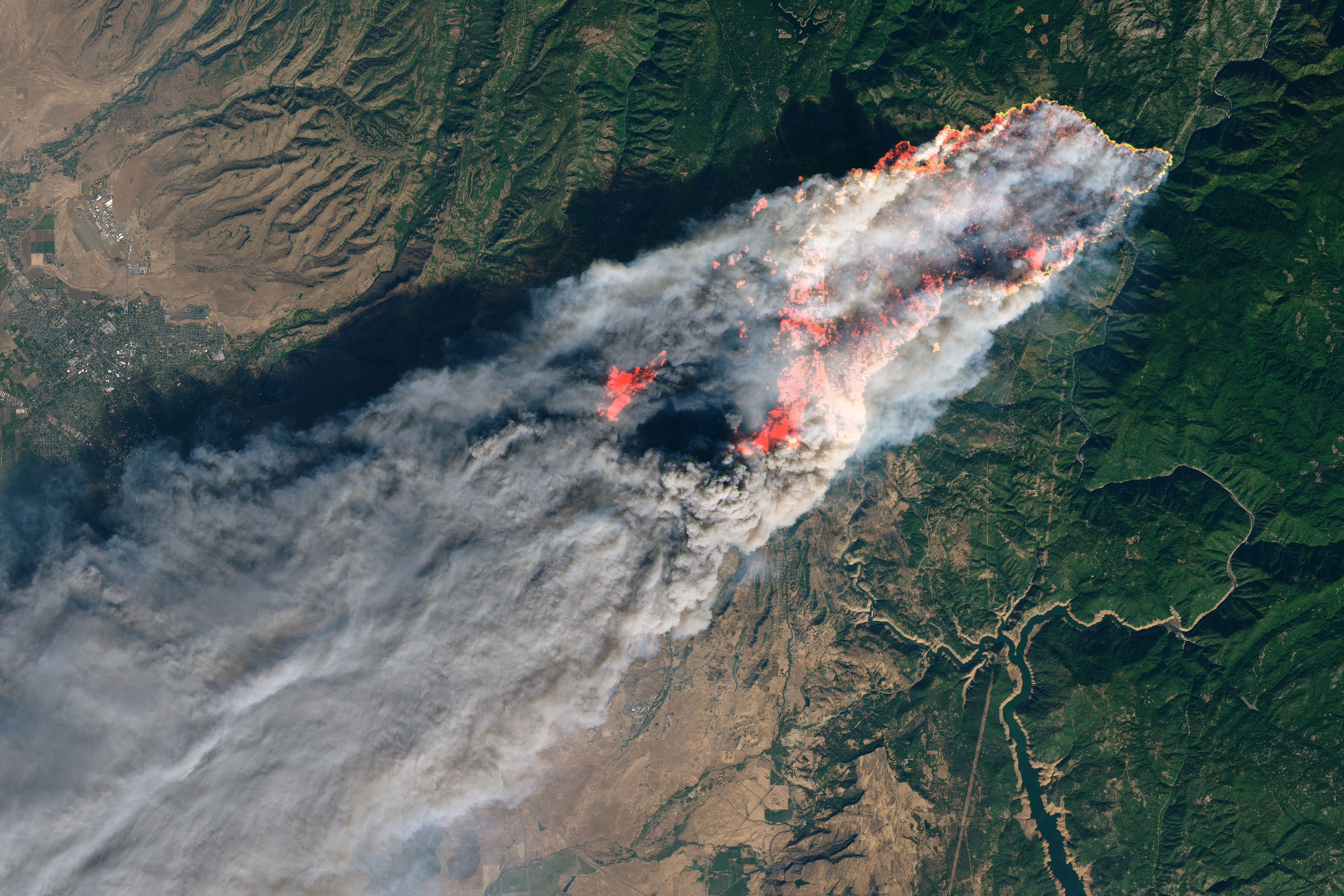
- The Camp Fire as seen from the Landsat 8 satellite on November 8, 2018, with red highlighting active fire seen in infrared light
- Date: November 8 –; November 25, 2018; (17 days)
- Location: Butte County, California, United States
- Coordinates: 39°48′37″N 121°26′14″W

Statistics
- Burned area: 153,336 acres (62,053 ha; 240 sq mi; 621 km^{2})

Impacts
- Deaths: 85
- Injuries: 17
- Missing people: 1
- Evacuated: 52,000 people
- Structures destroyed: 18,804
- Cost: $16.65 billion (2018 USD)

Ignition
- Cause: Electrical transmission fire from a PG&E power line

Map
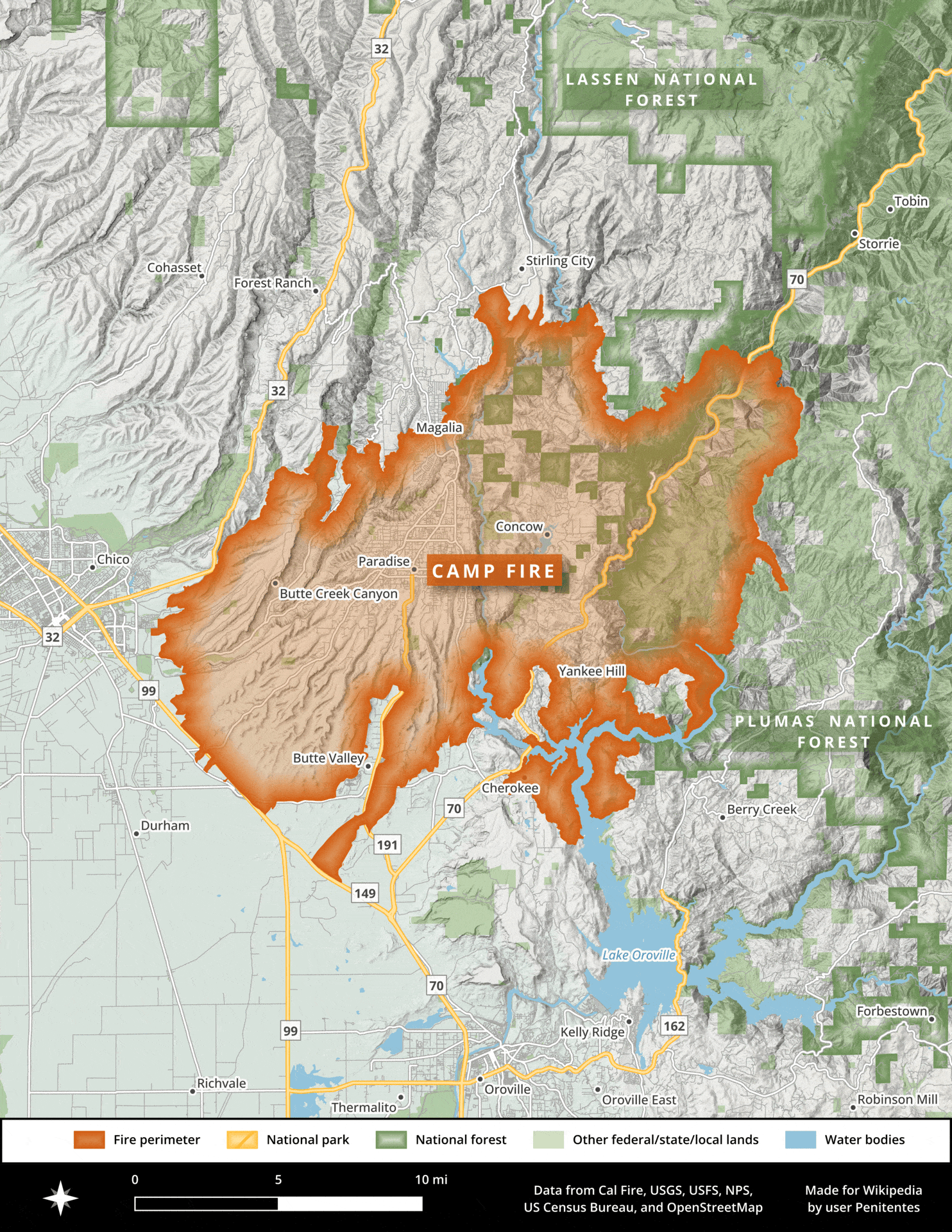
- The footprint of the Camp Fire, which burned from the Feather River Canyon to Highway 99

- The fire's general location in Butte County, Northern California

Interactive map of the Camp Fire perimeter

The 2018 Camp Fire in Northern California's Butte County was the deadliest and most destructive wildfire in California history. The blaze began on the morning of November 8, 2018 when hardware on a poorly maintained Pacific Gas and Electric Company (PG&E) transmission line in the Feather River Canyon failed during strong katabatic winds. Those winds rapidly drove the Camp Fire through the communities of Concow, Magalia, Butte Creek Canyon and Paradise, mostly destroying them. The fire burned for another two weeks and was finally contained on Sunday, November 25 after burning 153,336 acres (62,050 ha). The Camp Fire caused 85 fatalities, displaced more than 50,000 people and destroyed over 18,000 structures, and caused an estimated $16.5 billion in damage.

PG&E filed for bankruptcy in January 2019, citing expected wildfire liabilities of $30 billion. On December 6, 2019, the utility made a settlement offer of $13.5 billion for the wildfire victims as the offer covered several devastating fires caused by the utility, including the Camp Fire. On June 16, 2020, the utility pleaded guilty to 84 counts of involuntary manslaughter.

== Background ==
=== Fire hazard studies ===
The footprint of the Camp Fire had experienced 13 large wildfires since 1999. In 2008, the Humboldt Fire and the Butte Lightning Complex burned 100,000 acres (40,470 ha) on either side of Paradise, destroying hundreds of buildings in the region. In 2005, the California Department of Forestry and Fire Protection (Cal Fire) released a fire management plan for the region, which warned that the town of Paradise was at risk for an east wind-driven conflagration similar to the Oakland firestorm of 1991.

In June 2009, a Butte County civil grand jury report concluded that the roads leading from Paradise and Upper Ridge communities had "significant constraints" and "capacity limitations" on their use as evacuation routes. The report noted a combination of road conditions "which increases the fire danger and the possibility of being closed due to fire and or smoke", namely sharp curves, inadequate shoulders, and fire hazards adjacent to shoulders, such as "fire fuel and steep slopes". The report also recommended a moratorium on new home construction in fire-prone areas. In September 2009, the Butte County Board of Supervisors called the grand jury report "not reasonable", citing improved building codes and fire prevention requirements as arguments against a moratorium.

Despite these reports, Paradise city planners did not include study results in new plans. In 2009, the town of Paradise proposed a reduced number of travel lanes on the roadways and received state funding from the California Department of Transportation to implement a road diet along Skyway, Pearson Road, and Clark Road, three of the town's main thoroughfares and evacuation routes. Paradise planners opted in March 2015 to convert Skyway into a one-way route during emergencies, effectively doubling its capacity. Despite this change, the roads out of Paradise were only capable of evacuating around a fourth of the population within two hours.

=== Pre-fire prevention efforts ===
Residential development into wilderness areas, known as the wildland–urban interface (WUI), requires increased state resources to safeguard these communities. To recoup associated costs, California imposed a special fee on property owners in WUI zones; the fee was largely unpopular, with assemblyman Devon Mathis stating "not one cent has gone to putting more boots on the ground". The fee was suspended and repealed by the California State Legislature in July 2017.

Initially, much of the fire-fee revenue funded existing fire programs; the process of building out new prevention programs was slow, but the revenue did fund projects such as secondary evacuation routes and fuel reduction zones. In August 2018, three months before the fire, fire safe councils in the Paradise region were given $5 million in grants from the fire prevention programs to pay for fuel reduction and education projects.

Despite years of fuel reduction funded by special fees, numerous wildfires ravaged wildland–urban communities. Investigations found that PG&E power line failures during high winds had caused many of the fires. Utilities have the ability to disable dangerous power lines; however, the nearly 100-year-old transmission lines required intentional manual effort. PG&E shut off residential power to some customers, particularly in Paradise, in the days leading up to the fire. Following the 2017 North Bay fires, PG&E adopted a policy that precluded shutting off lines carrying more than 115 kV due to the number of customers who would be adversely affected by such a shutdown.

=== Infrastructure oversight inspection ===
The California Public Utilities Commission (CPUC) is responsible for inspecting PG&E's electrical infrastructure. The scope of the CPUC in relation to the scope of electrical infrastructure is unbalanced, however, and the CPUC has had difficulty fulfilling their oversight mandate.

A CPUC inspection of the section of the 115 kV Caribou-Palermo line at the origin of the Camp Fire had not been conducted in six years. Many of the electrical towers along the line are original to the Upper North Fork Feather River Project, which was constructed in the early 1900s. A 2009 inspection noted three-bolt connectors, used to join two conductors, were in need of replacement, which PG&E said had been done by 2016. In a 2011 audit, the CPUC found several thousand deficiencies, some of which PG&E disputed; it was not clear if the number of deficiencies on the Caribou-Palermo line were unusually high. A 2012 windstorm brought down five towers.

After the Camp Fire, the CPUC's Safety and Enforcement Table Mountain Division audited three years of the missing ten years of PG&E's records. Focusing on where the Camp Fire broke out, the audit found "the company was late in fixing 900 problems on its towers and other equipment, including two critical threats that regulators say languished more than 600 days before being repaired." In May 2018, the CPUC gave PG&E permission to replace the aging line, though the design did not include line hardening through high fire hazard areas.

=== Dry conditions ===
The winter of 2016–2017 saw above-average precipitation across much of California, ending a six-year statewide drought. One of the effects of the wet winter was the second spring in a row with an above-average grass crop. That winter was followed by that of 2017–2018, which was both hotter and drier than average, allowing for "fine fuels" such as grass to carry over from the previous year. A third consecutive above-average grass crop developed following a warm and wet March 2018. This was followed by the cessation of rain in late April, and a hot and dry summer in Northern California.

Paradise received only 0.88 inches (2.2 cm) of rain between May 1 and mid-November, when it typically received more than seven inches (18 cm). The U.S. Drought Monitor had logged Butte County in the "Abnormally Dry" category beginning in late June. By November 8, Butte County's lower elevations had gone more than 200 days without receiving one-half inch (1.3 cm) of rain. The energy release component (ERC), a metric for the dryness and flammability of vegetation, was above average all summer. As summer turned into fall and significant rain had not materialized by early October, ERC levels were well above average, and on the day of the start of the Camp Fire, they were setting records for the date. The National Fire Danger Rating System had four reporting stations in Butte County. On November 8, all of them reported fire danger ratings of "Very High" or "Extreme".

=== Katabatic winds ===
At the time of the fire's ignition, an upper-level atmospheric ridge (an elongated region of high pressure) was positioned off the coast of California. Its placement, allowing for northerly atmospheric flow, created an east–west pressure gradient. At the same time, a shortwave trough (a smaller-scale 'kink' of low pressure embedded in the flow) was moving over California, acting to intensify the pressure gradient. This created katabatic winds in many valleys in the western Sierra Nevada. Such winds form when the cool, high pressure airmass in the Great Basin spills through the narrow canyons that cut through the Sierra as it moves towards the warmer, low pressure airmass closer to the coast. The National Weather Service (NWS) described this as a "common synoptic pattern for strong winds and very dry conditions".

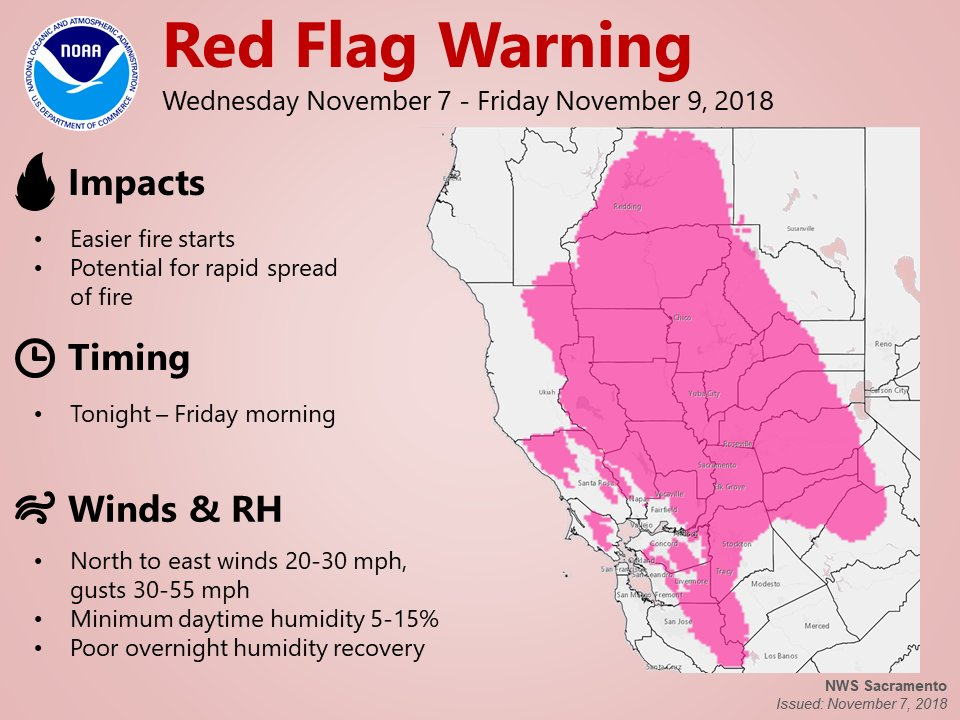
A graphic posted on November 7 by NWS Sacramento about the red flag warning in Northern California

The NWS office in Sacramento issued a fire weather watch on November 5, which was upgraded to a red flag warning on November 6. The warning was effective for the night of Wednesday, November 7, through the morning of Friday, November 9, and it called for relative humidity levels in the single digits and wind gusts of up to 55 miles per hour (89 km/h). The meteorologist-in-charge at the Sacramento NWS office called it "a significant red-flag event and one of the stronger ones of the season". PG&E informed 70,000 customers, residents of Paradise among them, that the utility company was considering shutting off their power to lessen the fire risk from downed power lines. PG&E eventually decided that conditions did not warrant it. The planned outage would not have prevented the Camp Fire's ignition, as the company did not de-energize transmission lines.

The downslope winds that formed on November 8 were particularly intense through Jarbo Gap, an area where air squeezes through the Feather River Canyon from the northeast. These "Jarbo Gap winds" commonly developed in the autumn, and in the fifteen years prior to the Camp Fire, records showed 35 days with wind gusts higher than 100 miles per hour (160 km/h).

Gusty winds at Jarbo Gap began at about 7:00 p.m. on November 7 and increased over the next two hours. By 4:00 a.m. on November 8, a remote automated weather station east of Paradise was recording sustained 32-mile-per-hour (51 km/h) winds and 52-mile-per-hour (84 km/h) gusts. By the time of the Camp Fire's ignition, the Jarbo Gap weather station was recording 18-mile-per-hour (29 km/h) winds out of the northeast with 40-mile-per-hour (64 km/h) gusts. The relative humidity level was 23 percent.

== Ignition ==
The Camp Fire was caused by the failure of a single metal hook attached to a PG&E transmission tower on the company's Caribou-Palermo transmission line, which carried power from hydroelectric facilities in the Sierra Nevada to the Bay Area. The tower, a little under 100 feet (30 m) tall, was built on a steep incline on a ridge above Highway 70 and the North Fork Feather River near the community of Pulga.

The tower had two arms, each with a hook hanging from a hole in a long piece of metal. The hook held up a string of electrical insulators. The transmission power lines were suspended by these insulators, away from the steel tower itself so as to prevent electricity arcing between them. One of the hooks on the tower (about three inches (7.6 cm) wide and one inch (2.5 cm) in diameter) had been worn down by rubbing against the metal plate that it hung from, to the point where only a few millimeters of metal remained.

At 6:15 a.m. PST on November 8, a PG&E control center in Vacaville recorded an outage on the company's transmission line in the Feather River Canyon. The hook—which was about 7/8ths worn through—had snapped under the weight of the power line and insulator string that it supported, which weighed more than 142 pounds (64 kg). No longer held up, the energized power line struck the transmission tower. This created an electric arc between the power line and the tower, which reached temperatures estimated at 5,000 to 10,000 °F (2,800 to 5,500 °C) and melted metal components of the conductor and the tower. The molten metal fell into the brush beneath the tower, setting it alight.

== Progression ==
=== November 8 ===
At about 6:20 a.m., a PG&E employee driving eastbound on Highway 70 in the Feather River Canyon spotted the fire and radioed his colleagues at Rock Creek Powerhouse; they called 911, who in turn transferred the call to the Cal Fire Emergency Communications Center (ECC) at 6:25 a.m. Additional calls to 911 followed, describing the fire as about 100 by 100 feet (30 by 30 m) in area, underneath the electrical transmission lines on the north side of the North Fork Feather River.

By 6:31 a.m., Cal Fire had notified firefighters at Fire Station 36 (located near Concow/Jarbo Gap) of the fire. By 6:35 a.m., two fire engines had left the station and were en route via Highway 70. They stopped above Poe Dam, on the opposite side of the Feather River, to survey the fire. At 6:44 a.m., the fire captain made an initial report to the Cal Fire ECC, describing the fire's inaccessibility and prospective growth.

We have eyes on the vegetation fire. It's going to be very difficult access; Camp Creek Road is nearly inaccessible. It is on the west side of the river underneath the transmission lines. It's got about a 35 miles per hour [56 km/h] sustained wind on it. We'll keep working on access. I'm going to go up the highway to try and get a better idea about how to get to it. It's a possibility we may have to come in off the top of Concow Road; Flea Mountain… This has got potential for a major incident. Request 15 additional engines, 4 additional dozers, 2 water tenders, 4 strike teams of hand crews. I'll get back to you on a reporting location.

— Capt. Matt McKenzie, initial report to Cal Fire Emergency Communications Center after arriving on scene at 6:44 a.m.^{,}

The fire was named after Camp Creek Road, near its place of origin. The road was unpaved and poorly maintained; it had taken one of McKenzie's engines an hour to travel one mile (1.6 km) along it during a previous fire. McKenzie requested that Cal Fire activate its aircraft earlier than their scheduled 8:00 a.m. flight time, and requested more personnel to try and stop the fire at Concow Road. At the same time, one fire engine was dispatched to Pulga and began door-to-door evacuations. By 6:51 a.m., the Camp Fire had burned about ten acres (4 ha). The fire crested the ridge above the Feather River Canyon "shortly after" 7:00 a.m., and about ten minutes later, it had burned 200–300 acres (80–120 ha) and was spreading rapidly towards the community of Concow.

==== Fire impacts Concow ====
Incident command requested that an evacuation warning be issued for Concow at 7:22 a.m. Buildings in the town began to burn by 7:25 a.m, and five minutes later Concow residents began calling 911 to report fire in their yards. An evacuation order was requested for Concow at 7:37 a.m. When the main fire front impacted Concow it was between one-half and one mile (0.8 and 1.6 km) across. "Intense fire was widespread" throughout the town by 8:00 a.m., according to a federal report.

==== Fire impacts Paradise ====
At 7:44 a.m., spot fires began to ignite in Paradise itself, ahead of the approaching main fire front. Simultaneously, the first Cal Fire air tanker left the ground at 7:44 a.m., quickly followed by an observation plane. The pilot quickly discovered that the winds were so strong—more than 50 miles per hour (80 km/h)—and the air so turbulent that fire retardant drops were impossible. The air tanker returned to base 45 minutes later, still fully loaded. Cal Fire made two more attempts to send air tankers, both of which were unsuccessful. While helicopters—better able to fly beneath the thick smoke—were able to drop water on evacuation routes over the course of the day, fixed-wing aircraft were grounded until the winds slowed.

By 7:48 a.m., people began calling 911 to report widespread spot fires on the eastern side of Paradise, 7.5 miles (12 km) from the Camp Fire's origin above the Poe Dam. At least 30 spot fires ignited within Paradise over the following 40 minutes.

Until around this point, the three on-duty 911 dispatchers in Paradise had been unaware of any evacuation orders or direct threat to Paradise from the fire. Dozens of people reported ash and smoke between 7:10 a.m. and 7:40 a.m., and all were told that the fire was north of Concow near Highway 70. At 7:50 a.m., a caller reporting "spot fires all over" was told that there were "no evacuations at this point." Nevertheless, the dispatchers began telling those callers from the far northeastern corner of Paradise to evacuate. The dispatchers learned of the Butte County Fire Department's orders to evacuate the entire town shortly after 8:00 a.m. and then began instructing all callers that they were under a mandatory evacuation, and should collect their belongings and leave. By 8:20 a.m., the Paradise 911 dispatch center had received 132 calls about the fire and, overwhelmed by the sheer quantity, began forwarding them to the dispatch center in Chico.

The main fire front reached Paradise at 8:30 a.m. between Apple View Way and Merrill Road. At this point it was approximately 0.6 miles (1 km) across, and shortly thereafter grew to two miles (2.8 km) wide as it grew to the south.

==== Remainder of the day ====
By 10:45 a.m., the fire had burned approximately 20,000 acres (8,100 ha). At some point that day, emergency shelters were established. Wind speeds approached 50 miles per hour (22 m/s), allowing the fire to grow rapidly. Most residents of Concow and many residents of Paradise were unable to evacuate before the fire arrived. Due to the speed of the fire, firefighters for the most part never attempted to prevent the flames from entering Concow or Paradise, and instead sought to help people get out alive. According to Chief Scott McLean of Cal Fire, "Pretty much the community of Paradise is destroyed, it's that kind of devastation. The wind that was predicted came and just wiped it out."

The first hours saw a cascade of failures in the emergency alert system, rooted in its patchwork, opt-in nature, and compounded by a loss of 17 cell towers. Only two dispatchers were on duty to field thousands of calls to 911. Emergency alerts suffered human error as city officials failed to include four at-risk areas of the city in evacuation orders and technical error as emergency alerts failed to reach 94 percent of residents in some areas and even in areas with the highest success still failed to reach 25 percent of those residents signed up.

At about 1:00 p.m., the wind slackened enough to allow fixed-wing air tankers to operate effectively. Nine air tankers operated for the next four-and-a-half hours: five S-2s, a DC-10, and three other large air tankers. They collectively dropped more than 69,000 US gallons (260 m^{3}) of fire retardant on November 8 alone. Fixed-wing air tankers ceased flying at 5:30 p.m. By 6:00 p.m., the fire had spread about 17 miles and burned nearly 55,000 acres (22,000 ha).

=== November 9–25 ===
The day after the fire started, PG&E employees noted the Big Bend's line equipment on the ground. On November 10, an estimate placed the number of structures destroyed at 6,713, which surpassed the Tubbs Fire as the most destructive wildfire in California history. By November 15, 5,596 firefighters, 622 engines, 75 water tenders, 101 handcrews, 103 bulldozers, and 24 helicopters from all over the Western United States were deployed to fight the fire.

NASA satellite images show the Camp Fire producing copious amounts smoke between November 7 and November 12, 2018

In the first week, the fire burned tens of thousands of acres per day. Containment on the western half was achieved when the fire reached primary highway and roadway arteries that formed barriers. In the second week the fire expanded by several thousand acres per day along a large, uncontained, and active fire line. Each day, containment increased by five percent along the uncontained eastern half of the fire that expanded into open timber and high country.

- November 9, the fire burned 70,000 acres (28,000 ha).
- November 10, the fire was 100,000 acres (40,000 ha) and 20 percent contained.
- November 13, the fire was 125,000 acres (51,000 ha) and 30 percent contained.
- November 14, PG&E employees noted a broken C hook and a disconnected insulation anchor on a nearby tower.
- November 15, the fire was 140,000 acres and 40 percent contained.
- November 16, the fire was 146,000 acres and 50 percent contained.
- November 17, the fire was 149,000 acres and 55 percent contained.
- November 21, 85 percent containment; with rain falling, fire activity from November 21-on described as minimal.
- November 22, 90 percent containment.

Heavy rainfall started on November 21, which helped contain the fire. Fire crews pulled back and let the rain put out the remaining fires while teams searched for victims.

The Camp Fire was declared 100 percent contained on Sunday, November 25, having burned for 17 days. This was five days ahead of the original projection for full containment on November 30, as firefighters had been aided by the recent rain. Over a thousand firefighters remained to search for any smoldering fires near the contained perimeter, clear roadways of debris and hazardous burned trees, and help with search and recovery efforts.

== Cause ==
The California Department of Forestry and Fire Protection and state utility regulators investigated Pacific Gas and Electric Company (PG&E) to determine if they complied with state laws in the areas burned in the fire. The Associated Press noted the fire started near a property where PG&E detected sparks on the day before its outbreak. PG&E was convicted of a felony due to a gas pipeline explosion in 2010 and is on probation. PG&E also reported damage to the Caribou-Palermo transmission line 15 minutes before flames were first reported under the wires; the same line was previously damaged in a windstorm in December 2012.

Investigators believed that the failure of a badly maintained steel hook holding up a high voltage line was a key cause of the fire. A PG&E report to CPUC on December 11, 2018, said that "it had found a hook designed to hold up power lines on the tower was broken before the fire, and that the pieces showed wear." A distribution line in Concow malfunctioned a half hour later, which was considered as a possible second ignition source. On November 11, PG&E employees saw bullets and bullet holes on pole equipment from the Big Bend distribution line affected by that outage, and downed wires, damaged poles and fallen trees about two thirds of a mile away.

Following the fire, multiple fire victims sued PG&E and its parent company in San Francisco County Superior Court before a definite cause had been determined, accusing PG&E of failure to properly maintain its infrastructure and equipment. In mid-May 2019, California state investigators announced that PG&E was responsible for the fire. The Cal Fire report was sent to the Butte County District Attorney Mike Ramsey. The hook that failed, ultimately causing the Camp Fire, was given by the Butte County District Attorney's office to the Golden Nugget Museum in Paradise for its exhibit on the fire.

== Effects ==
In context, the Camp Fire destroyed more structures than any wildfire in modern California history.

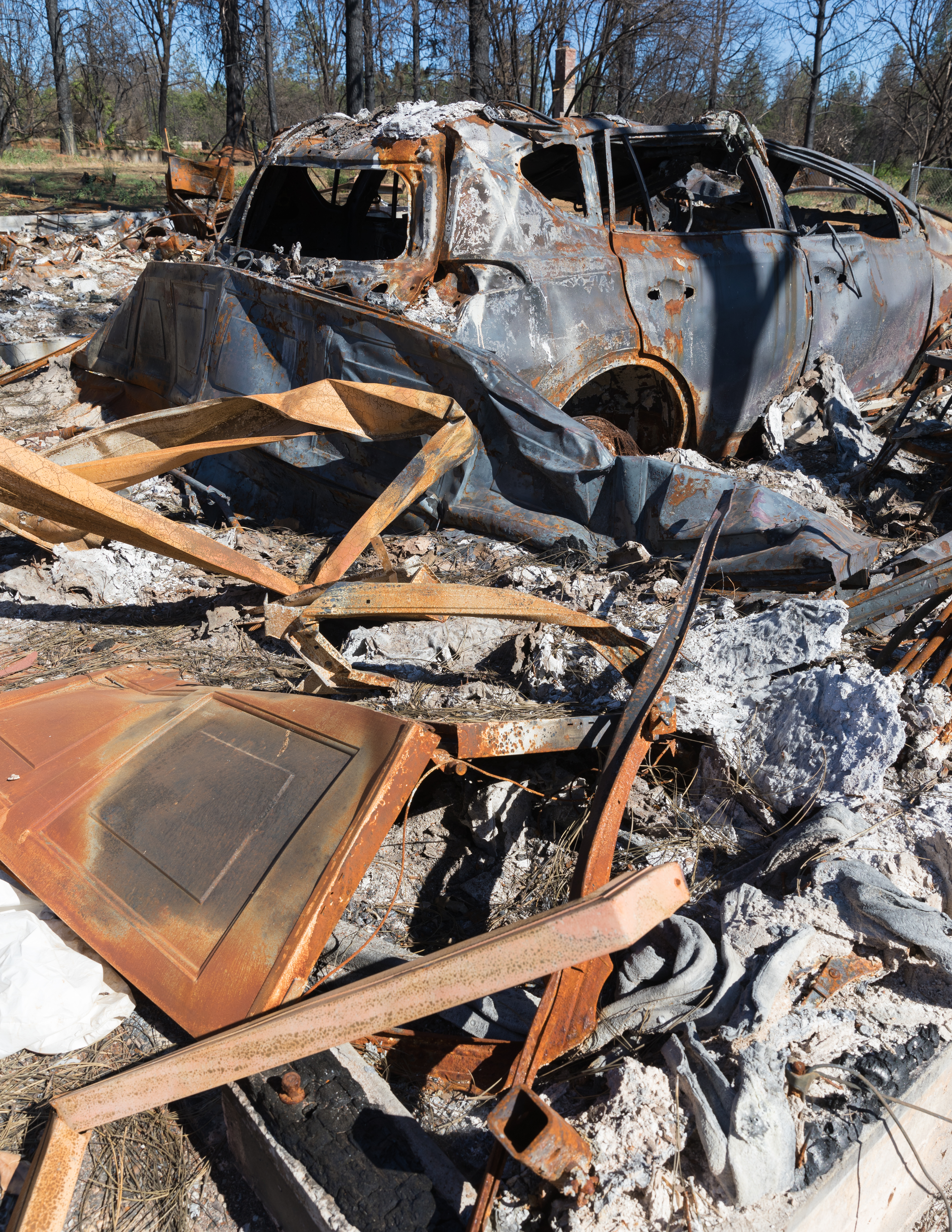
Aftermath on July 11, 2019

=== Casualties ===
There were a large number of fatalities in the first several hours of the fire, but they were not found quickly. Discovery of these early fatalities took place over the course of the following two weeks. In the first week, nearly ten victims per day were found. In the second week, that lowered to several victims per day. Victims were still being found in the third week and beyond.

- November 10, fourteen bodies were discovered, bringing casualties to 23.
- November 11, casualties increased to 29 after another six bodies discovered.
- November 13, casualties increased to 48, making it the single-deadliest wildfire in California history, surpassing the 1933 Griffith Park Fire, which killed 29 people.
- November 14, casualties increased from 48 to 56.
- November 16, casualties increased from 63 to 71.
- November 17, An additional five deaths brought the total to 76. President Donald Trump, Governor Jerry Brown, Governor-elect Gavin Newsom, and Federal Emergency Management Agency (FEMA) director Brock Long toured the Paradise area, and they held a short conference in the afternoon.
- November 18, casualties raised to 77.
- November 19, casualties raised to 79.
- November 20, casualties raised to 81.
- November 21, casualties raised to 83.
- November 23, casualties raised to 87.
- December 3, casualties revised to 85 after human remains in three separate bags were identified to be the same victim.

Identification of the deceased was hampered by the fragmentary condition of many bodies. Ten of 18 dentists in Paradise lost their offices and patient records in the fire. Two of the dead were identified from the serial numbers on artificial joints, 15 from dental records, five from fingerprints and 50 from DNA. Funerals and benefits were delayed by the identification difficulties. As of 2022, a few victims were still unidentified and undergoing testing and identification by the DNA Doe Project.

Traffic jams on the few evacuation routes led to cars being abandoned while people evacuated on foot, but did not contribute to any deaths. At least seven deaths occurred when the fire overtook people who were trapped in their vehicles, most on Edgewood Road, as well as one person outside a vehicle and two on ATVs. Some residents who were unable to evacuate survived by sheltering in place at the American gas station and the Nearly New antique store across the street. Others gathered in the nearby parking lot shared by a KMart and a Save Mart. The survival of some of those who sheltered in place has raised the question of whether in some scenarios last-minute mass evacuations provide the best outcomes, with some pointing to Australia's policy discouraging them, instituted following the 1983 Ash Wednesday brushfires in which many of the 75 dead were killed while trying to evacuate. However, 70 of the 84 fatalities listed in the Butte County District Attorney's Camp Fire investigation summary occurred inside or immediately outside the victim's residences, indicating that failure to evacuate contributed to many more deaths (70) than occurred while evacuating (8).

Many seniors were evacuated by passersby and neighbors, with at least one account of dozens of evacuees jumping into a reservoir to escape the flames. The Butte County Sheriff's Department initially reported a partial death count for each community (total 67): 50 in Paradise, seven in Concow, nine in Magalia, and one in Chico.

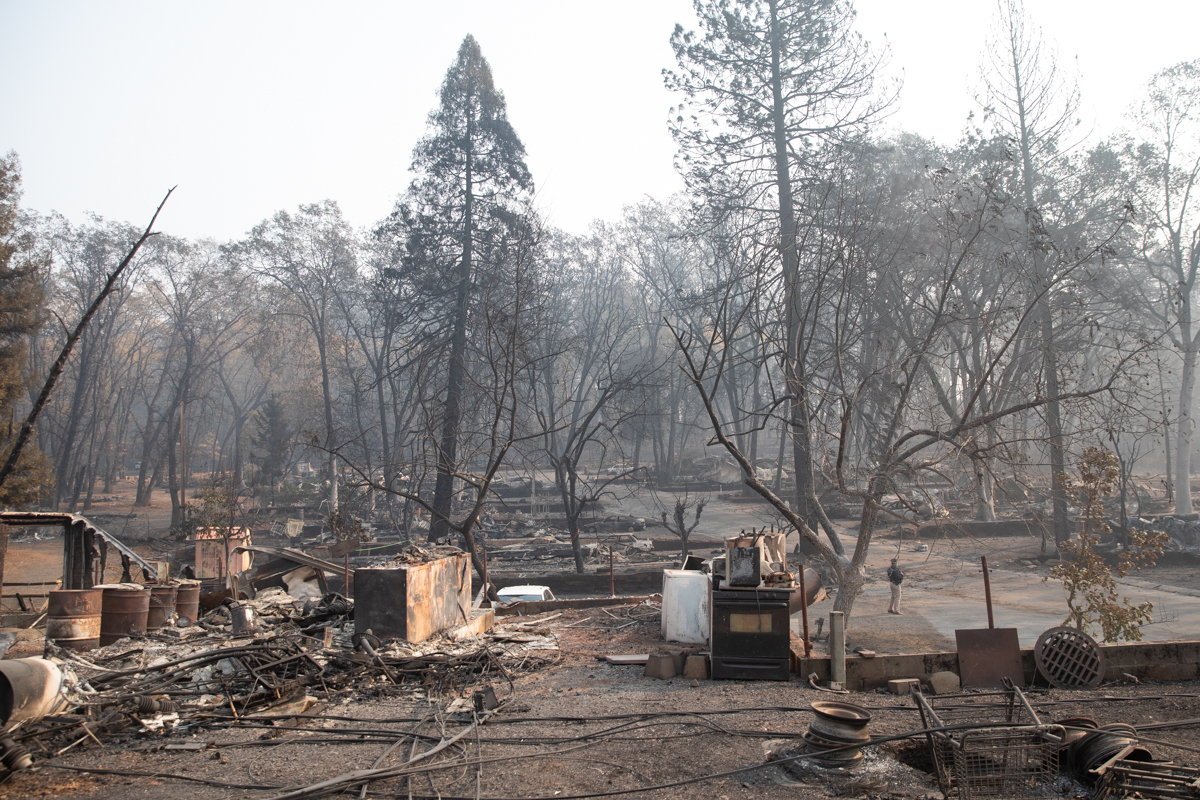
The Camp Fire destroyed at least 12,000 buildings

Five firefighters were injured during two separate incidents in the first two days of the Camp Fire. In the first, one fire captain and two prison inmate firefighters were seriously burned on their upper bodies on November 8 when shifting winds trapped them on a dirt road surrounded by barbed wire as the fire encroached. In the second, a fire captain and a firefighter received face and neck burns on November 9 when a propane tank exploded as they were defending a house from the fire.

Summary of impact on population and first responders reported by Cal Fire.

Missing, Injured, Fatalities, and Evacuated
Occupation	Missing	Injured	Fatalities	Evacuated
Civilian	1	12	85	52,000
Firefighter	0	5	0	N/A
Total	1	17	85	52,000

=== Damage and displacement ===
The fire forced the evacuation of Paradise, Magalia, Centerville, Concow, Pulga, Butte Creek Canyon, Berry Creek and Yankee Hill and threatened the communities of Butte Valley, Chico, Forest Ranch, Helltown, Inskip, Oroville, and Stirling City.

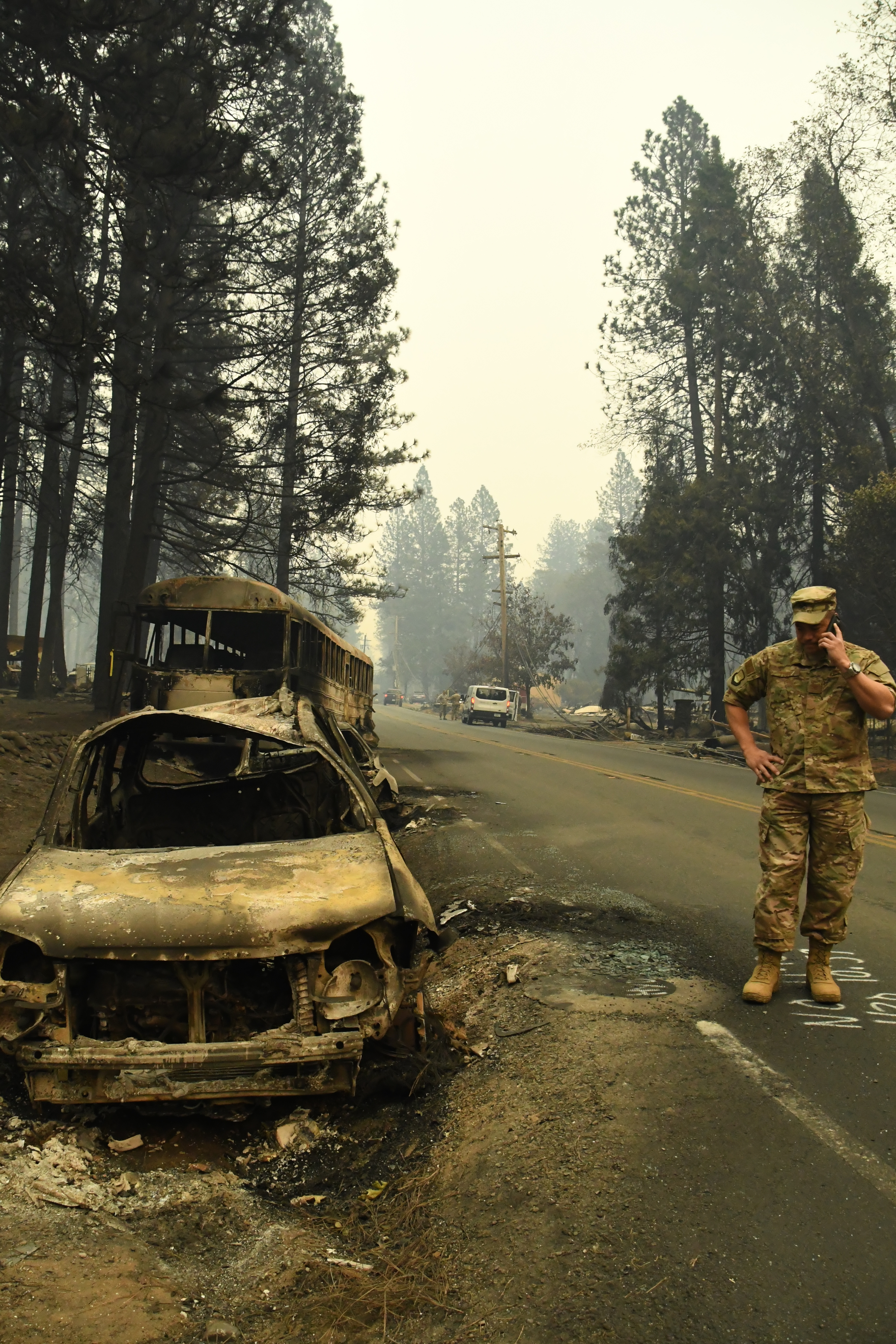
Burnt out vehicles abandoned along the evacuation route

The community of Concow and the town of Paradise were destroyed within the first six hours of the fire, losing an estimated 95 percent of their buildings. The town of Magalia also suffered substantial damage, and the community of Pulga, California suffered some. Nearly 19,000 buildings were destroyed, most of them homes, along with five public schools in Paradise, a rest home, churches, part of Feather River hospital, a Christmas tree farm, a large shopping center anchored by a Safeway, several fast food chains, such as Black Bear Diner and McDonald's, and numerous small businesses as well. The Honey Run Covered Bridge over nearby Butte Creek, the last three-span Pratt-style truss bridge in the United States, was incinerated on November 10.

Housing recovery in fire-impacted areas typically focuses on home owners and overlooks the needs of disadvantaged groups. After the fire, FEMA invited residents to purchase the mobile homes they were provided after the disaster. However, relocating mobile homes in high fire-risk areas was not permitted, and any mobile homes that did not meet the California fire code were mandated to be removed.

In May 2019, NPR reported that more than 1,000 families who were displaced by the fire were still looking for housing six months later. Rural northern California had been experiencing a severe housing shortage and growing homelessness crisis, compounded in part due to the fire. Prior to the fire, Chico had a housing vacancy rate of less than three percent. The loss of several thousand residences placed additional strain on Butte County's housing market. Average list prices for homes were reported to have increased by more than 10 percent.

Summary of structural damage reported by Cal Fire:

Estimates of Damaged and Destroyed Structures
Structure Type	Damaged	Destroyed	Total by Type
Single Family Residential	~465	~9,879	10,344
Multiple Family Residential*	~22	~276	298
Mobile home Residential*	~6	~3,695	3,701
Mixed Commercial/Residential*	~0	~11	11
Commercial	~105	~514	619
Other	~77	~4,286	4,363
Total	675	18,661	19,336

Note: Cal Fire damage updates do not contain categories tagged with *, however, a count was given November 17; also, '~' denotes an estimate.

=== Environmental impacts ===
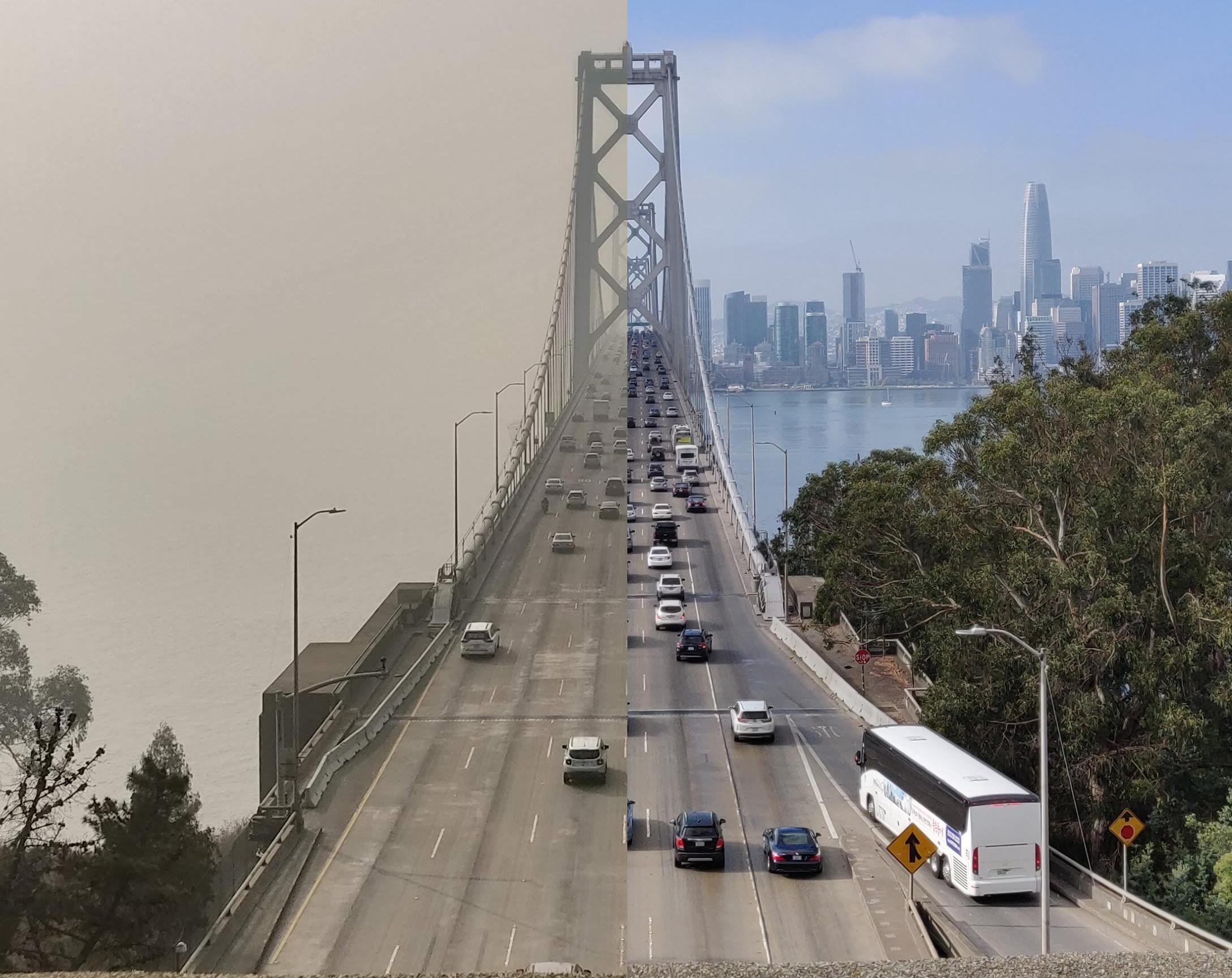
The Bay Bridge in San Francisco, California. The photo on the right was taken the month preceding the Camp Fire on October 14, 2018, and the one on the left on November 16, 2018.

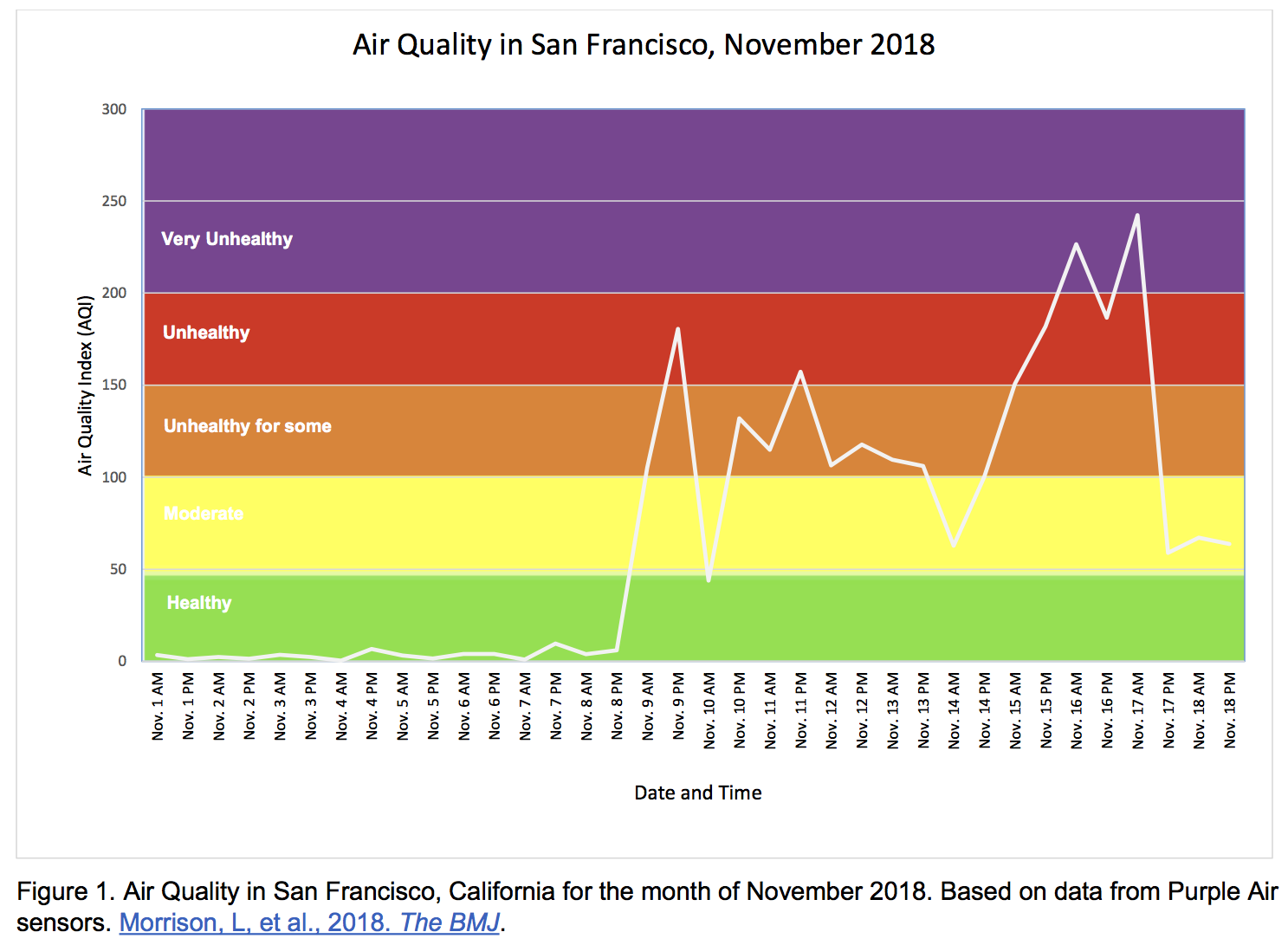
Bay Area air quality suffered, and for an unprecedented two days exceeded an air quality index of 200.

Smoke from the Camp Fire led to widespread air pollution throughout the San Francisco Bay Area and Central Valley, prompting the closure of public schools in five Bay Area counties and dozens of districts in the Sacramento metropolitan area on November 16. Haze from smoke in the upper atmosphere was observed in New York City, more than 3,000 miles (4,800 km) away. John Balmes, a physician at the University of California, Berkeley who sits on the California Air Resources Board, noted that the fire "[resulted in] the worst air pollution [ever] for the Bay Area and northern California."

Recovery efforts were slowed as crews tested burned debris for environmental contaminants such as asbestos, volatile organic compounds, heavy metals, arsenic, dioxins, and other hazardous materials that may have burned or spread in the fire.

The Butte County health officer issued an advisory suggesting against the re-habitation of destroyed properties, warning of the potential for exposure to hazardous materials. In the weeks following the fire, Paradise City Council and Butte County Supervisors passed emergency ordinances to alleviate the delay in FEMA temporary housing by allowing residents to return to their land and live in temporary residences until the cleanup was completed and they could rebuild. However, with additional information it was clear there was a significant risk to public health and in early February 2019, FEMA's Federal Coordinating Officer David Samaniego forced policymakers to retract the accommodation and remove residents from the burn area. Those policymakers released an announcement: "The Town of Paradise and Butte County were informed that emergency ordinances intended to provide a process for citizens to return to their properties prior to removal of the debris may impact federal funding. The disaster assistance is predicated on the need to remedy health and safety hazards that pose an immediate risk to citizens prior to living in recreational vehicles on their properties with structures burned during the Camp Fire." Emotions were summed up by resident Ben Walker while addressing the Paradise City Council: "I'm asking you not to throw the people of this town into the cold in the middle of winter. If the option is to choose federal money to rebuild the town, or the people to rebuild the town—choose the people".

Multiple drinking water systems across the burn area were chemically contaminated, and contaminated building plumbing. Benzene levels found in some drinking water samples, from multiple systems, exceeded hazardous waste levels. Other contaminants such as methylene chloride, vinyl chloride monomer, naphthalene, and others were also found above allowable drinking water exposure limits. In particular, methylene chloride was present above safe drinking water limits when benzene was not detected indicating benzene was not a predictor of wildfire contaminated water. Sources of this contamination are thought to include smoke being sucked into depressurized buried and building water system components and the thermal degradation of plastics in the water systems themselves. Investigators found that traditional methods of calculating burn severity using satellite imagery were not appropriate for classifying localized burn severity within WUI communities. Density of structural loss was more predictive of water system contamination. Studies revealed significant hardship by households across the burn area who had standing homes lacking safe water. Household drinking water and plumbing education efforts were conducted by Purdue University, University of California Berkeley, Butte College, and Chico State University researchers in collaboration with the Camp Fire Zone Project. In 2020, the U.S. National Academies convened a workshop to address questions related to post-wildfire public health challenges.

=== Economic impacts ===
The volume of insurance claims overwhelmed Merced Property and Casualty Company, a small insurer founded in 1906, to the point of insolvency (policyholders' surplus $25 million). In response to a notice given by the company, the California Department of Insurance reviewed and then placed it into liquidation. This allowed the California Insurance Guarantee Association, a state guaranty association, to cover claims. The Department of Insurance continued with a review of all insurers with a domicile in California as to determine the exposure of each to Camp Fire losses. An estimate by the Los Angeles Times of Merced Property and Casualty Company's assets and reinsurance showed that they would only be able to cover 150 homes out of the 14,000 homes destroyed in a region where they were one of the only companies that still provided fire insurance policies despite the region being categorized as a high fire-hazard severity zone by the California Department of Forestry and Fire Protection. This is the only known instance of an insurance company becoming insolvent from a single event.

On November 16, the Chico city council passed an emergency ordinance to prohibit price gouging in Chico, by preventing the cost of rent, goods or services from being increased by more than 10 percent for six months. The Camp Fire was the most expensive natural disaster in the world in 2018 in terms of insured losses. The firm Munich Re estimated that the fire caused $12.5 billion in covered losses and $16 billion in total losses.

=== PG&E bankruptcy ===
Facing potential liabilities of $30 billion from the wildfire, the electrical utility that was responsible for the transmission line suspected of sparking the wildfire, Pacific Gas and Electric (PG&E), on January 14, 2019, began the process of filing for bankruptcy with a 15-day notice of intention to file for bankruptcy protection. On January 29, 2019, PG&E Corporation, the parent corporation of PG&E, filed for bankruptcy protection. Because fire survivors are unsecured creditors with the same priority as bondholders, they are only paid in proportion to their claim size if anything is left after secured and priority claims are paid; it nearly ensures that they are not paid in full. PG&E had a deadline of June 30, 2020 to exit bankruptcy in order to participate in the California state wildfire insurance fund established by AB 1054 that helps utilities pay for future wildfire claims.

PG&E settled for $1 billion with state and local governments in June, 2019, and settled for $11 billion with insurance carriers and hedge funds in September, 2019. Claims for wildfire victims consist of wrongful death, personal injuries, property loss, business losses, and other legal damages. Representatives for wildfire victims said PG&E owed $54 billion or more, and PG&E was offering $8.4 billion for fire damages, Cal Fire, and FEMA. FEMA originally requested PG&E for $3.9 billion from the wildfire victims fund, threatening to take the money from individual wildfire victims if PG&E did not pay, and Cal OES had an overlapping $2.3 billion request, but they later settled for $1 billion after all wildfire victims were paid.

On November 12, 2019, PG&E provided an additional $6.6 billion for the claims of wildfire victims and other claimants in its proposed reorganization plan, increasing the amount to $13.5 billion. In a filing with the Securities and Exchange Commission (SEC), this put the total amount for fire claims at $25.5 billion. This consisted of $11 billion to insurance companies and investment funds, $1 billion to state and local governments, and $13.5 billion for other claims.

On December 6, 2019, PG&E proposed to settle the wildfire victim claims for a total of $13.5 billion, which would cover liability for its responsibility originating from the Camp Fire, Tubbs Fire, Butte Fire, Ghost Ship warehouse fire, and also a series of wildfires beginning on October 8, 2017, collectively called the 2017 North Bay Fires. The offer was tendered as part of PG&E's plan to exit bankruptcy. Wildfire victims got half of their $13.5 billion settlement as stock shares in the reorganized company, adding to the uncertainty as to when and how much they would be paid. On June 12, 2020, because of uncertainties in the value of the liquidated stock, and in part because of the financial market impact of the COVID-19 pandemic, PG&E agreed to increase the amount of stock.

On June 16, 2020, PG&E pleaded guilty to 84 counts of involuntary manslaughter for those that died in the Camp Fire, for which paid the maximum fine of $3.5 million and end all further criminal charges against PG&E. This action did not alleviate PG&E of any future civil claims by victims of the Camp Fire which would fall outside the bankruptcy proceedings, as well as how existing litigation against PG&E may be handled. On June 20, 2020, U.S. Bankruptcy Judge Dennis Montali issued the final approval of the plan for the reorganized PG&E to exit bankruptcy, meeting the June 30, 2020 deadline for PG&E to qualify for the California state wildfire insurance fund for utilities.

=== Fire Victim Trust ===
On July 1, 2020, the PG&E Fire Victim Trust (FVT) was established as part of the reorganization plan of the 2019 bankruptcy of PG&E to administer the claims of the wildfire victims. Also on July 1, PG&E funded the FVT with $5.4 billion in cash and 22.19 percent of stock in the reorganized PG&E, which covered most of the obligations of its settlement for the wildfire victims. PG&E had two more payments totaling $1.35 billion in cash that were paid in January 2021 and January 2022 to complete its obligations to the wildfire victims. For additional funding, on January 28, 2021, the FVT sued multiple PG&E contractors responsible for tree trimming, infrastructure inspections and maintenance for breach of contract and neglect, and on February 24, 2021, sued 22 former PG&E officers and directors for breach of fiduciary duty by failing to put in place policies and practices to respond to deficient tree trimming work and aging infrastructure. On September 29, 2022, the FVT announced that they had settled the lawsuit against PG&E's former officers and directors for $117 million.

Initially, the Trustee, the Honorable John K. Trotter (Ret.), and the Claims Administrator, Cathy Yanni, were in charge of the FVT. On July 1, 2022, Cathy Yanni became Trustee of the FVT, replacing Justice John Trotter. Claimants are wildfire victims from the 2015 Butte Fire, 2017 North Bay Fires, and 2018 Camp Fire in Northern California. The 2017 Tubbs Fire is considered to be one of the 2017 North Bay Fires. Victims of the 2019 Kincade Fire were not covered by the FVT. Victims of the 2016 Ghost Ship warehouse fire were also not covered by the FVT, but by PG&E's insurance coverage for the year 2016.

Claims for wildfire victims include real estate and personal property, personal income loss, business loss, wrongful death, personal injury, emotional distress, zone of danger, and nuisance claims. Victims were paid in cash, funded partly from the cash portion of the settlement, and partly from 478 million shares of PG&E stock that will be liquidated into cash on a schedule and at a price that was not determined as of 2020. Starting November 23, 2020, the FVT began issuing Preliminary Payments up to $25,000 for those with significant losses. There were 71,394 wildfire victims who filed claims by the deadline of February 26, 2021. Starting March 15, 2021, the FVT began issuing the first installment of Pro Rata Payments (partial payments) to eligible claimants. This first installment was 30 percent of the Approved Claim Amount for their damages, because the total amount of money available to the FVT was unknown. Starting February 15, 2022, the FVT began issuing payments with a Pro Rata of 45 percent, meaning that those that had already received a payment would get a supplemental payment, and payments made after February 15, 2022, would be at 45 percent. As of September 30, 2022, there were 244,292 distinct claims that had been filed, and the FVT had distributed $5.08 billion to 49,301 wildfire victims.

== Response ==
=== First responders ===
While successful in evacuating nearly the entire town of Paradise, first responders were limited by an insufficient number of cell phone repeaters, which resulted in communication difficulties and reduced Internet speed. The wildfire alert system was similarly hampered by damaged cell towers; 17 towers burned the first day. Many residents did not sign up for the warnings, some neighborhoods for unknown reasons did not receive any warnings, and the failure rate of the warnings that did get sent ranged from 25 to 94 percent. Randall L. Stephenson, AT&T CEO, committed to fixing this problem, as AT&T added mobile repeaters to improve coverage. Two weeks into the fire, 66 cell repeaters were still damaged or out of service, and the remaining cell infrastructure was overloaded.

Initial widespread confusion about reporting missing people limited the search for victims. The Butte County Sheriff's Office opened a call center, staffed daily from 8:00 a.m. to 8:00 p.m., to provide and receive information and inquiries on missing persons. The North Valley Animal Disaster Group worked with law enforcement and other shelters, rescue groups and independent operations to rescue and reunite pets and families, and established an animal shelter at the Chico Airport.

Fire resources were stretched as the fire began on the same day as the Woolsey Fire and the Hill Fire in Southern California. Camp Fire resource requests alone equalled the entire 6,000 Cal Fire full-time fire professionals. Both fires pulled resources from 17 states to respond. By the second day of the fire, only half the fire resources had assembled. The initial response within Paradise was shouldered by Paradise's three fire engines in stations 81, 82, and 83, and the two engines at Butte County Cal Fire Station 35. At the height of deployment, there were 5,596 firefighters (including 770 inmate firefighters), 622 engines, 75 water tenders, 101 fire crews, 103 bulldozers, 24 helicopters, and 12 fixed-wing aircraft.

On the morning of ignition, high winds limited fixed-wing air support. By that afternoon, calming winds allowed for nine fixed-wing aircraft on the fire, including five 1,200-gallon S-2 Trackers, three 3,000-gallon BAE 146s, and one 12,000-gallon DC-10 Air Tanker. Eventually, three additional aircraft were deployed from out of state, including two 1,620-gallon CL-415 Super Scoopers that arrived from their home in Washington on November 9 and a 19,600-gallon 747 Supertanker that arrived from its home in Colorado on November 11 after gaining a contract to work on federal land.

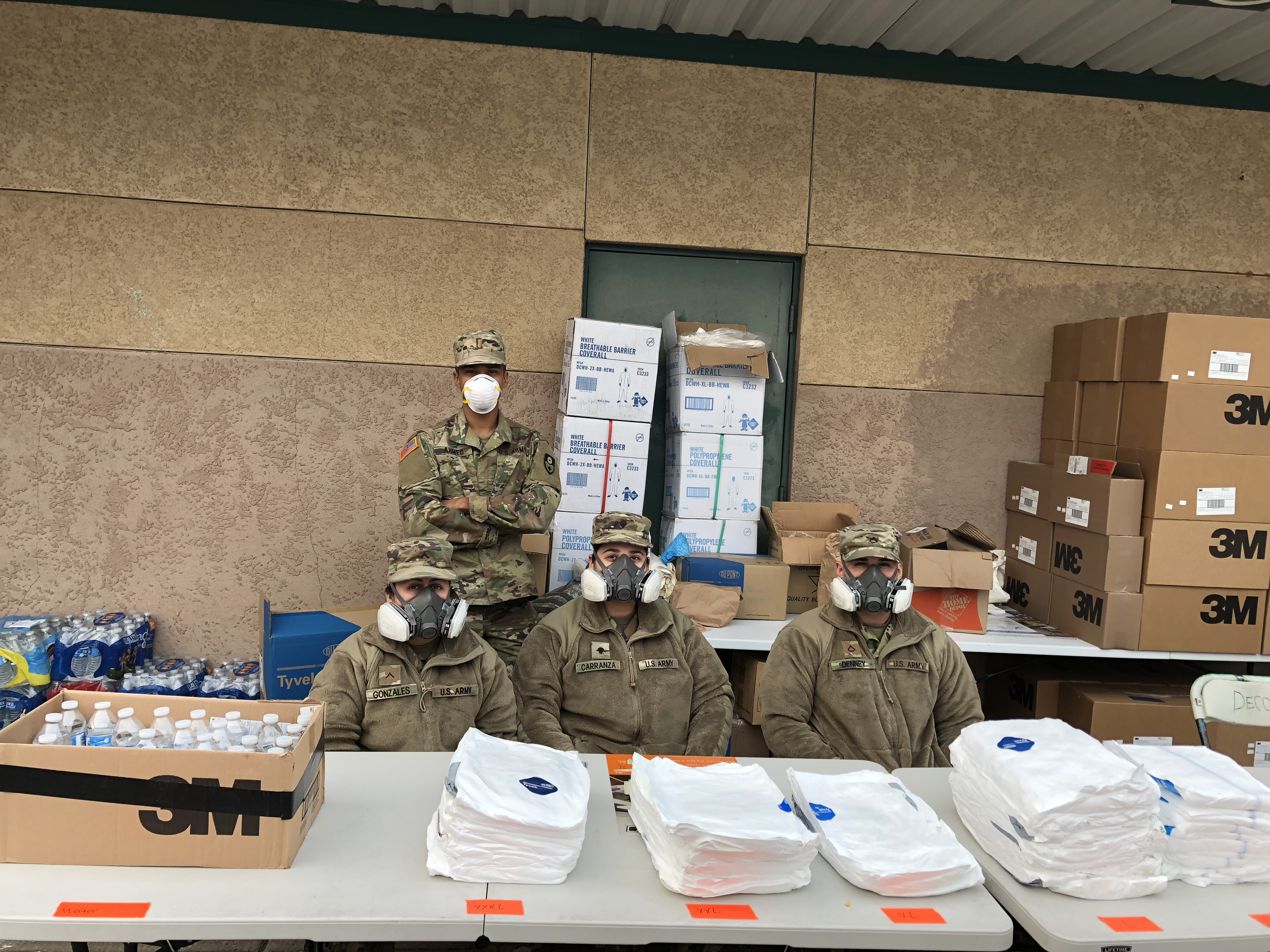
California National Guard soldiers from the 49th Brigade distributing supplies to search teams during the Camp Fire.

The California National Guard activated 700 soldiers to assist, including 100 military police officers from the 49th Brigade to provide security and search for remains with the assistance of 22 cadaver dogs. The 2632nd Transportation company provided haul trucks. The 140th Regiment provided air support. The 224th Sustainment Brigade constructed Alaska tents for temporary facilities.

A Black Hawk helicopter from California's 140th Aviation Regiment gathering water with a helicopter bucket during Camp Fire, November 14, 2018.

A Black Hawk helicopter from California's 140th Aviation Regiment gathering water with a helicopter bucket in the Feather River Canyon located on the northeast corner of the Camp Fire; Friday, November 16, 2018.

=== Evacuation centers ===
From November 8 to December 1, an encampment formed in a vacant lot next to the Walmart store in nearby Chico. The camp was in addition to motel room vouchers from FEMA and ten shelters established by the Red Cross and churches to house evacuees. Over a hundred people had become ill with norovirus at the shelters due to poor hygiene in overcrowded centers—prompting many to camp outdoors. Volunteers from across the region came to the camp and provided services for food, shelter, and sanitation; fire refugees referred to their camp as "Wallywood". The camp population swelled to over a thousand people. Butte County has a persistent homeless population of 7,500 people; many reside in Chico, and some campers were identified as resident homeless people who did not live in the fire zone. On December 1, the firefighter camp facilities at the Butte County Fairgrounds became available, whereupon the Walmart camp was closed and the field fenced off, with the remaining fifty refugees relocated to the firefighters' camp.

=== Mental health support ===
Recovery efforts included supporting the mental health of Camp Fire victims, particularly the youth. Some former residents reported survivor guilt, troubling dreams, and symptoms of posttraumatic stress. To ease the stress on fire victims, several people brought therapy dogs from the Butte Humane Society's Animal Assisted Wellness program. Lise Van Susteren summarized the burden these children bear in experiencing climate change: "These kids are at the tip of the spear."

=== Environmental cleanup ===
The Camp Fire cleanup became the largest hazardous material cleanup in state history. Due to the time required to clean up a town of nearly 30,000 people and surrounding rural metro region of another 3,000 people, and the infeasible task of developing temporary housing, residents were allowed to take up residence on their burned-out lots, which possibly exposed them to hazardous materials. Winter rains began at the end of the Camp Fire and as a result, hazardous contaminants soaked into the ground and ran into waterways which raised concerns for the drinking water. Another concern was benzene contamination from burning plastic pipes. Paradise tested sections of their water supply and initially "22 out of 24 water systems were tested" and announced as passed. Later, the Paradise Irrigation District issued a notice that the water is contaminated and cannot be used. For water tributaries within the 244-square-mile burn, "a months-long water monitoring program [sampled] surface water at least seven times through spring 2019." While heavy metals and dioxins were concerns, a more pressing public health issue was an intestinal parasite, cryptosporidium, to which bare soil provided greater access to water systems.

FEMA, the Army Corps of Engineers, and the California Governor's Office of Emergency Services (CalOES) collaborated on developing a site to process fire zone demolition and remediation debris. Of fifty potential sites within thirty miles of Paradise, they identified the 200-acre Koppers Superfund Site in Oroville as a suitable site based on an industrial zoning and a rail spur; the site ultimately was dismissed due to concerns of toxicity. After consideration, all fifty sites were rejected and instead, hazardous waste, such as electronics, car batteries, and asbestos were hauled several hours by trucks directly from the individual cleanup sites to landfills in California and Nevada.

The government procurement for cleanup was broken into several contract packages and put out to public bid to remove, process, and dispose of five million tons of materials at a cost of $3 billion:

- ECC Constructors LLC, SF Bay Area, CA: Remove debris from half of Paradise ($359 million).
- SPSG Partners, a joint venture of Pacific States Environmental Contractors (in partnership with De Silva Gates Construction, Dublin, CA), Goodfellow Brothers Construction, and Sukut Construction, Santa Ana, CA: Remove debris from half of Paradise, CA ($378 million).
- CERES Environmental Services (aka Environmental & Demolition Services Group), Sarasota, FL: Remove debris from areas outside the town of Paradise ($263 million).
- Tetra Tech, Pasadena, CA: Test soils for contamination ($250 million). Parent company Tetra Tech EC faked soil tests in Bayview–Hunters Point, San Francisco; two company supervisors were sentenced to prison.
- Offhaul contracts went to several local sites, which avoided the need for rail offhaul to out of state sites:
  - Waste Management; Anderson, CA: Contaminated demolition, such as ash, debris, and soil.
  - Recology; Wheatland, CA: Contaminated demolition, such as ash, debris, and soil.
  - Odin Metal; Oroville, CA: Metals, such as burned vehicles and equipment.
  - Granite's Pacific Heights Recycling; Oroville, CA: Concretes, such as house foundations and driveways.
  - Franklin Recycling; Paradise, CA: Concretes, such as house foundations and driveways.
  - Concrete would be shipped out of the county by truck as needed.

The Paradise Fire Safe Council is looking at putting out bids for salvage logging the 443,000 dead trees, which would otherwise be the responsibility of homeowners at a combined cost of $750 million. There are challenges such as logging must be within a few months or the trees will begin to rot; these challenges were being tested through a pilot program.

=== Wildland and climate ===
The Los Angeles Times reported the Camp Fire burned across an area burned to bare dirt by a hot burning wildfire ten years earlier, then salvage logged; fire ecologist Chad Hanson suggested brush piles and young trees left over after the salvage logging provided fast-burning fuels aiding the fire's rapid spread. The Camp Fire was initially fueled by dry grass amid sparse pine and oak woodlands. This drove most of the post-event discussion away from timber management as a future fire-prevention solution.

The fire was largely driven by extreme weather conditions—high winds and low humidity—and spread through fuels parched by more than 200 days without significant precipitation, part of a statewide drought related to climate change.

The Sacramento Bee looked at whether residential development is appropriate in the Sierra Nevada wildland-urban zones, quoting a former Sacramento Metropolitan Fire District chief, "There's just some places a subdivision shouldn't be built." Issues include if development can be safe, and if safe, what building codes and emergency response infrastructure would be needed. That discussion pointed to other Sierra Foothill communities similar to Paradise. Cal Fire stated: "Those kinds of geographic features are present in many foothill towns." Those features include proximity and alignment to river canyons channeling wind-fed flames over foothill communities. Visiting Professor Moritz (UC Santa Barbara) said, "if we were to go back and do the wind mapping, we would find, at some intervals, these areas are prone to these north and northeasterly [strong hot autumn wind] events."

=== Political ===
On November 10, U.S. president Donald Trump misleadingly stated that "There is no reason for these massive, deadly and costly forest fires in California except that forest management is so poor", including the Camp Fire and the concurrent Woolsey Fire in Southern California. In a tweet, he threatened to end federal assistance unless "gross mismanagement of the forests" is remedied.

Trump elaborated on his claims in an interview with Chris Wallace and during his trip to Paradise, stating, "you got to take care of the floors. You know the floors of the forest — very important" and "[Finland] spent a lot of time on raking and cleaning and doing things and they don't have any problem." Finland's president Sauli Niinistö was baffled by Trump's assertions and denied they talked about raking, leading to an Internet phenomenon of Finnish people sharing photos of themselves sarcastically raking forests with items such as house brooms and vacuum cleaners. Some fire experts refuted Trump's claims, noting Californians were experiencing unusually dry conditions and abnormally high fire danger. Brian Rice, president of the California Professional Firefighters, described Trump's assertion about state forest management practices as "demeaning" and "dangerously wrong", noting that 60 percent of California forests are directly managed by federal agencies, primarily the United States Forest Service, which had reduced spending on forest management in recent years.

An ongoing discussion in California had revolved around the issue of increasing fire hazard due to a buildup of fuels. In 2016, prior to the Camp Fire, Governor Jerry Brown warned that this is "the new normal", yet in September 2016, despite unanimous legislative approval, California Governor Brown vetoed Senate Bill 1463, which aimed to reduce the risk of power lines sparking fires in brush-covered and wooded areas. The key provisions in SB1463 were requirements to define in R.15-05-006 what "Enhanced mitigation measures" means and to explain how concerns of regional fire agencies were incorporated into R.15-05-006. The Governor pointed out that the bill duplicated ongoing efforts by Cal-Fire and PG&E in fire mapping power lines with R.15-05-006. Subsequent to the veto, "on January 19, 2018 the CPUC adopted, via Safety and Enforcement Division's (SED) disposition of a Tier 1 Advice Letter, the final CPUC Fire-Threat Map." Following the Camp Fire, the CPUC moved on a new approach to fire prevention with a vote on December 15, 2018, to improve rules governing when utilities should disable power lines to reduce the risk of fires.

US District Court Judge William Alsup ruled on May 7, 2019 that the board of PG&E would be required to tour the fire area, at a hearing on the utility's violation of its criminal Federal probation for its negligence in causing the 2010 San Bruno natural gas pipeline failure and subsequent explosion. This violation of Federal probation predated the Camp Fire; after the 2017 Honey Fire, a much smaller fire that also took place in Butte County, investigators found that PG&E equipment started that fire. The company settled with prosecutors but did not properly report these events to its Federal probation officer.

==== Electrical infrastructure hardening ====
Going forward post-Camp Fire, policymakers are looking at options to harden the California energy distribution infrastructure against wildfires. A key constraint is that California is reliant on a system of centralized electrical generation with distribution to end-users. One proposal to prevent fires is underground distribution similar to modern suburban electrical distribution. In November 2018 and initiated prior to the Camp Fire, PG&E piloted in the North Bay a hardened section of electrical infrastructure.

While buried power lines will reduce the risk of sparking wildfires, however, that solution increases distribution infrastructure cost by 10 times. A suggestion to reduce cost is to harden the sections of high energy lines through high wind areas upwind of residential communities in the wildland–urban interface, in particular, around river canyons pointing to those residential areas. The State Legislature has made efforts towards this strategy, however, while PG&E piloted a segment of hardened infrastructure, PG&E also diverted half the funds intended by the Legislature for this purpose. Hardening utilities with underground placement is common, such as gas and fiber-optic, which are usually buried. Of 175,000 miles of Californian electrical infrastructure, 80,000 miles is fire-prone.

=== Recovery ===
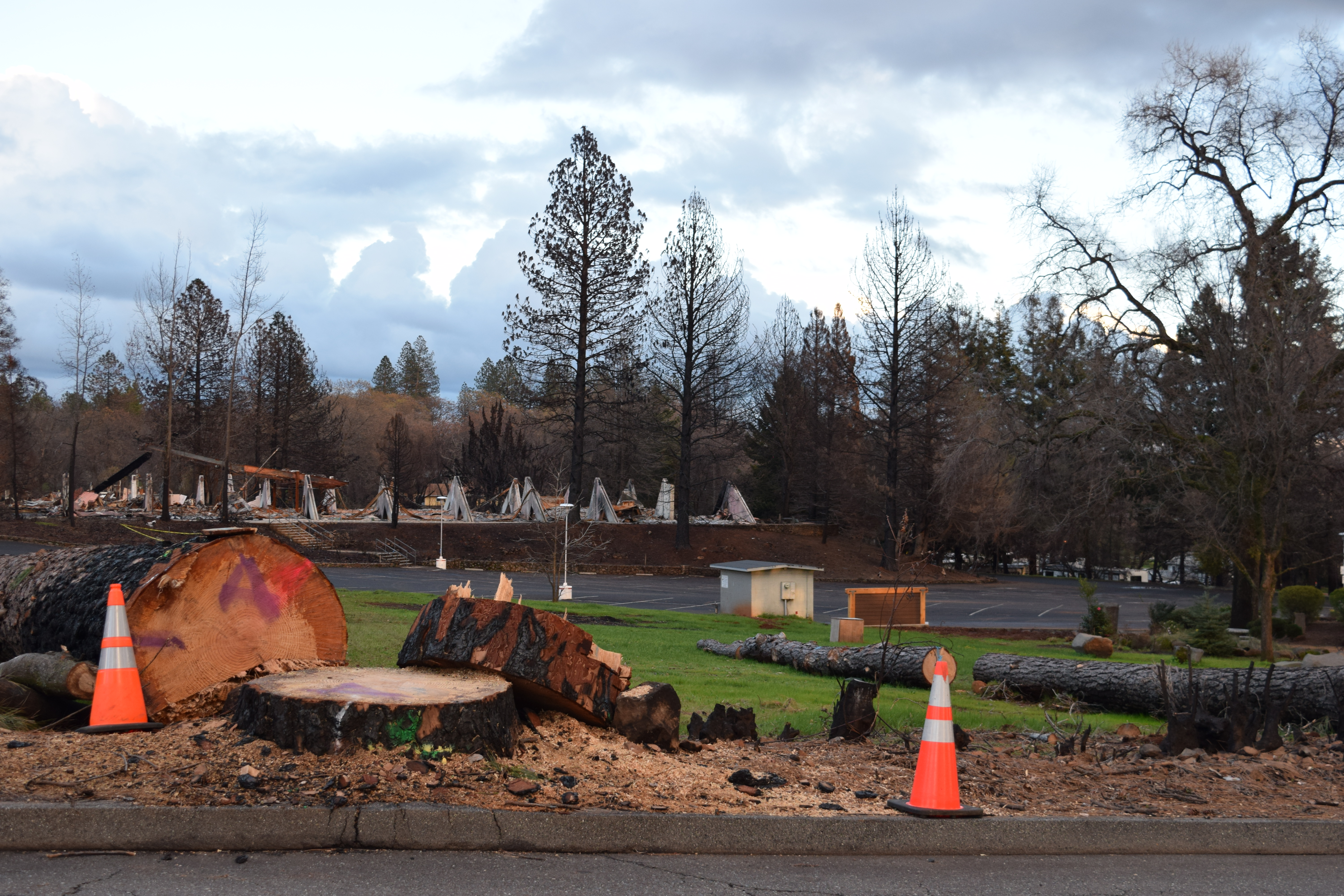
Burnt Seventh-day Adventist church, Paradise

The first two building permits were reissued for Paradise after almost five months on March 28, 2019. Local public policymakers wanted to promote rebuilding with higher standards for fire-resistant construction, upgraded infrastructure, and using the recommended 2009 redesigns for enhanced fire safety, which included expanded road capacity to increase evacuation capacity and to provide better access for emergency equipment. The first Certificate of Occupancy was granted in July 2019.

The Paradise Seventh-day Adventist church was completely destroyed, as was part of its adjacent academy. Estimates were that at least 600 homes of Adventist Health employees in Paradise had been destroyed. When power was restored to the site, the church began providing free potable water to neighbors. Other places of worship were also destroyed, including Our Savior Lutheran Church, Ridge Presbyterian Church, Paradise Church of Christ, First Assembly of God, Craig Memorial Congregational Church, Paradise Foursquare, New Life Apostolic Church, Paradise Pentecostal Church of God, and Community Church of the Brethren. A Church of Jesus Christ of Latter-Day Saints (LDS) meetinghouse and a Center for Spiritual Living were also destroyed.

A community interfaith memorial was held on February 8, 2019, at the Paradise Performing Arts Center. The event was their grand re-opening since the Camp Fire. Over a dozen faith traditions offered a free celebration of life for the lives lost in the Camp Fire. The event was broadcast by Action News Now, NBC attended by 800+ Butte County community members. The event, which promoted healing, unity, and a time for the community to reconnect was sponsored by the Chico Area Interfaith Council. Families received remembrance gifts, and there was prayer, two choirs, piano, and a tribute to each individual who lost their life. The memorial was hosted by Linda Watkins-Bennett and singer-songwriter Red Grammer performed his song "We're Made of Love", which was written for the memorial.

By late 2023, the population of Paradise was estimated at one third of its pre-fire levels. 2,464 homes had been rebuilt, which was roughly 32% of the number of homes that had been there pre-fire. An average of 600 new homes were being built each year. Paradise was the fastest growing city in California. Residents noted changes in the landscape, with the loss of tree cover improving visibiity of the night sky. A new high school was built, but businesses and commercial enterprises were slower to return to the town.

In an effort to improve fire safety an emergency siren system was installed, new powerlines were placed underground, and 70,000 dead and hazardous trees were removed. Despite these and other improvements, the town is still considered at high risk for fire. Many residents continue to suffer from PTSD and worsened breathing due to smoke inhalation.

== In popular culture ==
=== Books ===
- In 2021, The Washington Post staff writer Lizzie Johnson (formerly a reporter specializing in wildfire coverage at the San Francisco Chronicle) published the non-fiction book Paradise: One Town's Struggle to Survive an American Wildfire to critical acclaim. It won the Gold Medal for nonfiction at the 2022 California Book Awards. In 2025, a few chapters of Paradise were loosely adapted into the film The Lost Bus.
- In 2021, Los Angeles Times sports columnist Bill Plaschke published the non-fiction book Paradise Found: A High School Football Team’s Rise from the Ashes, documenting the ways in which the Paradise High School football team, the Paradise Bobcats, inspired the townspeople of Paradise as the town rebuilt after the Camp Fire.

=== Film and television ===
- In 2019, both Netflix and Frontline released separate documentaries, both called Fire in Paradise.
- In 2020, National Geographic released the documentary Rebuilding Paradise, directed by Ron Howard.
- In 2020, season 41 of This Old House featured a four-episode series about families rebuilding their homes after the fire.
- In 2021, BBC One released the documentary Greta Thunberg: A Year to Change the World, which featured a segment in which climate activist Greta Thunberg spoke with witnesses to the Camp Fire.
- In 2021, the documentary Bring Your Own Brigade, about both the Camp Fire and the Woolsey Fire (which were burning at the same time in November 2018), premiered at the Sundance Film Festival to positive reviews. It was produced and directed by Lucy Walker.
- In 2025, the film The Lost Bus, directed by Paul Greengrass, was released in theaters and on Apple TV. It is a fictionalized account of the Camp Fire based on a small section of Lizzie Johnson's non-fiction book Paradise, mainly following school bus driver Kevin McKay (Matthew McConaughey) and teacher Mary Ludwig (America Ferrera) as they attempt to rescue 22 children stranded by the fires. The film received mostly positive reviews for its effects and performances, and was nominated for an Academy Award for Best Visual Effects.

== See also ==
- 2018 California wildfires
- Woolsey Fire – A destructive wildfire that burned concurrently in Southern California
- Fire weather
- Lytton wildfire — A Canadian wildfire that burned 90% of Lytton, British Columbia in 2021
- List of fires
- Pacific Gas and Electric Company disasters
- Utility-caused wildfires
