= Burning Index =

The Burning Index (BI) is a number used by the National Oceanic and Atmospheric Administration (NOAA) to describe the potential amount of effort needed to contain a single fire in a particular fuel type within a rating area. The National Fire Danger Rating System (NFDRS) uses a modified version of Bryam's equation for flame length – based on the Spread Component (SC) and the available energy (ERC) – to calculate flame length from which the Burning Index is computed.

The equation for flame length is listed below:

$$F_L=j\left [\left(\frac{SC}{60}\right) (25(ERC))\right ]^{0.46}$$

where:

j is a scaling factor,
SC is the spread component,
and ERC is the Energy Release Component.

Consequently, the equation for the Burning Index is:

$$BI=j_1\ F_L$$

where $j_1$ is the Burning Index scaling factor of (10/ft). Therefore, dividing the Burning Index by 10 produces a reasonable estimate of the flame length at the head of a fire. A unique Burning Index (BI) table is required for each fuel model.
