= Spread Component =

Spread Component (SC) (as used in the National Fire Danger Rating System) is a rating of the forward rate of spread of a headfire. Deeming states that "the spread component is numerically equal to the theoretical ideal rate of spread expressed in feet-per-minute."

This carefully worded statement indicates both guidelines (theoretical) and cautions (ideal) that must be used when applying the spread component. Wind speed, slope, and fine fuel moisture are key inputs in the calculations of the spread component, thus accounting for a high variability from day to day. The spread component is expressed on an open-ended scale; it has no upper limit.
