= Ignition Component =

The Ignition Component (IC) is a number which relates the probability that a fire will result if a firebrand is introduced into a fine fuel complex. It is a component of the National Fire Danger Rating System (NFDRS).

== Meaning ==
The ignition component can range from 0 when conditions are cool and damp, to 100 on days when the weather is dry and windy. Theoretically, on a day when the ignition component value is 0 a single firebrand will not start a Wildland fire requiring suppression action. A value of 50, there is a 50% probability a single firebrand could start a wildfire requiring suppression action. And when the value is 100, there is a 100% probability a wildfire will result from a single firebrand that will require suppression action to stop the fire from spreading in wildland fuels. In relation to fire danger, IC of 100 means that every firebrand will cause an actionable fire if it contacts receptive fuel, extreme. Likewise, IC of 0 no firebrand would cause an actionable fire under those conditions, low fire danger.
