= Lizzie Johnson =

Reporter, war correspondent and author

- Born: Nebraska, United States
- Education: University of Missouri - Columbia (B.A. in Journalism and Political Science)
- Occupations: Journalist, author
- Notable work: Paradise: One Town's Struggle to Survive an American Wildfire (2021)
- Awards: National Press Club President's Award, 2022 California Book Awards Gold Medal (Nonfiction)

Lizzie Johnson is an American journalist and author known for her investigative, long-form reporting and work as a war correspondent. Her coverage has focused on climate-related disasters and wildfires and, most recently, on the war in Ukraine. She is the author of Paradise: One Town's Struggle to Survive an American Wildfire, an account of the disastrous Camp Fire that nearly destroyed the town of Paradise, California. The book was published in 2021; Apple Original Films adapted it into the movie The Lost Bus, released in 2025.

== Early life, education and work ==
Johnson was raised in Nebraska. She earned bachelor's degrees in journalism and political science from the University of Missouri. After graduation, Johnson worked at several newspapers including The Dallas Morning News, The Omaha World-Herald, The Chicago Tribune, and El Sol de San Telmo in Buenos Aires, Argentina.

== San Francisco Chronicle (2015-2021) ==
Johnson joined the San Francisco Chronicle in 2015, initially covering city hall and local San Francisco matters. In a Columbia Journalism Review profile of Johnson, she described questioning her future in journalism as spent a late night covering whether new "pee repellent" paint was working in a San Francisco Muni Station. Shortly after, Johnson covered the fires in Napa and Sonoma counties, an experience that felt more significant. "I loved talking with people and feeling like I was making a difference in their lives before the story even came out", Johnson told the CJR.

That year, Johnson began covering wildfires non-stop as the record-setting 2017 California wildfires continued. She eventually created her role as the paper's first full-time fire reporter. She went on to cover 15 of California's deadliest and most destructive wildfires.

Her wildfire coverage earned significant recognition for going beyond simply describing the initial destruction of the fires to cover how the people and communities impacted work toe recover from these disasters. The California News Publishers Association recognized her work with multiple awards, including first place for "Best Writing" (2019), "Best Profile" (2019), "Best Enterprise" (2018) and "Best Feature" (2018). She was named a finalist for her fire coverage for the Livingston Award for Young Journalists in 2019, 2020, and 2021.

== Paradise: One Town's Struggle to Survive an American Wildfire ==
Johnson's first book, Paradise: One Town's Struggle to Survive an American Wildfire describes how the Camp Fire struck Paradise, California in 2018, killing 85 people and destroying the town and covers both the causes of the fire and the town's efforts to recover.

The book received widespread critical acclaim. It won the Gold Medal for nonfiction at the 2022 California Book Awards Critics praised the work for its detailed reporting and narrative power, with comparisons made to disaster-reporting classics such as 102 Minutes and Five Days at Memorial.

In 2025, the book was adapted into a feature film titled The Lost Bus, directed by Paul Greengrass and starring Matthew McConaughey and America Ferrera. The film premiered at the Toronto International Film Festival on September 5, 2025, and was distributed by Apple Original Films, with a limited theatrical release on September 19 and streaming debut on Apple TV+ on October 3, 2025. The New York Times and the San Francisco Chronicle, Johnson's former employer, criticized the film as taking liberties with Johnson's original reporting. The subject of the film, Kevin McKay, said he raised concerns about the movie's inaccuracies prior to its release.

== Washington Post (2021-2026) ==
Johnson joined The Washington Post in 2021. Her story "An alleged $500 million Ponzi scheme preyed on Mormons. It ended with FBI gunfire," won the 2023 Freedom of the Press Catalyst Award and the National Press Club President's Award. The story was the last story that the slain investigative reporter Jeff German had been working on when he was killed by a local politician whose misdeeds German had covered. The story was produced in a partnership between the Post and the Las Vegas Review-Journal, German's paper, which devoted the entire Sunday front page to Johnson's story.

In the Columbia Journalism Review article in 2020, Johnson describes covering destructive wildfires as "the closest thing to being a war correspondent in the United States." In June 2025, she became an actual war correspondent in Ukraine, based in Kyiv, despite not speaking any Ukrainian. "[I] basically learned the alphabet and how to say Thank you, and How are you?" she said. Johnson, together with Anastacia Galouchka and Kamila Hrabchuk, were recognized as finalists for the 2025 Livingston Award in International Reporting.

=== "Laid off in a war zone" ===
In January 2026, Johnson posted about the realities of reporting from a region where Russia's repeated attacks on the power grid left people without power, heat, or water — writing in pencil because the ink in her pens had frozen: "But the work here in Kyiv continues... Despite how difficult this job can be, I am proud to be a foreign correspondent at The Washington Post."

Days later, The Washington Post laid Johnson off, by email. Johnson posted "I was just laid off by The Washington Post in the middle of a warzone. I have no words."

Johnsons' story was widely cited in coverage of the Post layoffs, which cut newsroom staff by 300. The Post's previous executive editor, Marty Baron, said that it was clear the move was designed to curry favor with President Donald Trump. Others contrasted the wealth of Jeff Bezos, the owner of the Post, with drive to cut costs at the paper. The Washington Post strongly commentary that implied that Johnson and other laid-off employees were "stranded." The Post wrote on X. "The Washington Post is actively supporting employees impacted by last week’s restructuring, including transition support for our international employees."
