= Greta Thunberg: A Year to Change the World =

2021 documentary series

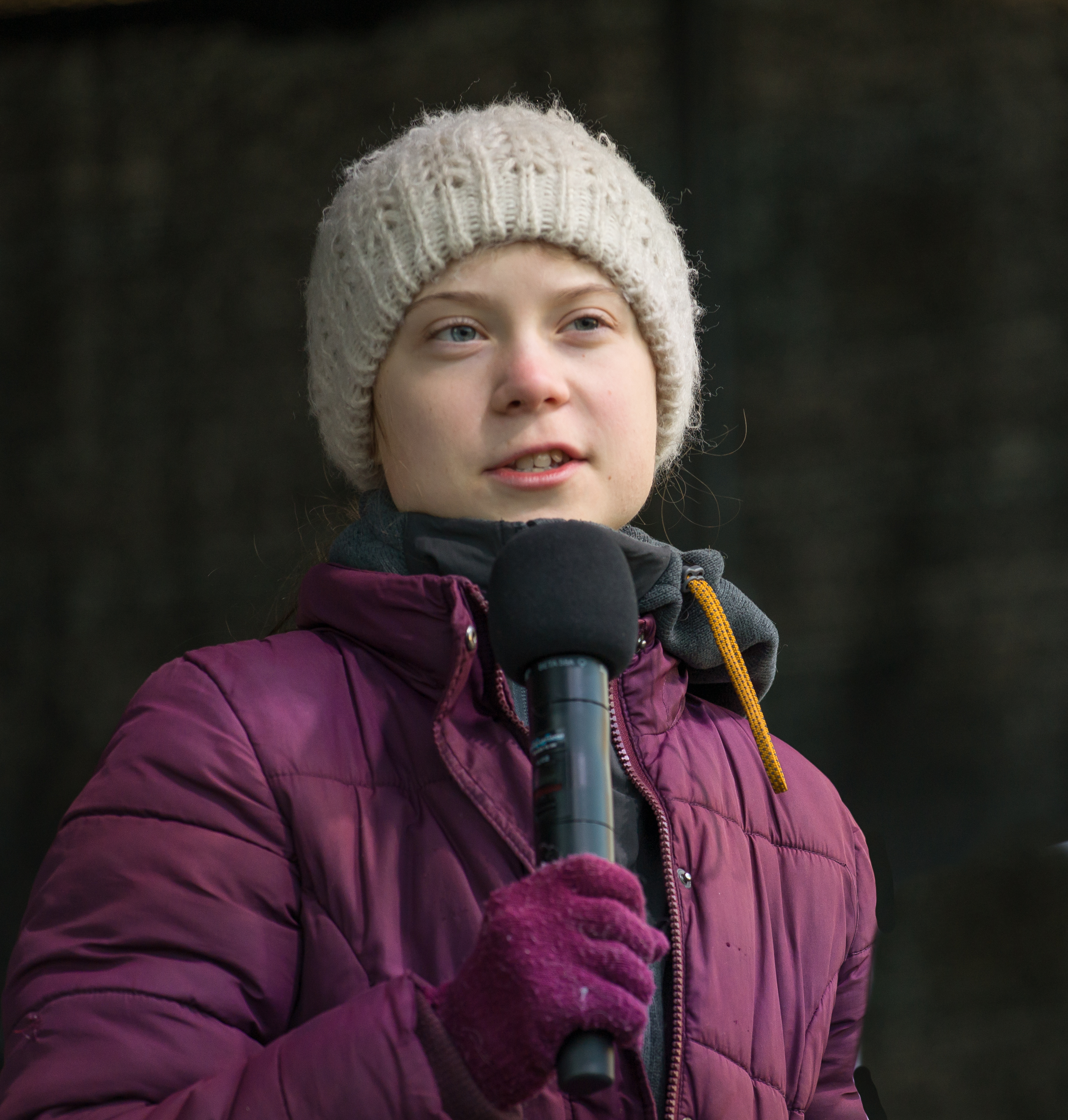
- Greta Thunberg, pictured in February 2020
- Genre: Documentary series
- Presented by: Greta Thunberg
- Narrated by: Paul McGann
- Composer: Ty Unwin
- Country of origin: United Kingdom
- Original language: English
- No. of seasons: 1
- No. of episodes: 3

Production
- Executive producers: Rob Liddell & Helen Thomas
- Producer: Joe Myerscough
- Production company: BBC Studios Science Unit

Original release
- Network: BBC One
- Release: 12 April – 26 April 2021

Greta Thunberg: A Year to Change the World is a three-part documentary series following the climate change activist Greta Thunberg from August 2019 to late 2020, when she was aged 16–17. She travels North America and Europe, hearing experts talk about the complex and diverse effects climate change has had, including damage to forests, the retreat of glaciers, ocean acidification and flash flooding. The series also explores methods to combat climate change such as carbon capture and helping wetlands and mangroves to flourish, but finds that such solutions cannot be rolled out fast enough to be the only part of a climate change mitigation plan. Additionally, Thunberg speaks at conferences, meets the natural historian David Attenborough and attends climate strikes. Plans for filming in other parts of the world were abandoned when the COVID-19 pandemic restricted travel from March 2020 onwards.

== Production ==
Thunberg said that the motivation for the project was "to give science a voice and to really go more in depth". She wanted viewers not to "say, 'Oh, that's nice,' and just go on like before", but for it to make "a lasting impact". The series takes place in North America and Europe. Plans for journeying to the Global South and to East Asia—in particular to China, via Trans-Siberian Railway—were thwarted by the COVID-19 pandemic. Thunberg estimated that they had over 100 days of filming planned and that only a quarter was achieved. When she returned to Stockholm at the start of the pandemic, she and her father were ill. Her father found that he had COVID-19, but Thunberg could not take a test as she was underage.

Thunberg said in April 2021 that she hoped to later visit countries including China, Japan and South Korea which she had planned to for the documentary. She also said that all of the fashion, car, oil and air travel companies they asked for interviews declined.

Academic consultants for the series included professors at the Open University: Emma Dewberry, a Design for Sustainability lecturer; David Humphreys, an Environmental Policy professor; and Neil Edwards, an Earth System Science professor.

BBC Studios announced production of the series in February 2020.

== Release ==
In February 2021 it was announced that it would air on the BBC One in the United Kingdom and on PBS in the United States. In the U.K., the first episode premiered on 12 April in the Monday 9 p.m. timeslot. In the U.S., to celebrate Earth Day, the three episodes aired consecutively on 22 April from 8 to 11 p.m. The series was released on the streaming platform Hulu on the same day. In Australia, the series was aired weekly beginning 26 April on ABC Television and was made available on its streaming platform, iview. The series is available for free streaming from the Norwegian broadcaster NRK starting 24 August 2021, with subtitles in Norwegian.

== Episodes ==
List of episodes
No.	Title	Original release date	UK viewers (millions)
1	"Episode 1"	12 April 2021	N/A
With her father Svante, Greta travels to an Edmonton climate strike in Alberta, Canada, which is met with a pro-oil and gas counter-protest. In the Jasper National Park, Greta learns how pine beetle infestations are damaging trees—prior to global warming, cold winters would kill more of them. A third of the Athabasca Glacier's volume has been lost over the past century; it is needed for irrigation and drinking water. In California, Greta speaks to a Paradise resident whose town was victim to the Camp Fire wildfire of 2018. The United Nations' COP25 conference is relocated from Chile to Madrid, Spain, so Greta must cross the Atlantic by boat, avoiding plane for its greenhouse gas emissions. An expert notes that 1% of people account for 50% of aviation emissions. In the Atlantic, there is ocean acidification—90% of tropical coral reefs may be lost with 1.5 °C of warming, and 99% with 2 °C. The emissions budget for limiting warming to 1.5 °C will be exceeded in 2030 if substantial changes are not made. At Madrid, Greta delivers a fact-based speech, reasoning that when she uses emotional phrases, these become the headlines. She travels to Copenhagen for Christmas.
2	"Episode 2"	19 April 2021	N/A
Greta travels to Jokkmokk, Sweden, where a Sámi tribe has needed to give reindeer extra food to avoid starvation, as increasingly much lichen is trapped beneath ice layers formed by additional rain caused by warmer temperatures. Greta travels to Gdańsk, Poland, to learn why climate change is causing increased flash flooding. She hears also about an estimated 2500 deaths from the 2019 European heat wave. In the Alps, an expert measures the amount that snow cover is counterintuitively keeping the ground warm. Permafrost covers 15% of the Northern Hemisphere, but thawing soil is decreasing this and releasing methane, a potent greenhouse gas. At the World Economic Forum in Davos, Greta urges an immediate divestment from fossil fuels, but finds news media are only interested in reporting a perceived clash between the appearance of her and Donald Trump. In the UK, she visits Drax Power Station, where a carbon capture trial is in its early stages, but will not be rolled out fast enough to be the only solution to offsetting greenhouse gas emissions. Greta meets David Attenborough before celebrating the scrapping of Bristol Airport expansion plans with activists who opposed it.
3	"Episode 3"	26 April 2021	N/A
The Paris Agreement committed to limit global warming to 2 °C, with 1.5 °C as a target, but current projections see a 3 °C warming by 2100. Greta addresses the European Parliament, saying that its Green Deal target is loophole-ridden and too slow. Restrictions from the COVID-19 pandemic cause a 7% decrease in emissions in 2020 compared to 2019, but to hit the 1.5 °C target, such a decrease would need to continue annually until 2030. Forests use carbon for photosynthesis but emit it from plant and microbe respiration. Older forests can become carbon sinks, but it may take three decades for a forest to reach net zero emissions. Wetlands, mangroves and farming some seafoods can absorb carbon dioxide. Greta visits projects to store atmospheric carbon dioxide in rocks, and to adapt cow feed to restrict methane emissions—these projects can only be part of a solution, not the entirety. Greta talks to Angela Merkel, to demand EU countries stop investing in fossil fuel, and a Copenhagen politician, whose city plans to reach net zero by 2025, but only by discounting emission sources such as its airport. After her year off, Greta returns to school.

== Reception ==
Emily Baker rated the series five out of five stars in i, praising the approachability of the scientific information, and that the documentary's focus on such content was "living up to its subjects wishes". Baker found Thunberg's "quiet rage" to be "inspiring" and "validated by scientists at every turn", while praising the "moments of intimacy" between Thunberg and her father. In a four star review, The Independent's Sean O'Grady found the series "predictable, but still awesome". O'Grady praised "breathtaking and depressing" scenery in the Rocky Mountains and Thunberg's "self-possessed" nature, finding the piece "a monument to our new religion of environmentalism". Suzi Feay of the Financial Times rated the first episode four stars. Chris Bennion of The Telegraph gave it three stars, saying that Thunberg was "right about climate change" but that the most emotional content is Thunberg's father talking about her. Bennion said, in response to Thunberg's assertion that people should listen to scientists rather than her, "Whether the Thunbergs like it or not, the world still wants to listen to Greta".

Ben Dowell of The Times praised of the "mesmerising" episode that Thunberg's "determination and quiet intelligence radiate", while her father is "engaging" and "speaks movingly of his parental fears and concerns". Writing for New Scientist, Karina Shah found that the series "presents a more delicate side" of Thunberg. Shah said that it is "difficult to demonstrate the urgency of climate change" but that "by showcasing Thunberg's journey ... the evidence presents itself every day". The Observer's Euan Ferguson was positively surprised by Thunberg's likeability and amount of knowledge, in contradiction to how critics present her. Hugo Rifkind of The Times wanted the documentary to address why people are attracted to Thunberg's criticism and listen to her, but did not find an answer. Rifkind found the science uninteresting and sad, in contrast to Thunberg.
