= Centerville, Butte County, California =

Unincorporated community in California, United States

Centerville, California
- Unincorporated community
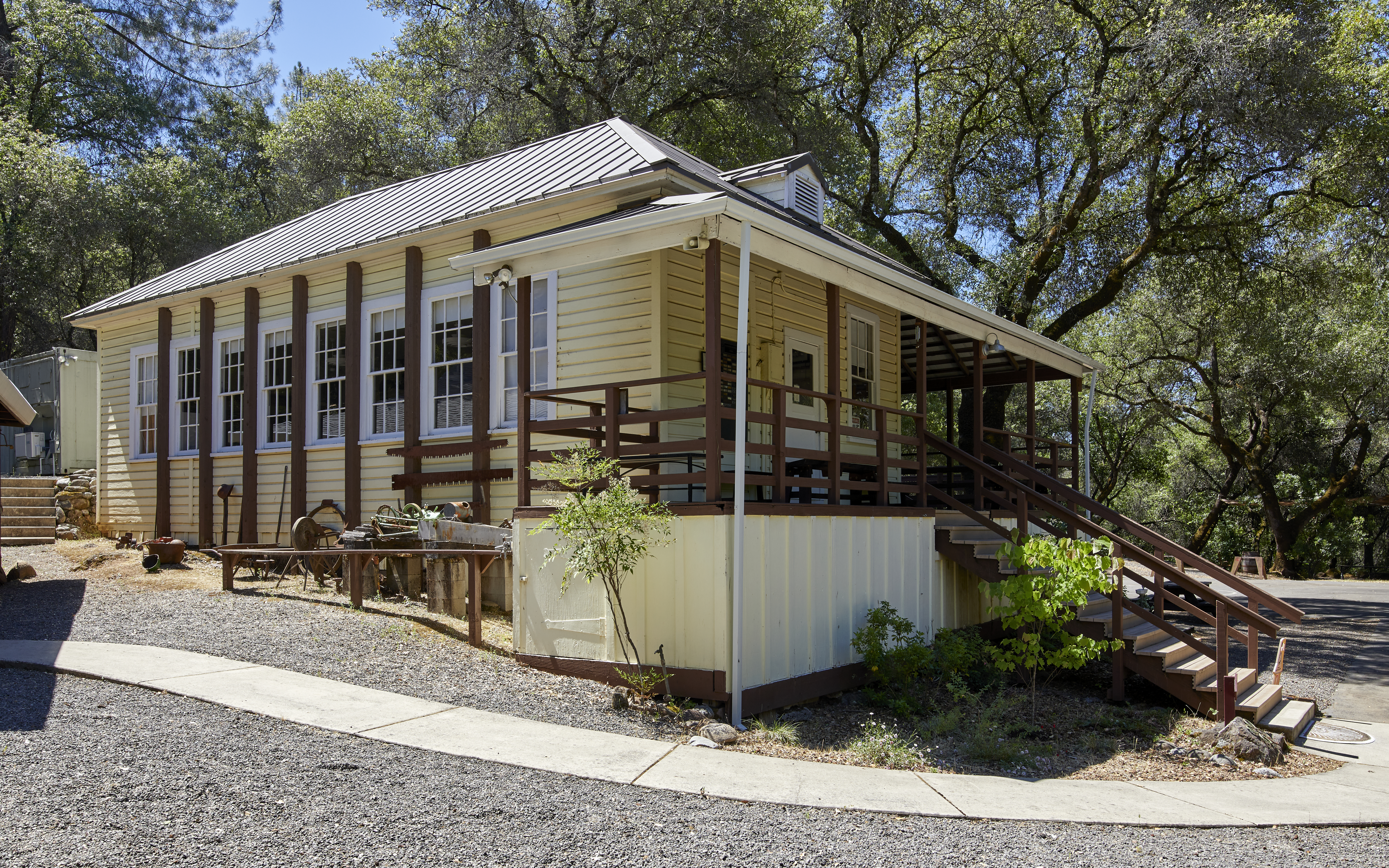
- Historic Centerville Schoolhouse in 2020

- Location in California Centerville, California (the United States)
- Coordinates: 39°47′16″N 121°39′19″W
- Country: United States
- State: California
- County: Butte
- Elevation: 659 ft (201 m)

Centerville is an unincorporated community in Butte County, California, United States, situated along Butte Creek. It was midway between Helltown and Diamondville. The area is approximately one and three-quarter miles, straight-line distance, west of Paradise.

== Geography ==
The US Geological Survey defines it as a populated place with a feature ID of 1658249. The community is 659 feet (201 m) above mean sea level. The area is served by area code 530. Access to the area is via Honey Run Road off Skyway Avenue, approximately 1.5 miles (2.4 km) east of State Route 99.

== History ==
The post office was named for John Adams, its first postmaster, and operated from 1880 to 1913.

Centerville Cemetery is located less than a mile northeast at 39°47′58″N 121°38′46″W (NAD27).

Centerville Power Plant is a small hydroelectric power plant in the community. When the plant is in operation, the volume of water in the creek goes up. Signs downstream along Butte Creek warn that the water level can rise suddenly without warning. The facility was built in 1900 and generates electricity using water facilities that once supplied a hydraulic mine during California's Gold Rush.
