= National Fire Danger Rating System =

Wildfire hazard scale

National Fire Danger Rating System (NFDRS) is used in the United States to provide a measure of the relative seriousness of burning conditions and threat of wildfires.

== Background ==
John J. Keetch, a fire researcher in the southeast, wrote that "One of the prime objectives of the National Fire Danger Rating System (NFDRS) is to provide as accurate a measure as possible of the relative seriousness of burning conditions and thereby, NFDRS can serve as an aid to fire control programs."

In 1954 there were eight different fire danger rating systems in use across the United States. Better communication and better transportation were beginning to make mutual assistance agreements between fire control agencies more practical than in the past. State compacts, and in the case of the federal government, interagency and interregional agreements were bringing fire control teams together from widely separated areas of the county. It became necessary to establish a national system for estimating fire danger and fire behavior to improve and simplify communications among all people concerned with wildland fire.

Work on a national rating system began in 1959. By 1961, the basic structure for a four-phase rating system had been outlined and the fire phase (spread phase) was ready for field testing. However, since the remaining phases of the rating system – ignition, risk, and fuel energy – were not available, a number of fire control agencies preferred to remain with the systems then in use. Adaptations, interpretations, and additions to the spread phase quickly followed, making it obvious that the spread phase was not uniformly applicable across the country.

More research followed and in 1965 a research project headquartered in Seattle was established to provide a fresh look at the needs and requirements for a national, fire danger, rating system. After canvassing many fire control agencies across the country, the Seattle research group recommended new directions for research that would lead to the development of a complete, comprehensive, National Fire Danger Rating System. A target date of 1972 was established for getting a complete system ready for operational use.

In 1970, a preliminary version of the system was tested at field sites in Arizona and New Mexico. In 1971, an improved version of the system was used operationally in the Southwest. Field trials were also conducted elsewhere across the country at stations from Maine to California and from Florida to Alaska. The system then became operational nationwide in 1972.

When work started in 1968 on the NFDRS a framework was constructed. A philosophy had to be adopted in order to allow the development of the system to proceed. NFDRS provides a uniform consistent system that possesses standards which agencies with wildfire suppression responsibility can apply and interpret.

NFDRS characterizes expected burning conditions for areas of 10,000 to 100,000 ac (4000 to 40,000 ha). The system has a low resolution.

- Considers initiating fires only.
- Considers containment as opposed to extinguishment.
- Relates containment job to flame length.
- The ratings are to be interpretable and meaningful.
- Ratings are to be used in combination.
- Ratings are to be linear and relative.
- Ratings between fuel models are comparable.
- Ratings are for the worst case in the Fire Danger Rating Area.

== Types of fire ==
NFDRS recognizes four types of fire:

1. Ground fires burn in natural litter, duff, roots or sometimes high organic soils. Once started they are very difficult to detect and control.
2. Surface fires burn in grasses and low shrubs (up to 4.ft tall) or in the lower branches of trees. Surface fires may move rapidly. Ease of control depends upon the fuel involved.
3. Crown fires burn in the tops of trees. Once started, they are very difficult to control since wind plays an important role in crown fires.
4. Spotting fires can be produced by crown fires as well as wind and topography conditions. Large burning embers are thrown ahead of the main fire. Once spotting begins, the fire will be very difficult to control.

== Structure ==
NFDRS is a complex set of equations with user-defined constants and measured variables to calculate the daily index and components that can be used for decision support.

A Fire Danger Rating level takes into account current and antecedent weather, fuel types, and live and dead fuel moisture.

== Preparedness Classes ==
The bottom line of the National Fire Danger Rating System in the day-to-day operation of a fire prevention and suppression program is the staffing class. The staffing class is sometimes referred to as the action class, adjective class, precaution class, preparedness class, or the Industrial Fire Precaution Level (IFPL).

The assumption behind staffing levels is that the continuum of fire danger can be divided into discrete intervals to which preplanned management actions are keyed. In other words, for each staffing level or adjective class, there should be a management action that addresses the dispatch of suppression resources that constitutes an appropriate level of response. Staffing levels, or adjective class ratings, are ways of linking fire danger information to fire management decisions. The designations for the various class or staffing levels are numerical (I to IV), or adjective (Low to Extreme).

The first step in establishing staffing levels is the selection by the state or federal land management agency of an NFDRS component or index that best describes the total fire problems in their protection area. Both state and federal land management agencies in Washington use the Energy Release Component (ERC) to determine staffing levels or adjective class ratings for the general public.

From statistical analysis of historical fire weather data, agencies were able to determine various percentiles in the distribution of historical ERC data that serve as breakpoints for various fire management decisions. Land management agencies in Washington use the 90th and 97th percentile of the ERC as a basis for determining staffing levels. In Western Washington, the 90th and 97th percentiles in the ERC frequency distribution are 44 BTUs per square foot and 55 BTUs per square foot.

== Outputs ==
The output section of the NFDRS structure chart is the components or simply the outputs that are based in fire behavior description but expressed in the broader context of fire danger rating.

1. Spread Component – Displays a value numerically equivalent to the predicted forward rate of spread of a head fire in feet per minute. It is a function of fuel model characteristics, live fuel moistures, the 0 to 3-inch (76 mm) dead fuel moisture (heavily weighted to the 1-hour timelag fuels), wind speed and slope class. It is highly variable from relative humidity, wind, and live fuel moisture.
2. Ignition Component – Displays the probability of a firebrand causing an ignition requiring a suppression action.
3. Keetch-Byram drought index
4. Burning Index – An NFDRS index relating to the flame length at the head of the fire, it is an estimate of the potential difficulty of fire control as a function of how fast and how hot a fire could burn. It has been scaled so that the value, divided by 10, predicts the flame length at the head of a fire. For example, an index of 75 would predict a flame length of 7.5 feet (2.3 m). It is a function of the Spread Component and the Energy Release Component and has moderate variability. It is sensitive to fuel models.and can trace seasonal trends reasonably well for models with heavy dead or live components. Because it uses wind and relative humidity, it is also very sensitive to weather observation errors.

== Adjective Class Levels ==
Fire Danger is expressed using these levels.

1. LOW – Fuels do not ignite readily from small firebrands although a more intense heat source, such as lightning, may start fires in duff or light fuels.
2. MODERATE – Fires can start from most accidental causes, but with the exception of lightning fires in some areas, the number of starts is generally low.
3. HIGH – All fine dead fuels ignite readily and fires start easily from most causes.
4. VERY HIGH – Fires start easily from all causes and, immediately after ignition, spread rapidly and increase quickly in intensity.
5. EXTREME – Fires start quickly, spread furiously, and burn intensely. All fires are potentially serious.

== Maps ==
Each day during the fire season, national maps of selected fire weather and Fire danger components of the National Fire Danger Rating System are produced by the Wildland Fire Assessment System (WFAS-MAPS), located at the USDA Forest Service Rocky Mountain Research Station in Missoula, Montana. Current fire danger and forecast fire danger maps are available.
