= Black Bear Diner =

Chain of restaurants in the Western United States

BBDI LLC.

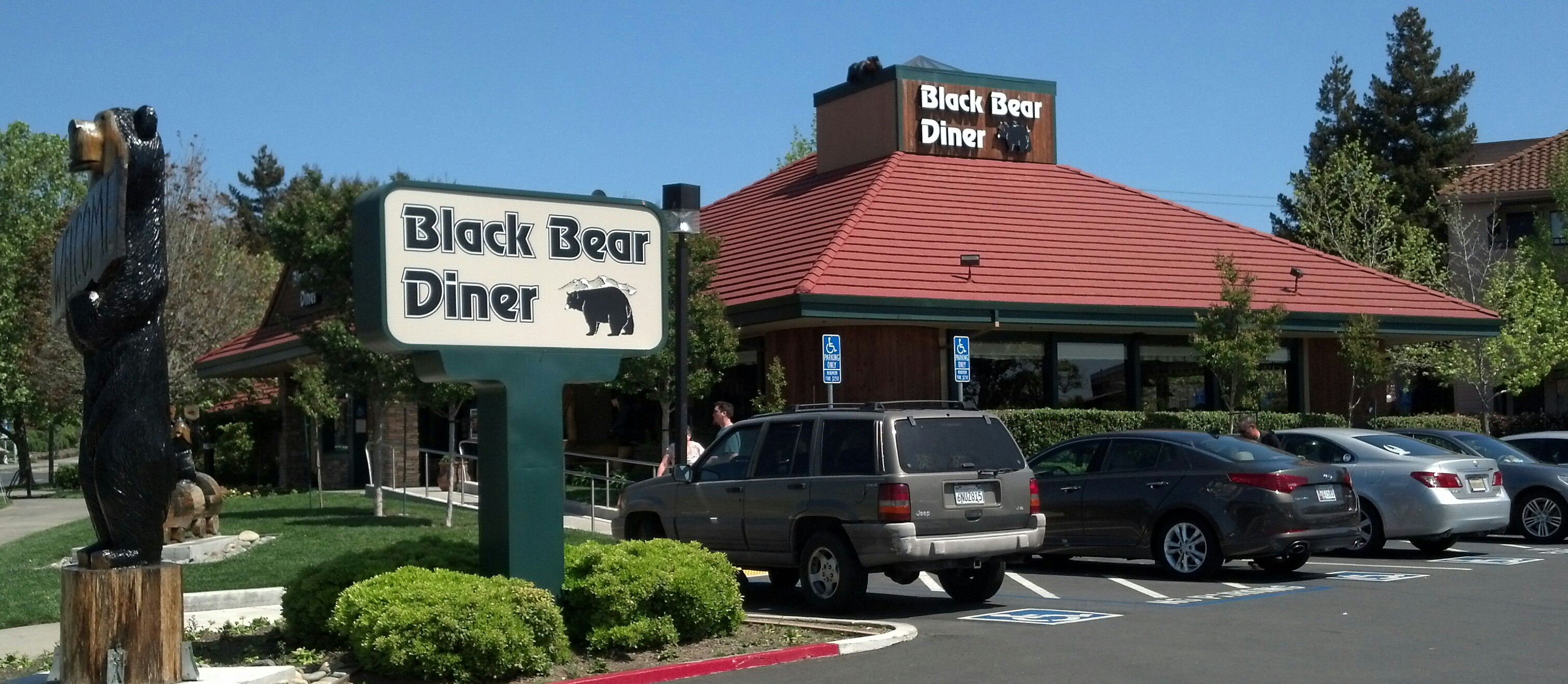
- Black Bear Diner in Vallejo, California
- Trade name: Black Bear Diner
- Type: Private
- Industry: Restaurants Franchising
- Founded: 1995; 31 years ago
- Founder: Bruce Dean; Bob Manley; Laurie Manley
- Headquarters: Redding, California, U.S.
- Number of locations: 161
- Owner: Bruce Dean
- Website: blackbeardiner.com

BBDI LLC., doing business as Black Bear Diner, is a restaurant chain in the Western United States which serves homestyle and "old-fashioned" comfort foods. Black Bear Diner has 166 locations in 14 states as of August 2025.

== History ==
The first restaurant was opened in Mount Shasta, California in 1995, founded by Bruce Dean and Bob & Laurie Manley. The company is based in Redding, California.

The company's leadership announced plans to be a "coast to coast" brand in January 2024.

== Design ==
Each Black Bear Diner location has decor with a rustic motif and "over-the-top bear paraphernalia." Every restaurant is decorated with a 12-foot-tall (3.7 m) black bear carving by artist Ray Schulz. Additional murals and artwork are created for each restaurant by Steve and Gary Fitzgerald and Colleen Mitchell-Veyna.

== Menu ==
Black Bear Diner offers family meals such as breakfast, burgers, salads, and shakes. Baked goods prepared on site are offered, and some locations offer alcohol sales, provided the customer is at least 21.

The menu format mimics an old newspaper titled The Black Bear Gazette, with articles on the front page. The children's menu is similarly styled with the title The Beary Tale Times and features children's activities.

== Gallery ==
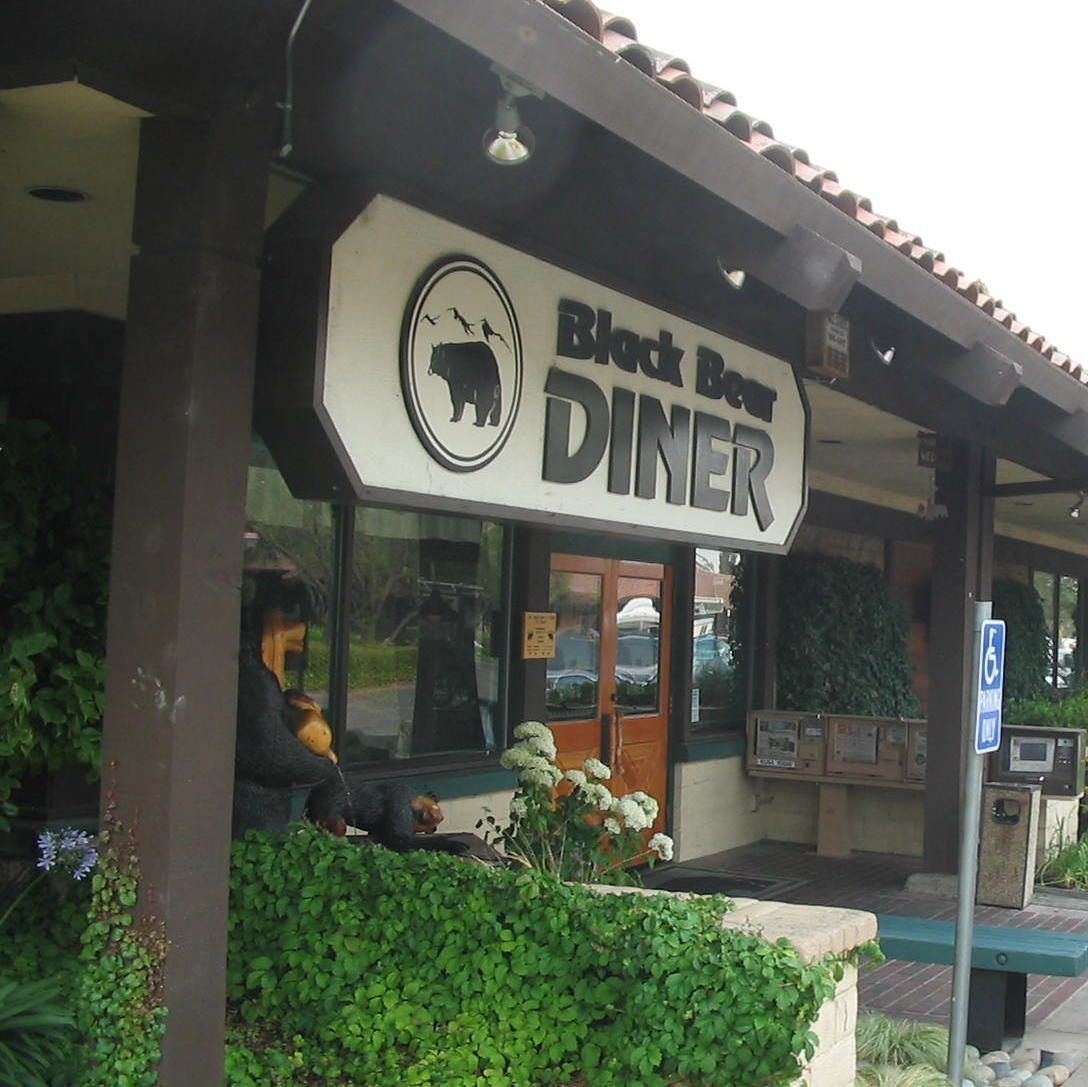
Black Bear Diner in Napa, California

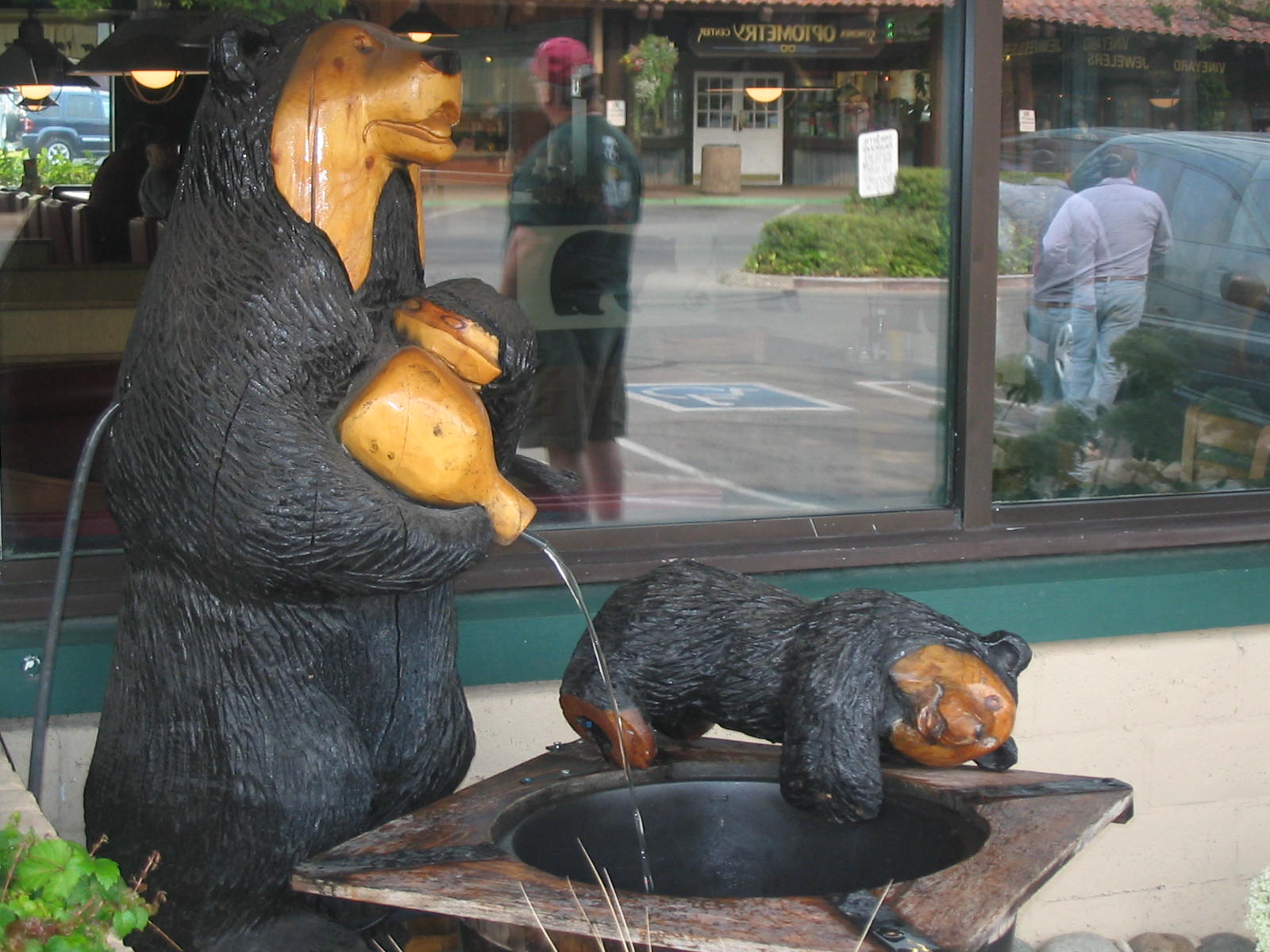
Black Bear Diner carvings with a fountain

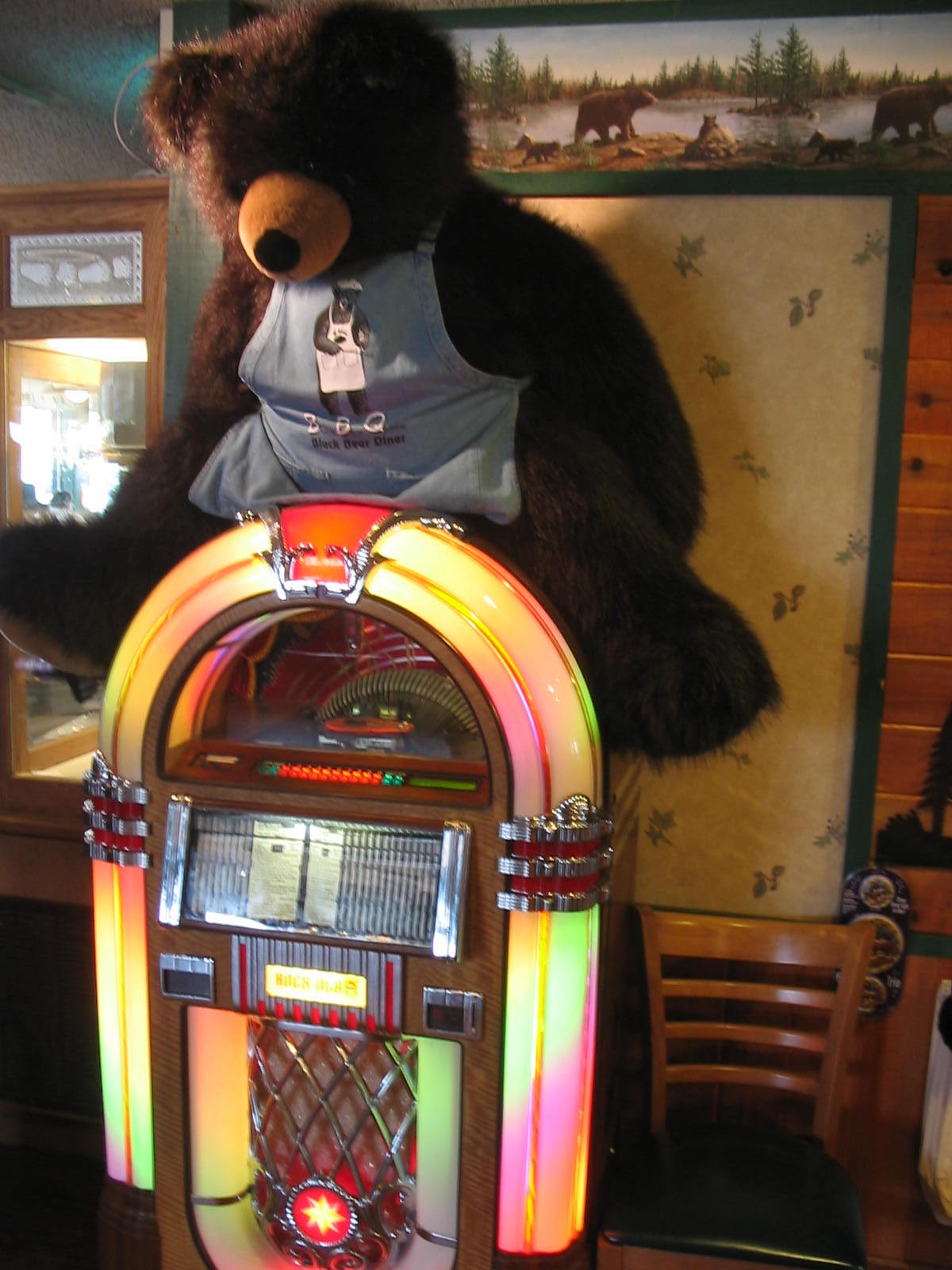
A jukebox in Black Bear Diner

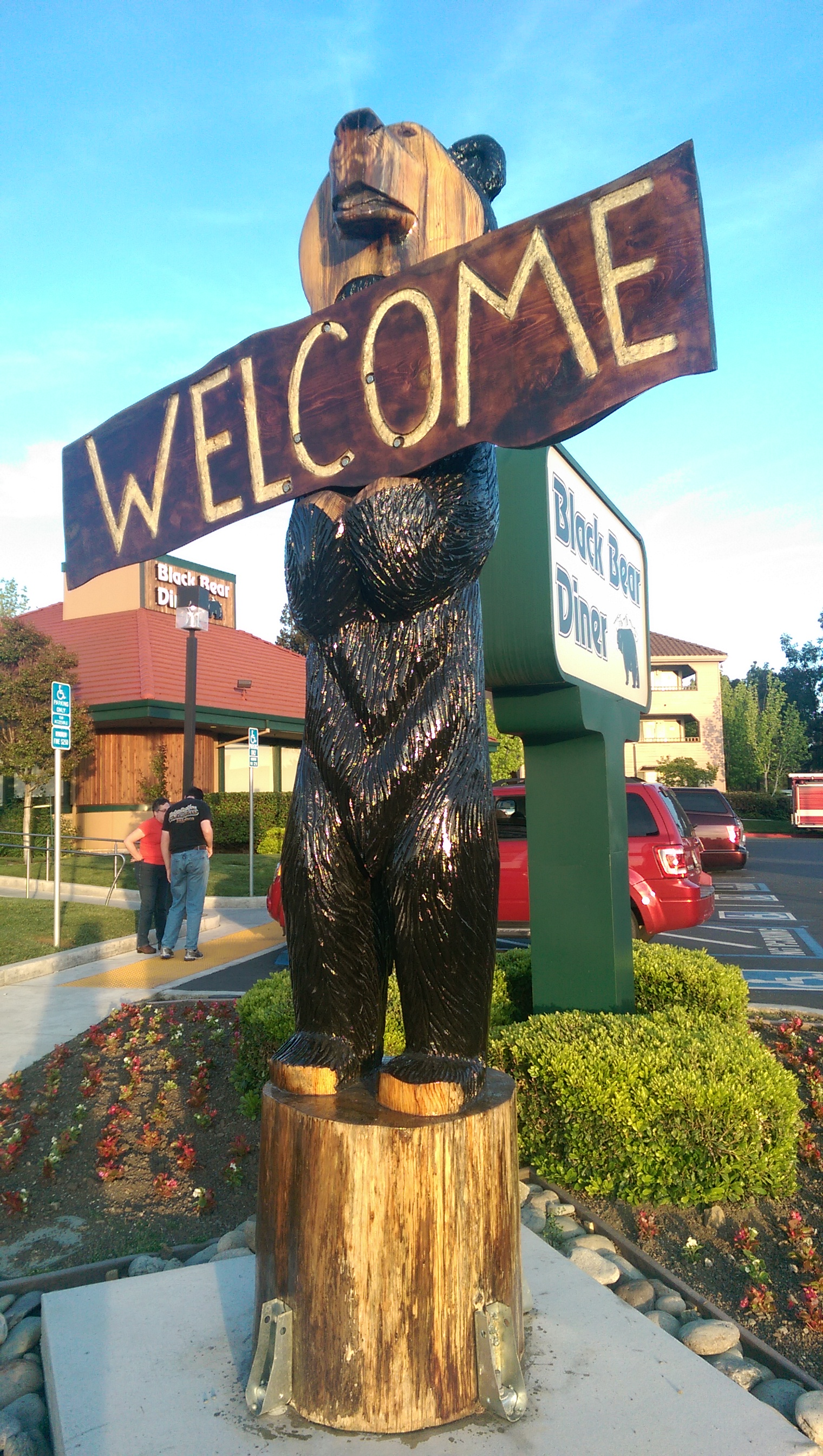
Carved wooden bear sign at a Black Bear Diner

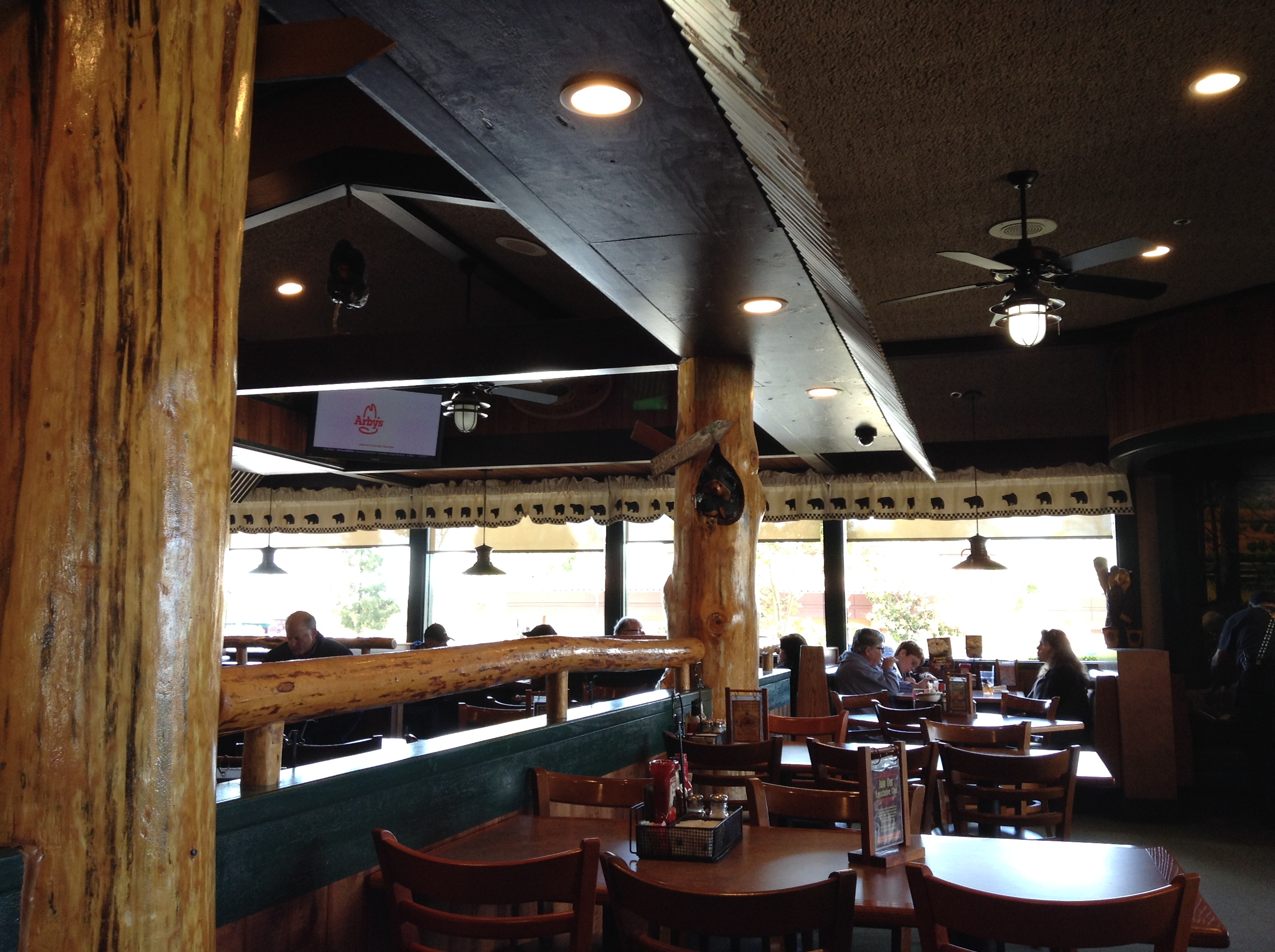
Interior of a Black Bear Diner in California

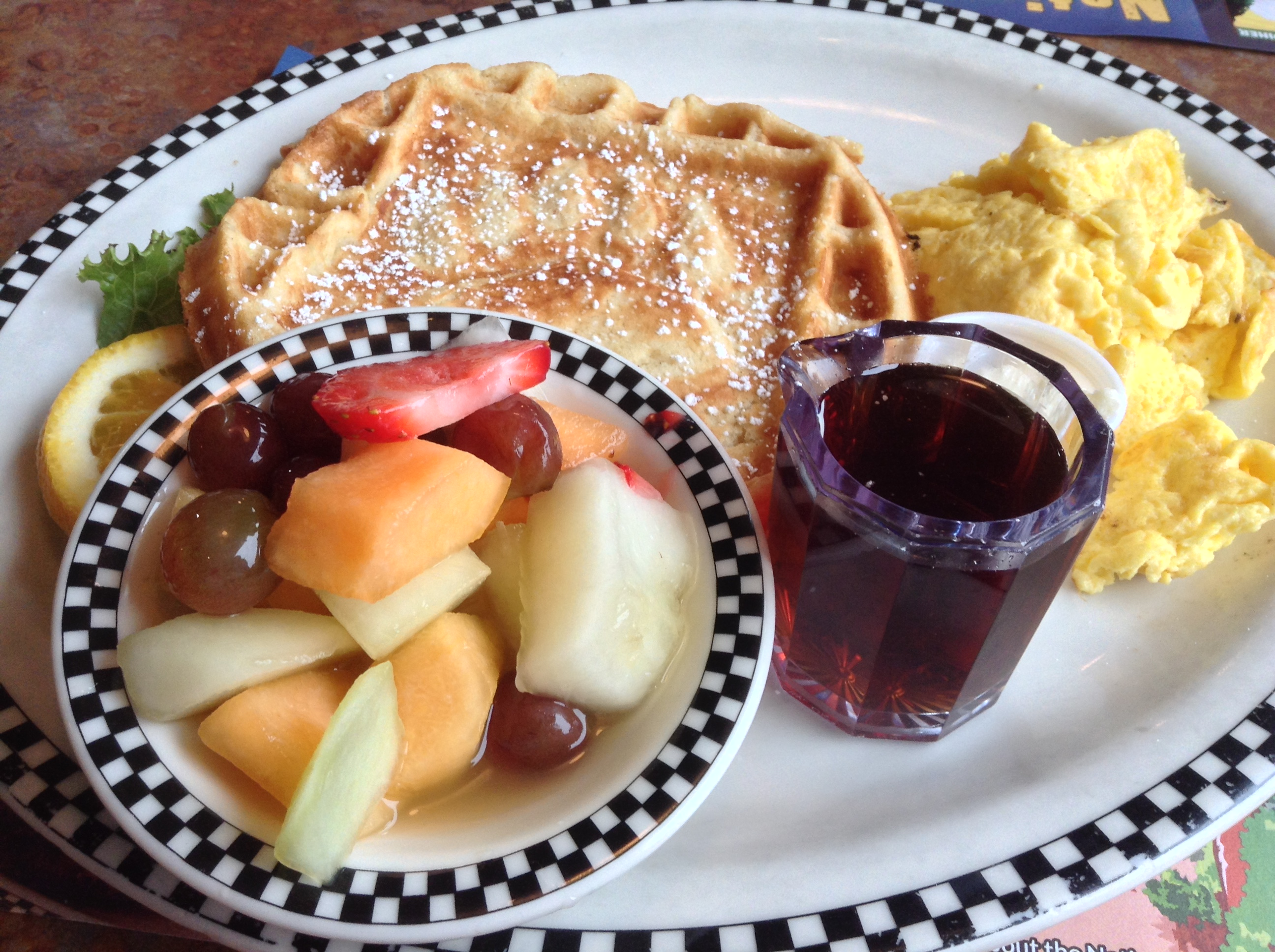
Breakfast at the Black Bear Diner

== Locations ==
Black Bear Diner Locations in the United States by State
State	Number of Locations	City
California	70	American Canyon, Anaheim, Arvin, Bakersfield, Barstow, Buellton, Chico, Chino, Citrus Heights, Colma, Davis, El Cajon, Elk Grove, Fresno, Fullerton, Gilroy, Hanford, Hayward, Los Banos, Manteca, Menifee, Merced, Modesto, Moreno Valley, Mount Shasta, Murrieta, Napa, Oakland, Oakdale, Placerville, Pleasanton, Porterville, Rancho Cucamonga, Red Bluff, Redding, Redwood City, Rohnert Park, Roseville, Sacramento, Salinas, San Jose, San Rafael, Santa Ana, Santa Clarita, Signal Hill, Sonoma, Suisun City, Sunnyvale, Tarzana, Torrance, Tracy, Tulare, Turlock, Ukiah, Vacaville, Vallejo, Visalia, Watsonville, Woodland, Yreka, Yuba City
Texas	27	Alliance, Austin, Brownsville, Conroe, Cypress, Dallas, El Paso, Fort Worth, Grand Prairie, Harker Heights, Houston, Humble, Katy, Laredo, League City, McAllen, Mesquite, Pasadena, Plano, San Antonio, Shenandoah, Sugar Land, Tomball, The Woodlands, Waco
Arizona	15	Avondale, Bullhead City, Chandler, Eloy, Gilbert, Glendale, Goodyear, Mesa, Phoenix, Scottsdale, Tempe, Tucson, Yuma
Utah	12	American Fork, Midvale, Ogden, Orem, Riverton, Salt Lake City, Sandy, St. George, Tooele, West Valley City, Woods Cross
Oregon	11	Beaverton, Bend, Gresham, Madras, Medford, Milwaukie, Newberg, Portland, Salem, Troutdale, Wilsonville
Nevada	7	Henderson, Las Vegas, Reno, Sparks, West Wendover
Colorado	6	Aurora, Colorado Springs, Fountain, Pueblo
Washington	6	Bellingham, Federal Way, Lakewood, Olympia, Puyallup, Sequim, Vancouver
Idaho	4	Boise, Chubbuck, Idaho Falls, Twin Falls
Oklahoma	4	Midwest City, Moore, Oklahoma City, Tulsa
Arkansas	2	Fayetteville, North Little Rock
Missouri	2	Independence, Joplin, St. Charles
Kansas	2	Garden City, Olathe
Illinois	1	Morris
