= Helltown, California =

Unincorporated community in California, United States

- Unincorporated community
- Location in California Helltown, California (the United States)
- Coordinates: 39°48′42″N 121°39′35″W
- Country: United States
- State: California
- County: Butte
- Elevation: 873 ft (266 m)

Helltown (formerly, Butte Creek and Hilltown) is an unincorporated community in Butte County, California, United States. It lies 4 miles (6.4 km) north-northwest of Paradise, at an elevation of 873 feet (266 m) inside Butte Creek Canyon.

Helltown was founded as a mining community, but by the 1970s was home to a small population of hippies. The community was nearly destroyed by the Camp Fire in 2018.
