= Energy release component =

The energy release component (ERC) is a number related to the available energy (BTU) per unit area (square foot) within the flaming front at the head of a fire. Daily variations in ERC are due to changes in moisture content of the various fuels present, both live and dead. Since this number represents the potential "heat release" per unit area in the flaming zone, it can provide guidance to several important fire activities. It may also be considered a composite fuel moisture value as it reflects the contribution that all live and dead fuels have to potential fire intensity. The ERC is a cumulative or "build-up" type of index. As live fuels cure and dead fuels dry, the ERC values get higher, thus providing a good reflection of drought conditions. The scale is open-ended or unlimited and, as with other NFDRS components, is relative. Conditions producing an ERC value of 24 represent a potential heat release twice that of conditions resulting in an ERC value of 12.

== Sources ==
This article incorporates text from a publication of the U.S. Department of Agriculture (USDA) with content in the public domain.

- Bradshaw, L.S., R.E. Burgan, J.D. Cohen, and J.E. Deeming. 1983. The 1978 National Fire Danger Rating System: Technical Documentation. USDA Forest Service; Intermountain Forest and Range Experiment Station, General Technical Report INT-169, Ogden, Utah. 44 pp.
