= National Register of Historic Places listings in Butte County, California =

Location of Butte County in California

This is a list of the National Register of Historic Places listings in Butte County, California.

This is intended to be a complete list of the properties and districts on the National Register of Historic Places in Butte County, California, United States. Latitude and longitude coordinates are provided for many National Register properties and districts; these locations may be seen together in an online map.

There are 29 properties and districts listed on the National Register in the county.

This National Park Service list is complete through NPS recent listings posted September 4, 2026.

== Current listings ==
	Name on the Register	Image	Date listed	Location	City or town	Description
1	Allen-Sommer-Gage House	Allen-Sommer-Gage House	April 13, 1977 (#77000288)	410 Normal St. 39°43′36″N 121°50′30″W	Chico	
2	Bidwell Mansion	Bidwell Mansion	March 24, 1972 (#72000216)	Sowillenno Ave. 39°43′59″N 121°50′32″W	Chico	
3	Centerville Schoolhouse	Centerville Schoolhouse	March 24, 1972 (#72000219)	2 miles northeast of Paradise on Humbug Rd. 39°47′17″N 121°39′17″W	Paradise	
4	A. H. Chapman House	A. H. Chapman House	January 28, 1982 (#82002170)	256 E. 12th St. 39°43′30″N 121°50′27″W	Chico	
5	W. W. Durham House	W. W. Durham House	April 2, 1992 (#92000316)	2280 Durham-Dayton Rd. 39°38′48″N 121°47′36″W	Durham	
6	Forks of Butte		January 2, 2004 (#03001357)	Address restricted	Paradise	
7	Gianella Bridge	Gianella Bridge	July 8, 1982 (#82004614)	CA 32; 39°45′04″N 121°59′46″W	Hamilton City	Demolished in 1987.
8	Hazel Hotel	Hazel Hotel	July 13, 2001 (#01000705)	850, 860, 880, and 890 Hazel St., and 602, 608, and 620 Kentuckey; 39°21′54″N 121°41′43″W	Gridley	
9	Honey Run Covered Bridge	Honey Run Covered Bridge	June 23, 1988 (#88000920)	Honey Run Humbug Rd. 39°43′44″N 121°42′09″W	Chico	Destroyed by Camp Fire on November 8, 2018. Rebuilt between 2022 - 2025.
10	Inskip Hotel	Inskip Hotel	May 2, 1975 (#75000425)	6 miles north of Stirling on Skyway (Old Humbug Rd.); 39°59′25″N 121°32′29″W	Stirling City	
11	Fong Lee Company		March 11, 1982 (#82002173)	Address restricted	Oroville	
12	Magalia Community Church	Magalia Community Church	January 11, 1982 (#82002172)	Stirling Highway; 39°48′36″N 121°34′40″W	Magalia	
13	Mountain House Historic District		July 12, 2019 (#100004195)	13465 Oroville-Quincy Highway; 39°42′23″N 121°19′26″W	Mountain House	Destroyed by 2020 North Complex Fire
14	Mud Creek Canyon		August 14, 1973 (#73000396)	Address Restricted	Chico	
15	Oroville Carnegie Library	Oroville Carnegie Library	May 8, 2007 (#07000405)	1675 Montgomery St. 39°30′46″N 121°33′32″W	Oroville	Now the Butte County Public Law Library
16	Oroville Chinese Temple	Oroville Chinese Temple	July 30, 1976 (#76000478)	1500 Broderick St. 39°30′49″N 121°33′39″W	Oroville	
17	Oroville Commercial District (old)	Oroville Commercial District (old)	July 28, 1983 (#83001174)	Montgomery, Myers, and Huntoon Sts. and Miner Alley; 39°30′50″N 121°33′19″W	Oroville	
18	Oroville Inn	Oroville Inn	September 13, 1990 (#90001431)	2066 Bird St. 39°30′49″N 121°33′16″W	Oroville	
19	Patrick Ranch House	Patrick Ranch House	February 23, 1972 (#72000217)	3 miles southeast of Chico off U.S. Route 99E; 39°40′55″N 121°48′00″W	Chico	
20	Patrick Rancheria		February 23, 1972 (#72000218)	Address Restricted	Chico	
21	Pence Hotel and Post Office		January 12, 2026 (#100012534)	2828 Messilla Valley Road; 39°39′21″N 121°35′02″W	Oroville	
22	Silberstein Park Building	Silberstein Park Building	February 17, 1983 (#83001175)	426, 430, and 434 Broadway; 39°43′41″N 121°50′17″W	Chico	Downtown building designed by A.J. Byron, and used as a movie theater, The Lyric, and La Grande Hotel.
23	South Campus Neighborhood	South Campus Neighborhood	June 24, 1991 (#91000636)	Bounded by W. 2nd, Normal, W. 6th, and Cherry Sts. 39°43′34″N 121°50′30″W	Chico	
24	Southern Pacific Depot	Southern Pacific Depot	January 29, 1987 (#87000001)	430 Orange St. 39°43′24″N 121°50′42″W	Chico	
25	St. John's Episcopal Church	St. John's Episcopal Church	January 21, 1982 (#82002171)	230 Salem St. 39°43′44″N 121°50′25″W	Chico	
26	Stansbury House	Stansbury House	June 5, 1975 (#75000424)	307 W. 5th St. 39°43′37″N 121°50′19″W	Chico	
27	State Theatre	State Theatre	September 13, 1991 (#91001383)	1489 Myers St. 39°30′45″N 121°33′16″W	Oroville	
28	US Post Office-Chico Midtown Station	US Post Office-Chico Midtown Station	January 11, 1985 (#85000122)	141 W. 5th St. 39°43′39″N 121°50′16″W	Chico	
29	US Post Office-Oroville Main	US Post Office-Oroville Main	January 11, 1985 (#85000123)	1735 Robinson St. 39°30′40″N 121°33′27″W	Oroville	

== See also ==
- List of National Historic Landmarks in California
- National Register of Historic Places listings in California
- California Historical Landmarks in Butte County, California
