= California Historical Landmarks in Butte County =

This list includes properties and districts listed on the California Historical Landmark listing in Butte County, California. Click the "Map of all coordinates" link to the right to view a Google map of all properties and districts with latitude and longitude coordinates in the table below.

Image		Landmark name	Location	City or town	Summary
Bidwell's Bar	330	Bidwell's Bar	Lake Oroville State Recreation Area; 39°33′24″N 121°26′29″W	Oroville	
Upload Photo	840	Chico Forestry Station and Nursery	Bidwell Nature Center, Bidwell Park; 39°44′43″N 121°48′35″W	Chico	
Chinese Temple	770	Chinese Temple	1500 Broderick St. 39°30′49″N 121°33′39″W	Oroville	Also on the NRHP list as NPS-76000478
Discovery site of the last Yahi Indian	809	Discovery site of the last Yahi Indian	2547 Oroville-Quincy Hwy at Oak Ave. 39°30′44″N 121°31′16″W	Oroville	
Upload Photo	771	Dogtown Nugget discovery site	0.3 mi N of Pentz-Magalia Rd. on Skyway; 39°48′15″N 121°34′43″W	Magalia	
Hooker Oak	313	Hooker Oak	Bidwell Park; 39°44′18″N 121°49′31″W	Chico	
Mother Orange Tree of Butte County	1043	Mother Orange Tree of Butte County	400 Glen Drive; 39°30′40″N 121°30′15″W	Oroville	
Old suspension bridge	314	Old suspension bridge	Lake Oroville State Recreation Area; 39°32′15″N 121°27′15″W	Oroville	
Upload Photo	807	Oregon City	Historic district 39°35′38″N 121°31′46″W	Oregon City	
Rancho Chico and Bidwell Adobe	329	Rancho Chico and Bidwell Adobe	Bidwell Mansion State Historic Park, 525 The Esplanade; 39°43′56″N 121°50′37″W	Chico	Also on the NRHP list as NPS-72000216

== See also ==
- List of California Historical Landmarks
- National Register of Historic Places listings in Butte County, California
