= Oregon City (disambiguation) =

Oregon City is a city in Oregon.

Oregon City may also refer to:

- Oregon City, California, an unincorporated area
- USS Oregon City (CA-122), a United States Navy heavy cruiser in commission from 1946 to 1947
