= Dogtown Nugget =

Historical site Magalia, California, US

- Location within California Location within the United States
- 39.804050°N 121.578650°W
- Location: Magalia, California

California Historical Landmark
- Reference no.: 771

The Dogtown Nugget was the first large gold nugget found in California. It was found in Willard Gulch on April 12, 1859, and weighed in at 54 troy pounds (20 kg). Willard Gulch is in the southern part of Magalia, California in Butte County part of the Feather River canyon. The town of Magalia was called Mountain View, Butte Mills and Dogtown in 1859, the towns joined to become Magalia later. The site of the find was called Dogtown as Susan Basset, a miner's daughter, had many dogs that were in the area near the find. Hydraulic Mine worker Chauncey Wright found the pure gold nugget in the mud. Chauncey Wright worked for three partners that owned the mine: Phineas Willard, Ira Weatherbee and Wyatt M. Smith. Once found the nugget was taken to the town for display by a donkey. The nugget was taken to San Francisco, and melted down to make a 49-pound gold bar. The gold bar then was sold to the San Francisco Mint for $10,600. The discovery site is California Historical Landmark #771. A plaque monument was placed near the site by Native Daughters of the Golden West, Grand Parlor, Centennial Parlor 295, on June 12, 1955. In 2023 United States dollars the Dogtown Nugget is valued at $1.2 Million.

In 1869 the large 106-pound nugget Monumental Nugget was found at the Sierra Buttes Mine in Sierra City.

== See also ==
- California Historical Landmarks in Butte County
- List of gold nuggets by size
- Welcome Nugget
