= Butte Creek (Butte County, California) =

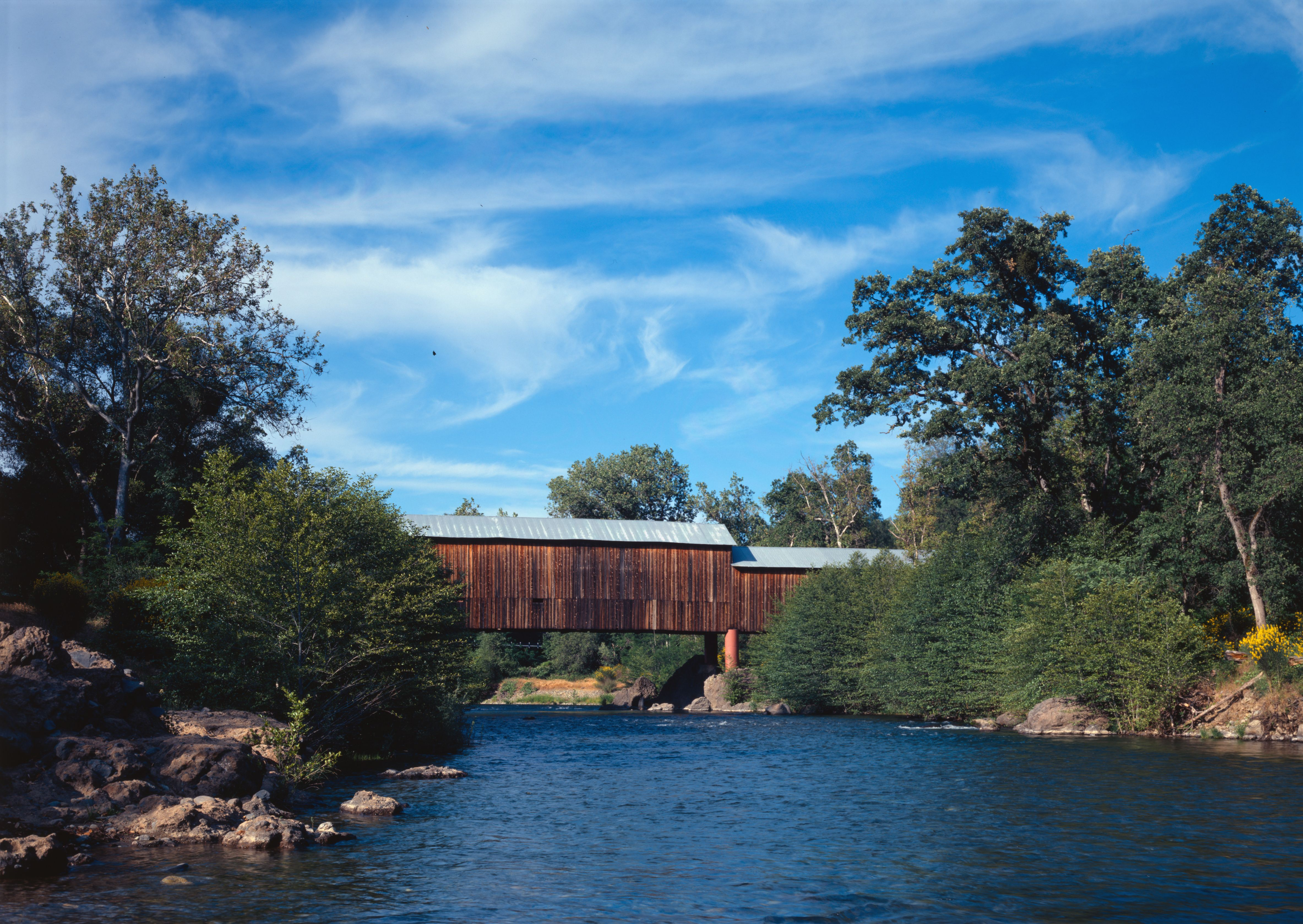
- Honey Run Covered Bridge across Butte Creek

- Location of the mouth in California

Location
- Country: United States
- State: California
- Counties: Butte, Glenn, Colusa, Sutter
- Cities: Diamondville, Chico, Durham

Physical characteristics
- Source: Near Cirby Meadow
  - location: About 5 miles (8.0 km) NE of Belden, Butte County
  - coordinates: 40°04′45″N 121°22′26″W
  - elevation: 6,260 ft (1,910 m)
- Mouth: Sacramento River
  - location: Between Colusa and Meridian
  - coordinates: 39°11′41″N 121°56′11″W
  - elevation: 52 ft (16 m)
- Length: 93 mi (150 km), North-south
- Basin size: 560 sq mi (1,500 km^{2})est.
- Discharge
  - location: Chico, CA
  - average: 411 cu ft/s (11.6 m^{3}/s)
  - minimum: 44 cu ft/s (1.2 m^{3}/s)
  - maximum: 35,600 cu ft/s (1,010 m^{3}/s)

Basin features
- River system: Sacramento River basin
- Tributaries
  - left: Little Butte Creek (Butte County, California), Hamlin Slough, Cherokee Canal

Butte Creek is a tributary to the Sacramento River, joining the river in the vicinity of Colusa, California, United States. About 93 miles (150 km) in length, it runs through much of Butte County, California (the county, however, receives its name from the Sutter Buttes in Sutter County, California). It travels through a spectacular mini-Grand Canyon as it reaches the Sacramento Valley floor, where it then flows somewhat south and west of the city of Chico towards the southwestern corner of the county.

Recent efforts have brought back Chinook salmon and steelhead runs to the stream.

There are several dams in its upper reaches. The PG&E has facilities at Centerville. The Paradise Irrigation District has Paradise Dam impounding Paradise Lake and the smaller Magalia Dam just beneath it on Little Butte Creek.

The creek was notable for the Honey Run Covered Bridge, which at 132 years old was the last remaining three-level covered bridge in the United States when it was destroyed on November 8, 2018, by the catastrophic Camp Fire.

The Colman Museum, headquartered in Chico, California, is dedicated to preserving the history and beauty of the Butte Creek canyon. Whitewater kayaking on Butte Creek is popular, in part because of the outstanding scenery of the "Little Grand Canyon" section of the creek near Chico.

== See also ==
- List of rivers in California
