= Honey Run Covered Bridge =

- U.S. National Register of Historic Places
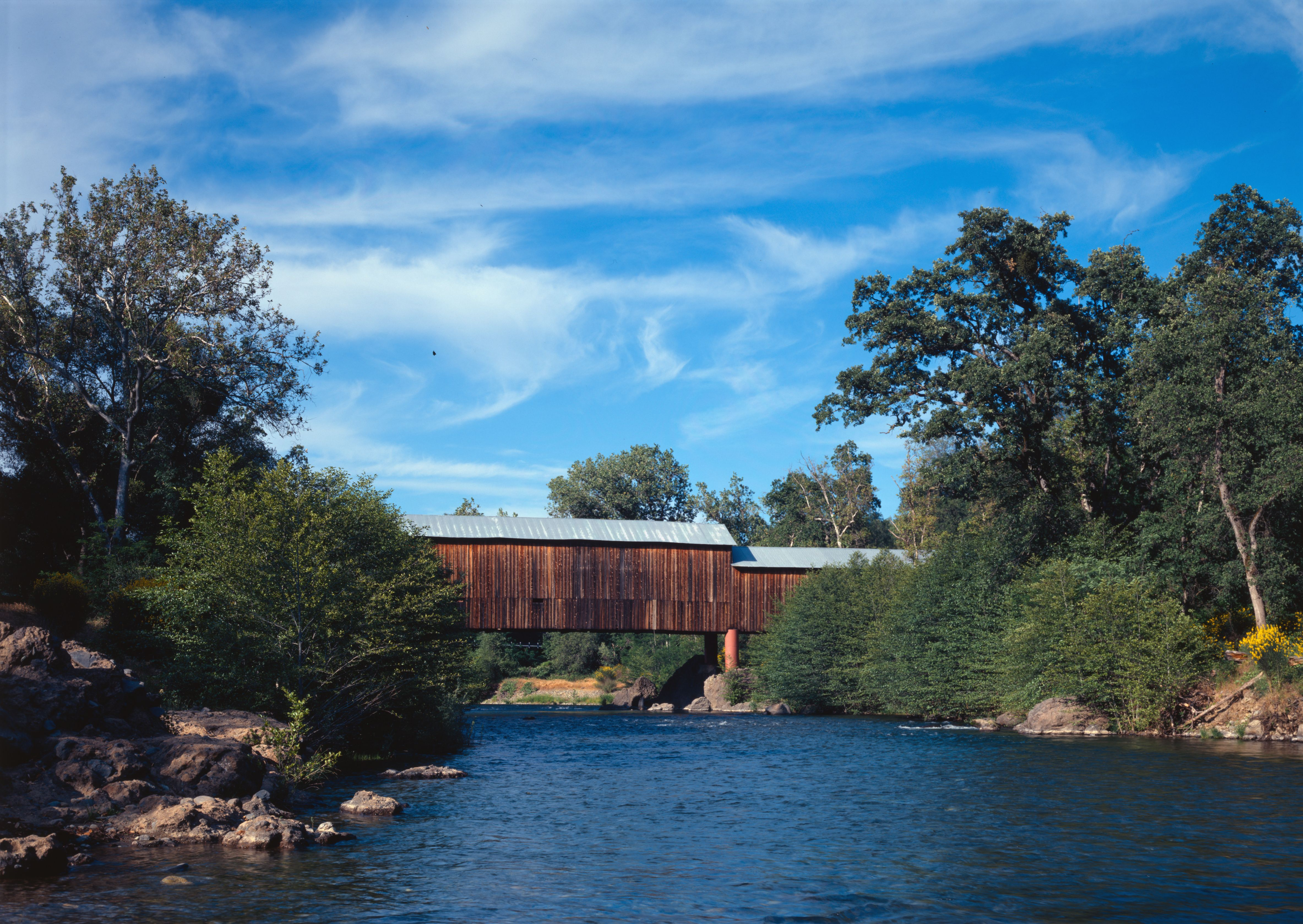
- A photo from the Historic American Engineering Record

- Location within California Location within the United States
- Location: Butte County, California
- Nearest city: Chico, California
- Coordinates: 39°43′43″N 121°42′13″W
- Built: 1886
- Architect: American Bridge and Building Company of San Francisco
- Demolished: 2018
- Restored: 2022 - 2025
- Restored by: Honey Run Covered Bridge Association (HRCBA)
- NRHP reference No.: 88000920
- Added to NRHP: June 23, 1988

The Honey Run Covered Bridge is a wooden covered bridge spanning Butte Creek in Butte County, California, United States. Built in 1886 by the American Bridge and Building Company of San Francisco, the bridge was located on Honey Run Road at Centerville Road, midway between Chico and Paradise.

The bridge was a rare example of a three-span Pratt truss covered bridge and was added to the National Register of Historic Places on June 23, 1988. It was the last of its kind in the United States until it was destroyed in the Camp Fire on November 8, 2018.

The Honey Run Covered Bridge spans Butte Creek near Chico, California, U.S.A. (2025).

Efforts to restore the bridge have been led by the Honey Run Covered Bridge Association (HRCBA), with plans for reconstruction beginning in 2022. The rebuilding of the bridge was completed in early 2025, with a grand opening ceremony on June 1, 2025.

== History ==
Built in 1886 and accepted as completed by the Butte County Board of Supervisors on January 3, 1887, the Honey Run Bridge (originally known as Carr Hill Bridge) was constructed by the American Bridge and Building Company of San Francisco. George Miller was appointed Superintendent of Construction by Butte County to oversee the project.

The three-span wooden bridge was initially built uncovered. This is evident from the timber trusses of the two original remaining spans, which were later covered with sheet metal on three sides. The bridge was fully covered in 1901 to protect its structure.

Crossing Butte Creek, the Honey Run Bridge was the only surviving example of a three-span timber Pratt-type covered bridge in the United States. Its historical significance earned it a place on the National Register of Historic Places in 1988.

The bridge remained open to vehicular traffic until 1965, when a truck crashed into the eastern span, causing significant damage that rendered it virtually impassable. A new steel bridge was subsequently built upstream to accommodate vehicles.

After the accident, the Honey Run Bridge was converted into a pedestrian footbridge and preserved within Honey Run Covered Bridge County Park. Local residents raised funds to rebuild the eastern span from its ruins, and the bridge re-opened in 1972.

The bridge was destroyed by the Camp Fire on November 8, 2018. Plans for restoring the bridge were immediately undertaken by local residents and the HRCBA. In 2020, the HRCBA assumed full ownership of the bridge and the right-of-way over Butte Creek. On July 1, 2025, the bridge was officially reopened to the public, along with the rest of the county park and a new caretaker cottage.

The restored bridge retains its original construction and appearance with the exception of safety upgrades. The Historic American Engineering Record (HAER) also retains documentation of the bridge's original construction.

== Gallery ==
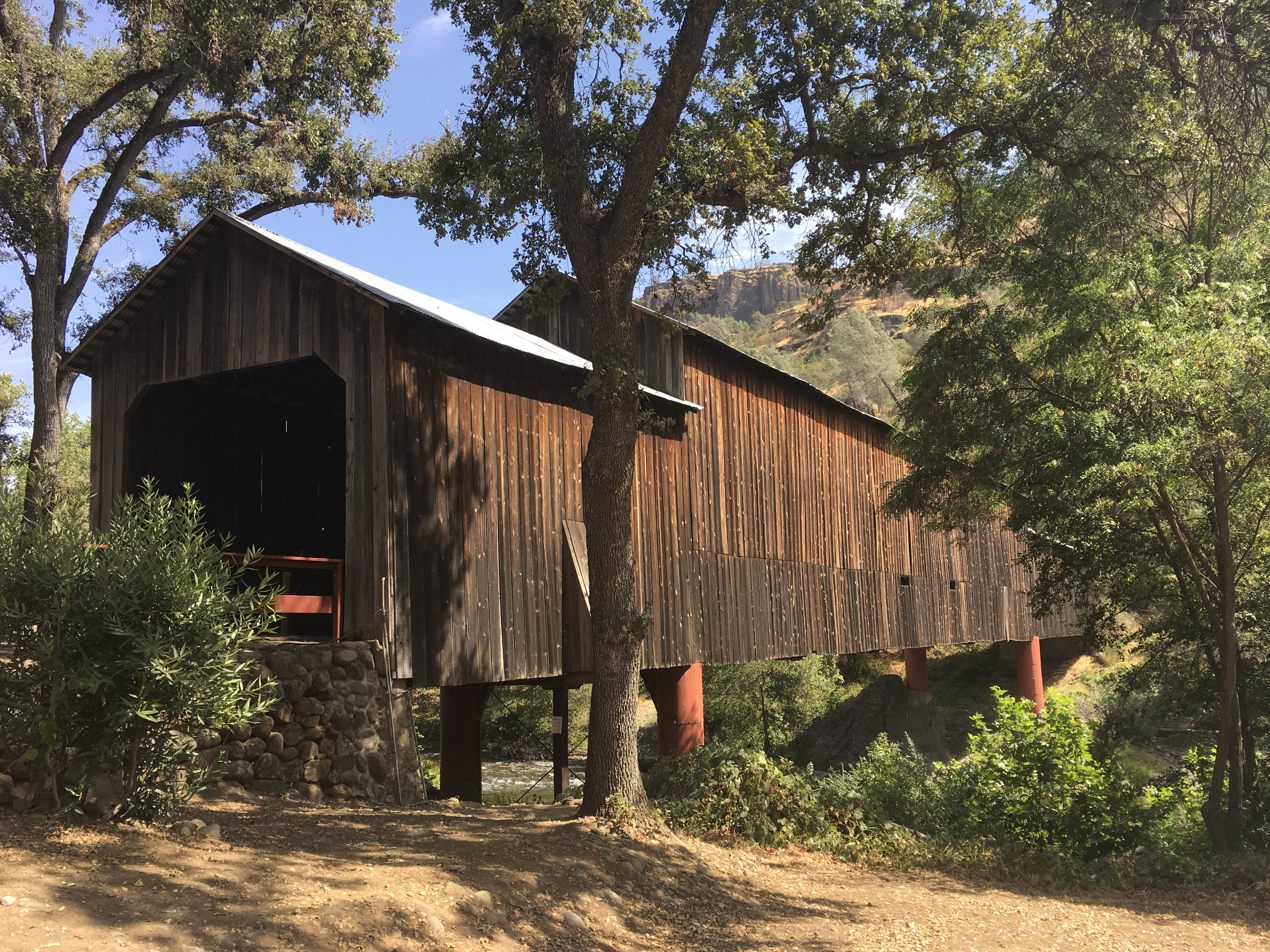
The bridge as seen fourteen months prior to being destroyed by the Camp Fire

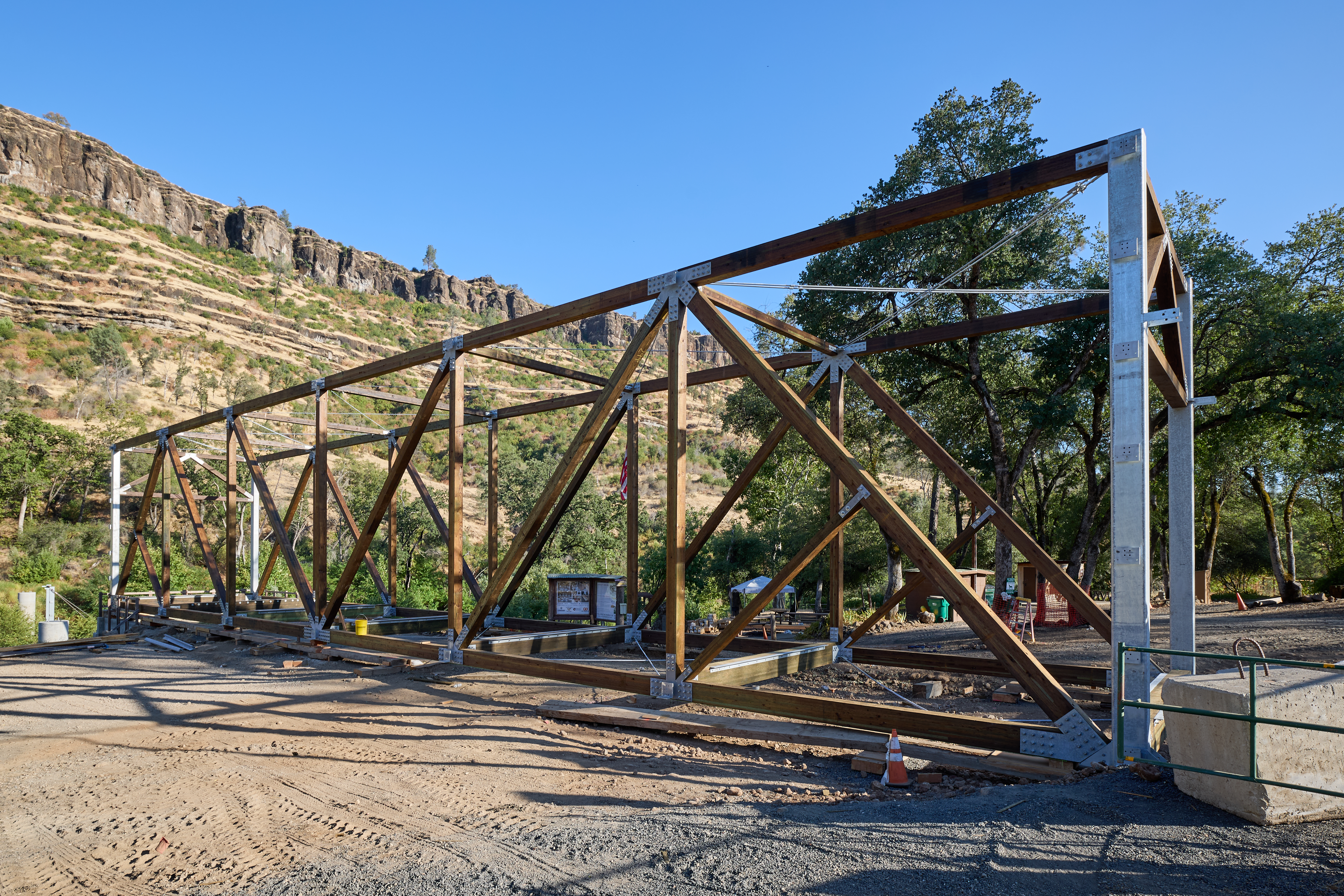
View of the construction site during the rebuild in July 2024

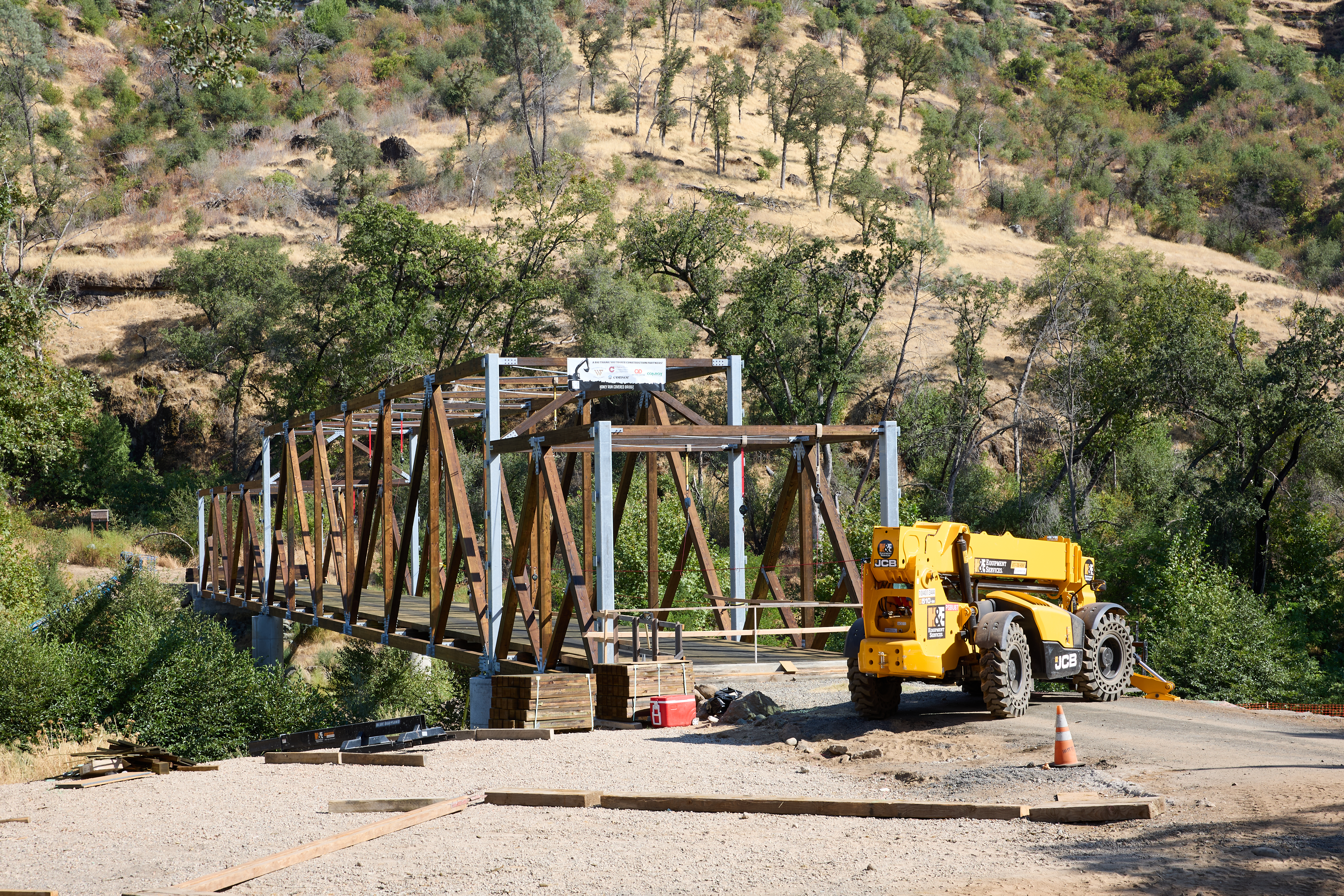
View of the construction site during the rebuild in August 2024

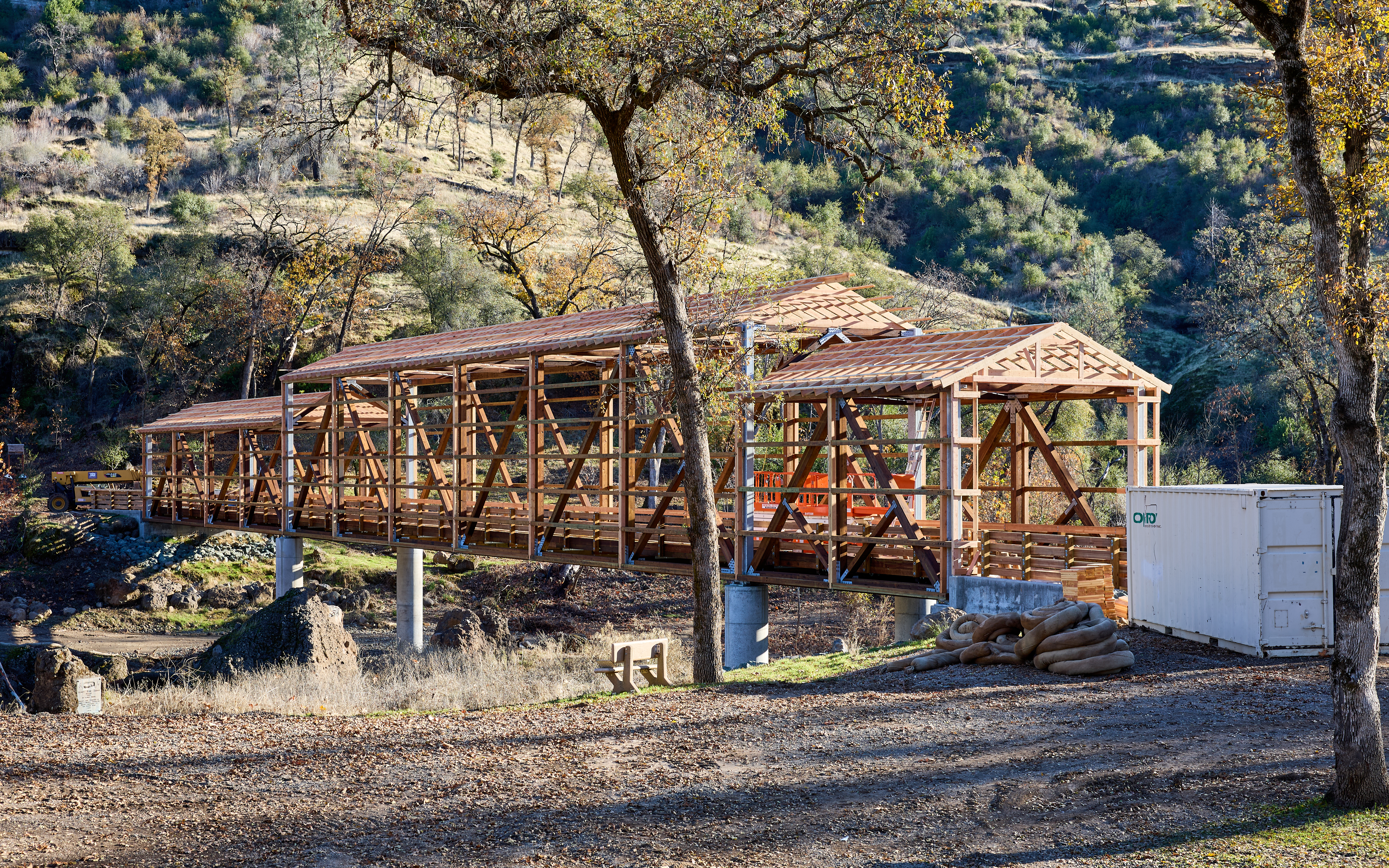
View of the construction site during the rebuild in December 2024

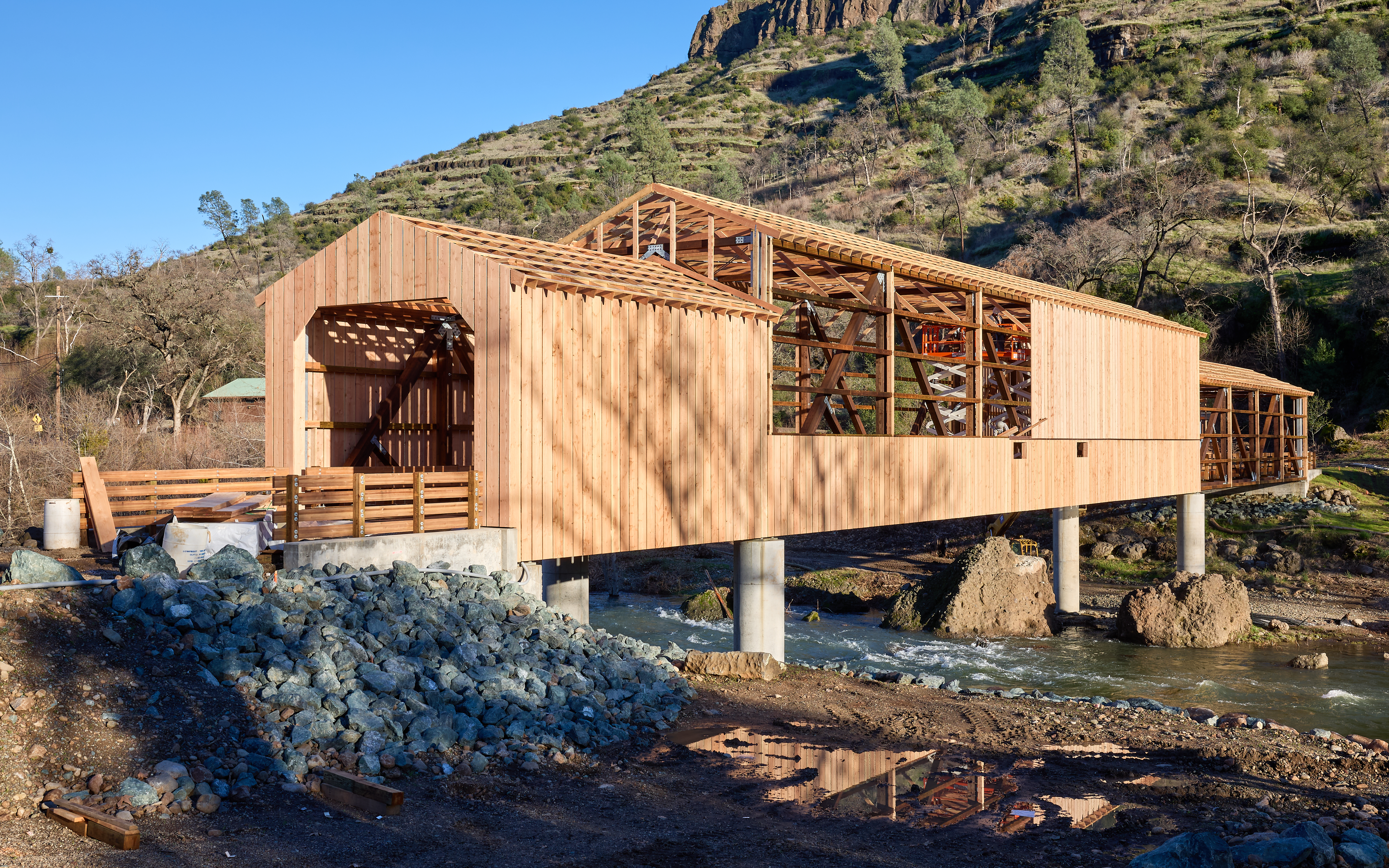
View of the construction site shortly before completion of the project, end of December 2024

The Honey Run Covered Bridge spans Butte Creek near Chico, California, U.S.A. (2025).(2)

== See also ==
- List of bridges documented by the Historic American Engineering Record in California
- National Register of Historic Places listings in Butte County, California
