= Sierra Buttes =

Mountain of the Sierra Nevada in California, United States

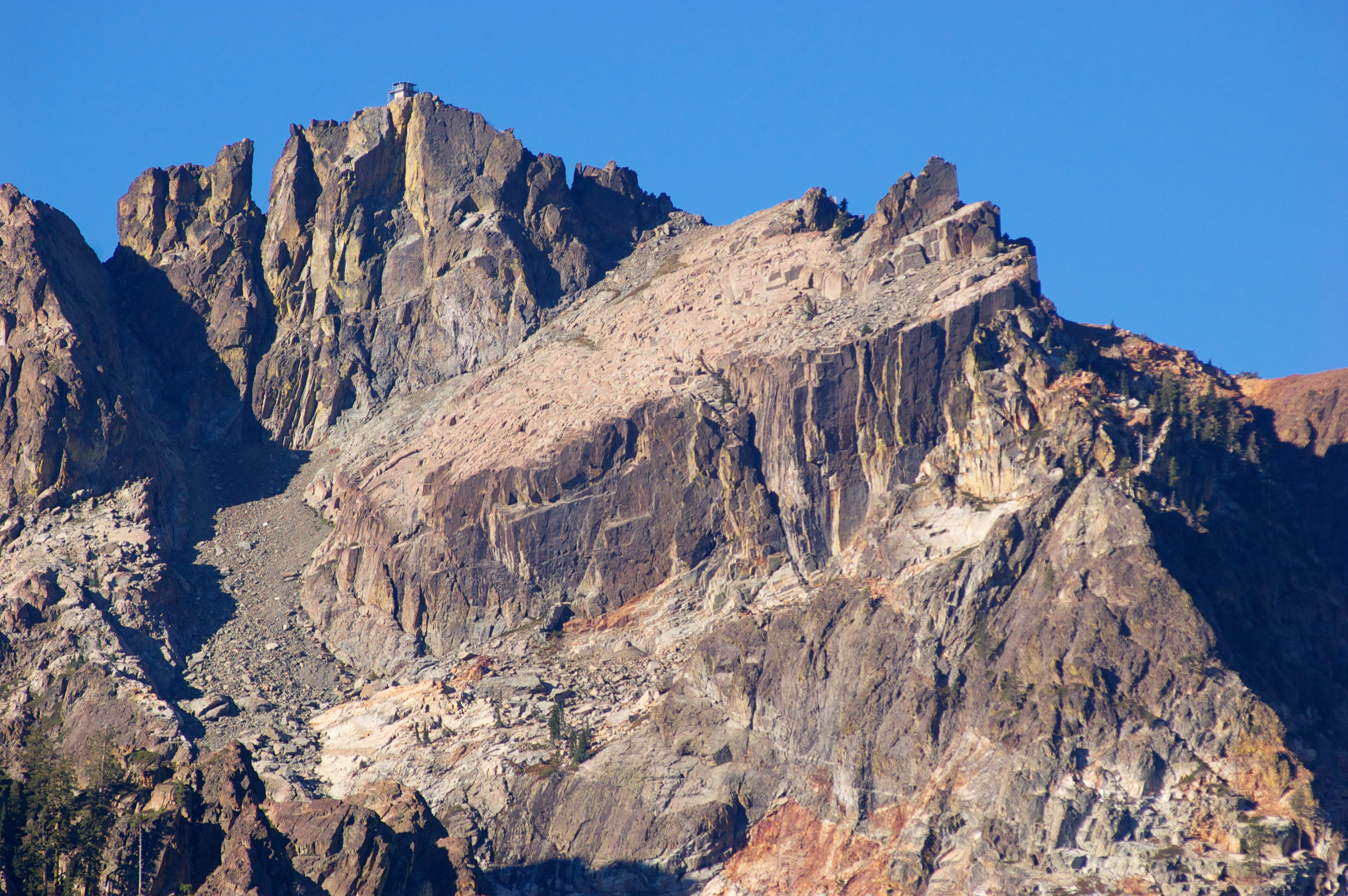
- Northeast aspect. Lookout visible at summit.

Highest point
- Elevation: 8,591 ft (2,619 m)
- Prominence: 1,870 ft (570 m)
- Parent peak: Peak 8740
- Isolation: 17.81 mi (28.66 km)
- Listing: Sierra Peaks Section
- Coordinates: 39°35′37″N 120°38′49″W

Geography
- Location within California Location within the United States
- Location: Sierra County, California, U.S.
- Parent range: Sierra Nevada
- Topo map: USGS Sierra City

Geology
- Rock age: Devonian
- Rock type: Metavolcanic rock

Climbing
- Easiest route: Hiking trail + stairs

Sierra Buttes is an 8,591-foot-elevation (2,619-meter) mountain summit located in the Sierra Nevada mountain range in Sierra County, California, United States. It is the third-highest point in Sierra County following the north ridge of Mount Lola and Peak 8740. Sierra Buttes are set on land managed by Tahoe National Forest and are within the North Yuba River watershed. The summit is situated two miles (3.2 km) north of Sierra City, and approximately 70 miles (110 km) northeast of Sacramento. Topographic relief is significant as the southwest aspect rises nearly 4,700 feet (1,400 meters) above the Yuba–Donner Scenic Byway in approximately two miles. The prominent fortress-like landform is visible from as far as the Sacramento Valley, and inclusion on the Sierra Peaks Section peakbagging list generates climbing interest. This landform's toponym has been officially adopted by the U.S. Board on Geographic Names, and has been in use since at least 1896 when published by the Sierra Club.

== Lookout ==
A fire lookout tower that was originally built in 1915 tops the highest point on Sierra Buttes. In 1964, employees of the National Forest Service erected metal stairs with railings for the public to safely access the views from the lookout. The hike to the lookout is one of the most popular destinations in the northern Sierra region. The Sierra Buttes trail is 2.3 miles long, gains 1,587 feet of elevation, and one mile of it is shared with the Pacific Crest Trail. In good weather, Lassen Peak can be seen from the lookout, 65 miles to the northwest, as well as Mount Shasta 150 miles distant. Sierra Valley can be seen to the east.

== Climate ==
According to the Köppen climate classification system, Sierra Buttes is located in an alpine climate zone. Most weather fronts originate in the Pacific Ocean before traveling east toward the Sierra Nevada mountains. As fronts approach, they are forced upward by the peaks (orographic lift), causing them to drop their moisture in the form of rain or snowfall onto the range.

== Geology ==
The Sierra Buttes are composed of metavolcanic rock, predominantly andesitic hydroclastic breccia and peperite which intruded the Sierra Buttes Formation. The rock is part of the Northern Sierra Terrane and was formed in an undersea volcanic process along an island arc during the late Devonian period. Gold nuggets were discovered at mines surrounding the Sierra Buttes during the California Gold Rush, the largest being the Monumental Nugget which weighed 106 pounds was uncovered in 1869.

== Gallery ==
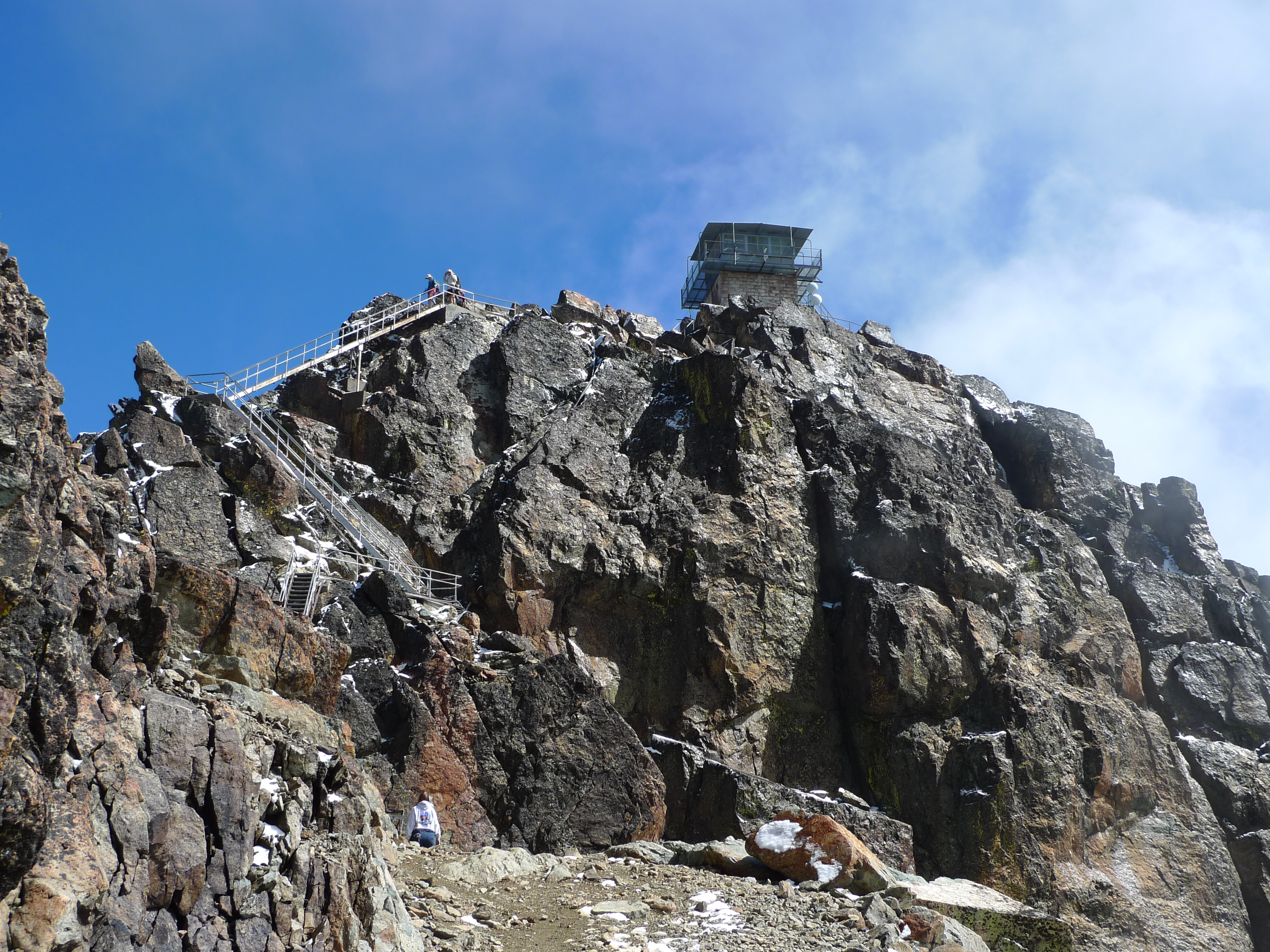
Sierra Buttes' fire lookout and metal stairs

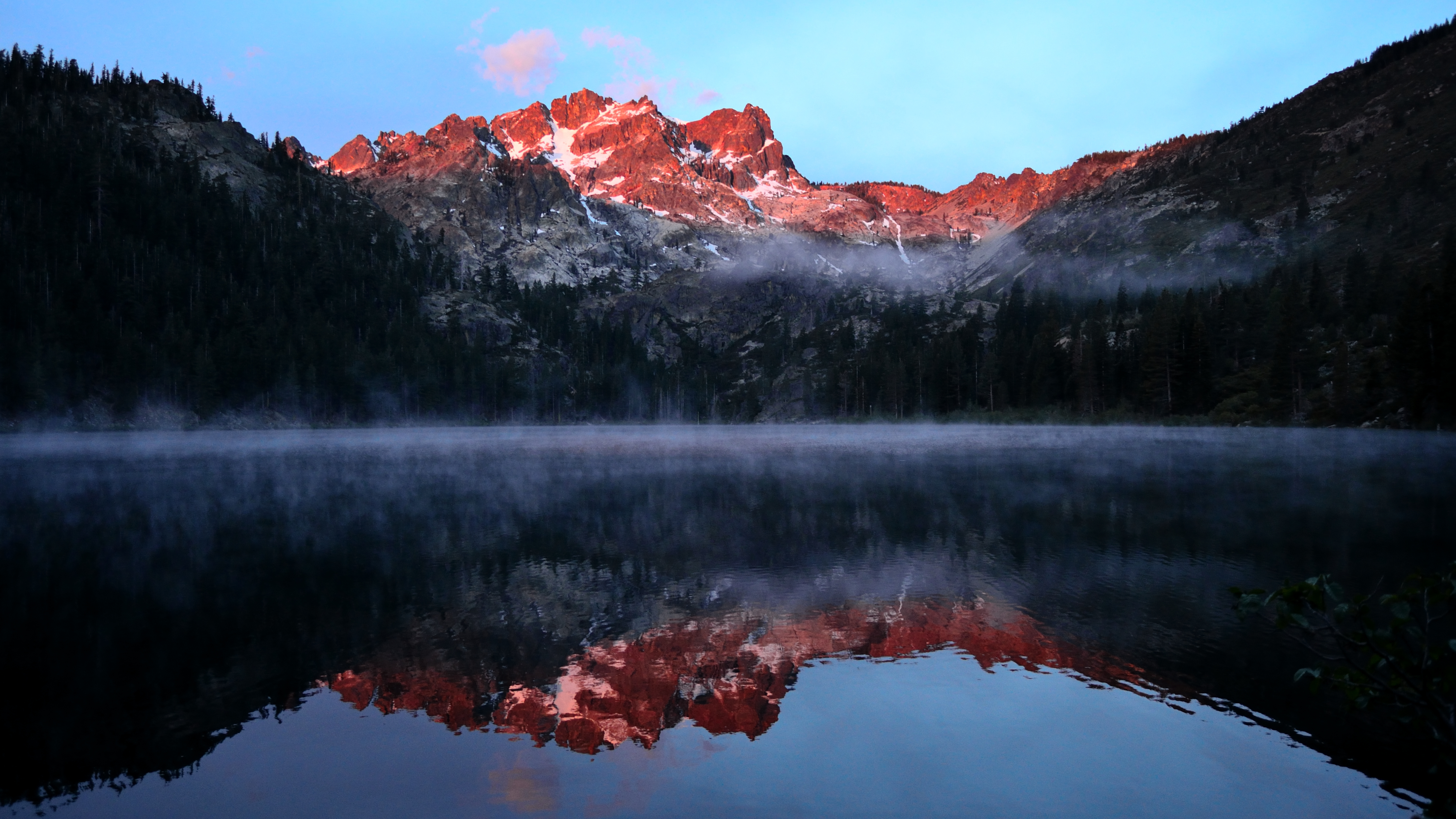
Sierra Buttes reflected in Sardine Lake at sunrise

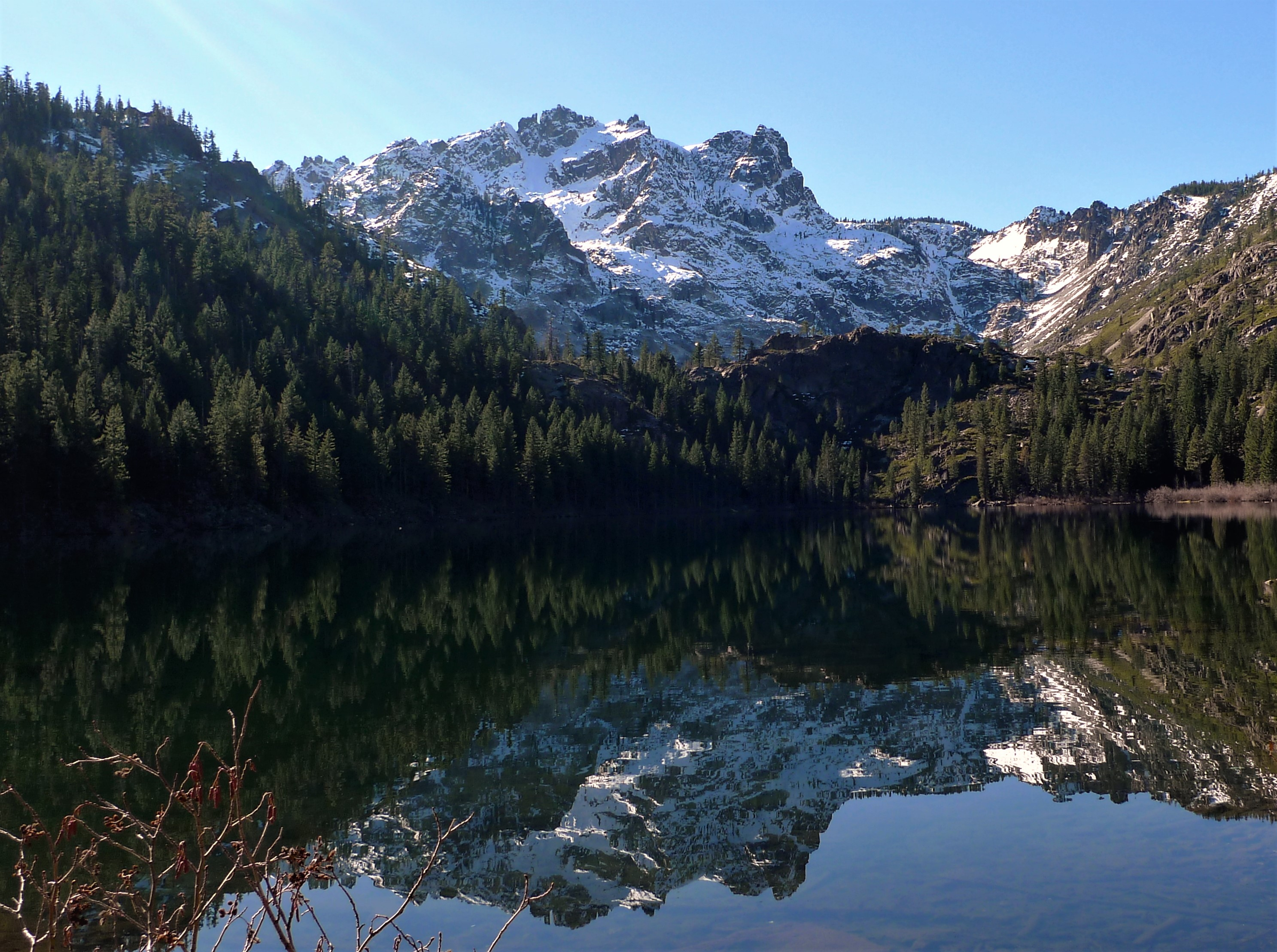
Sierra Buttes in late November

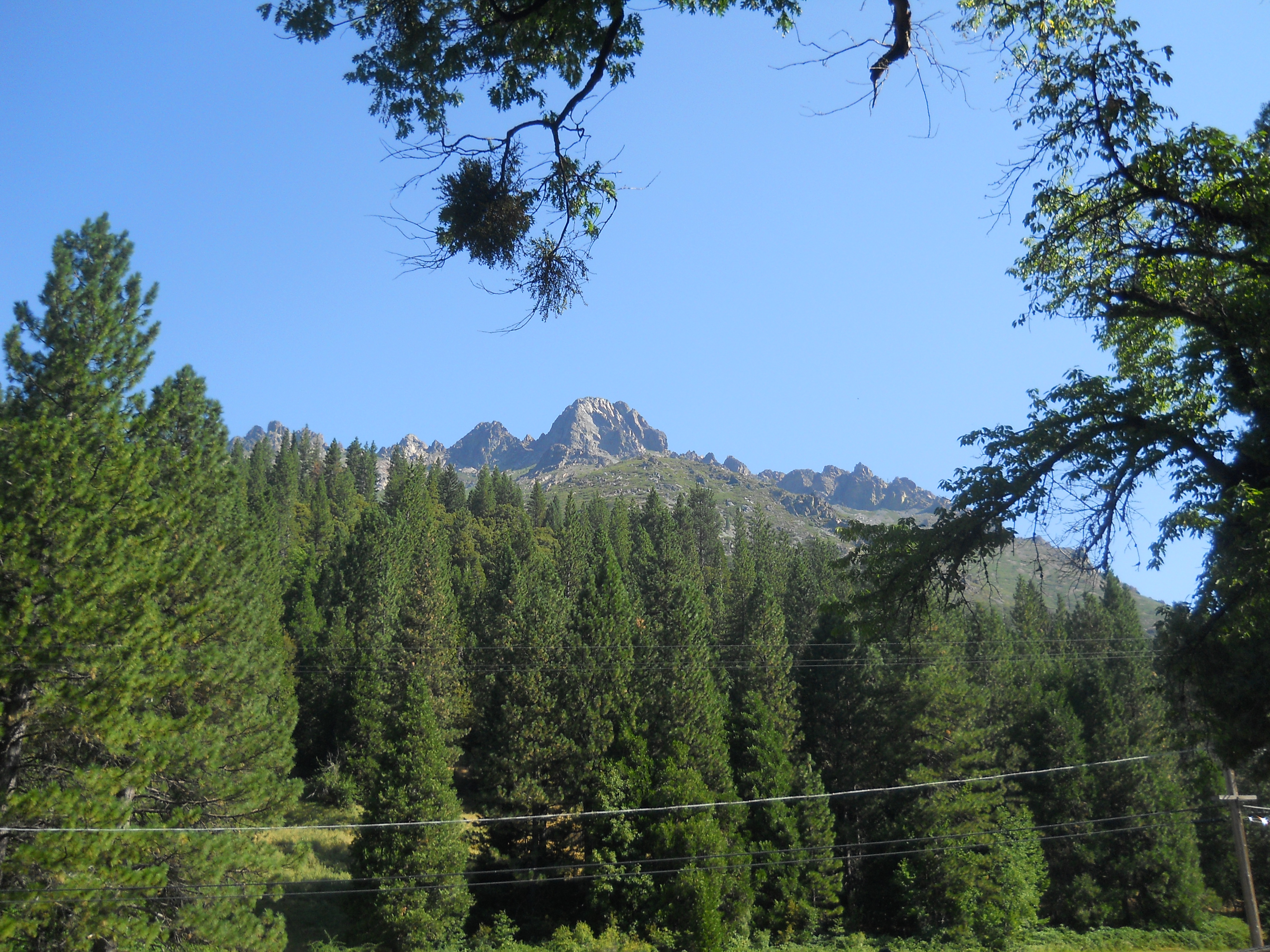
South aspect from Sierra City

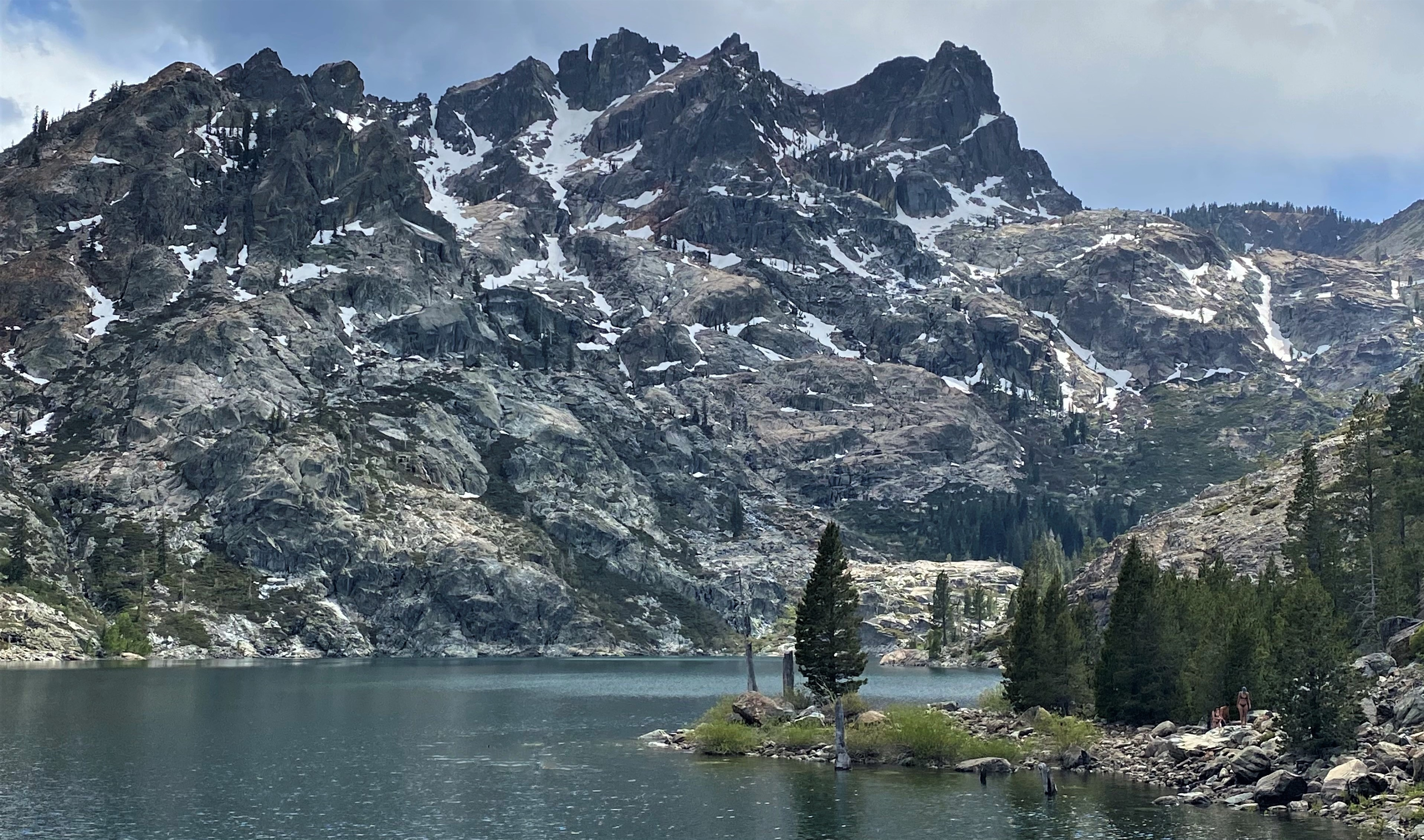
Upper Sardine Lake and Sierra Buttes

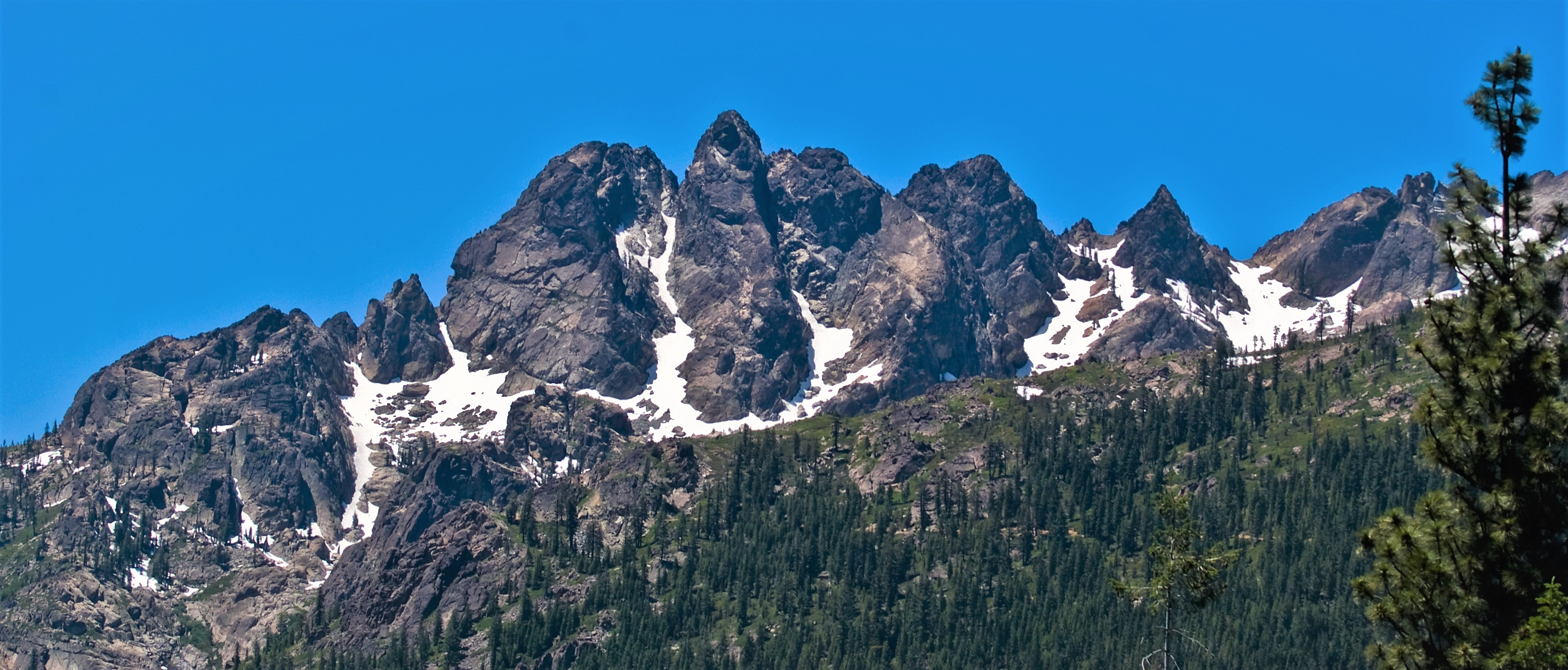
North aspect of Sierra Buttes seen from Gold Lake Highway

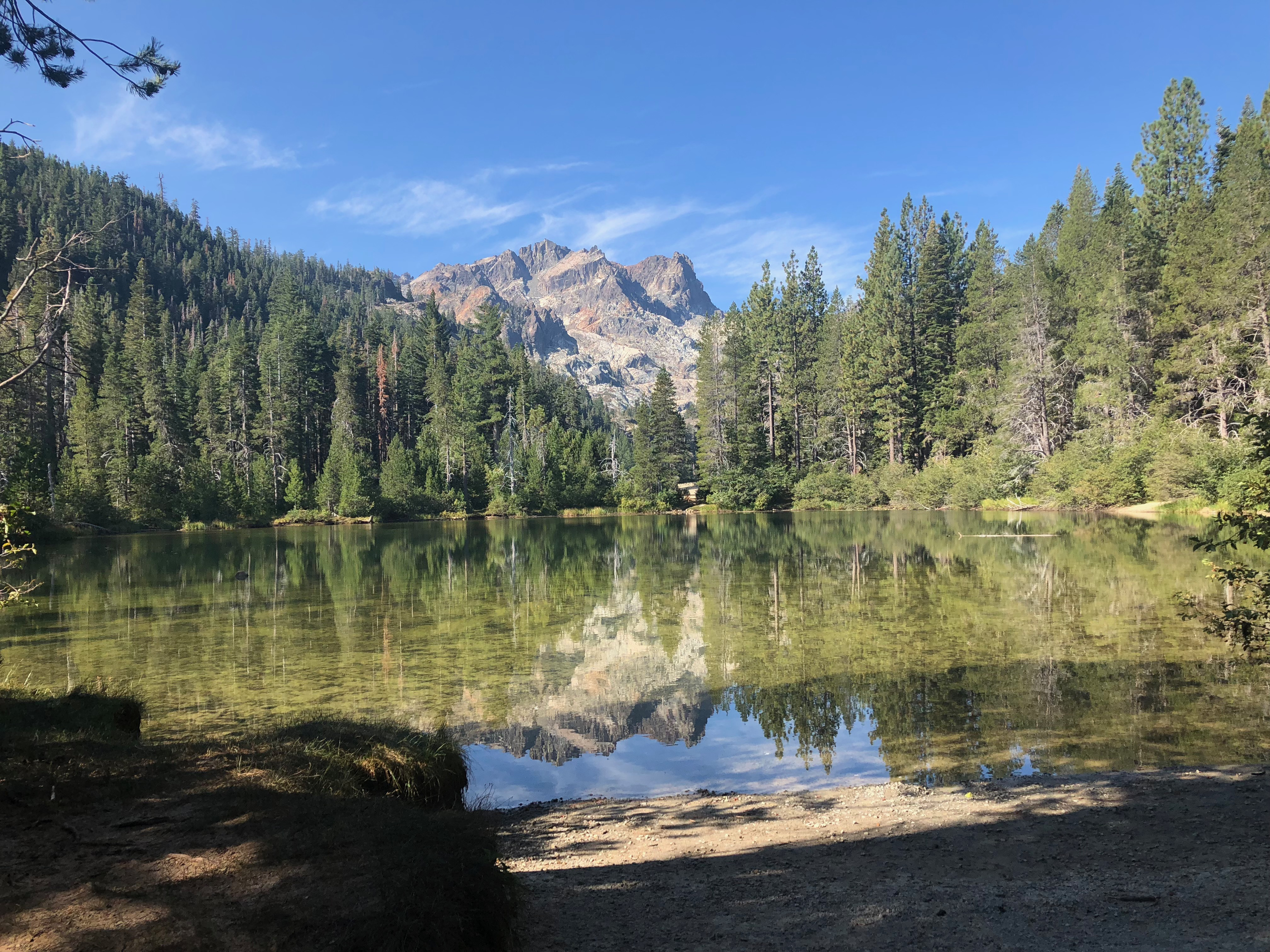

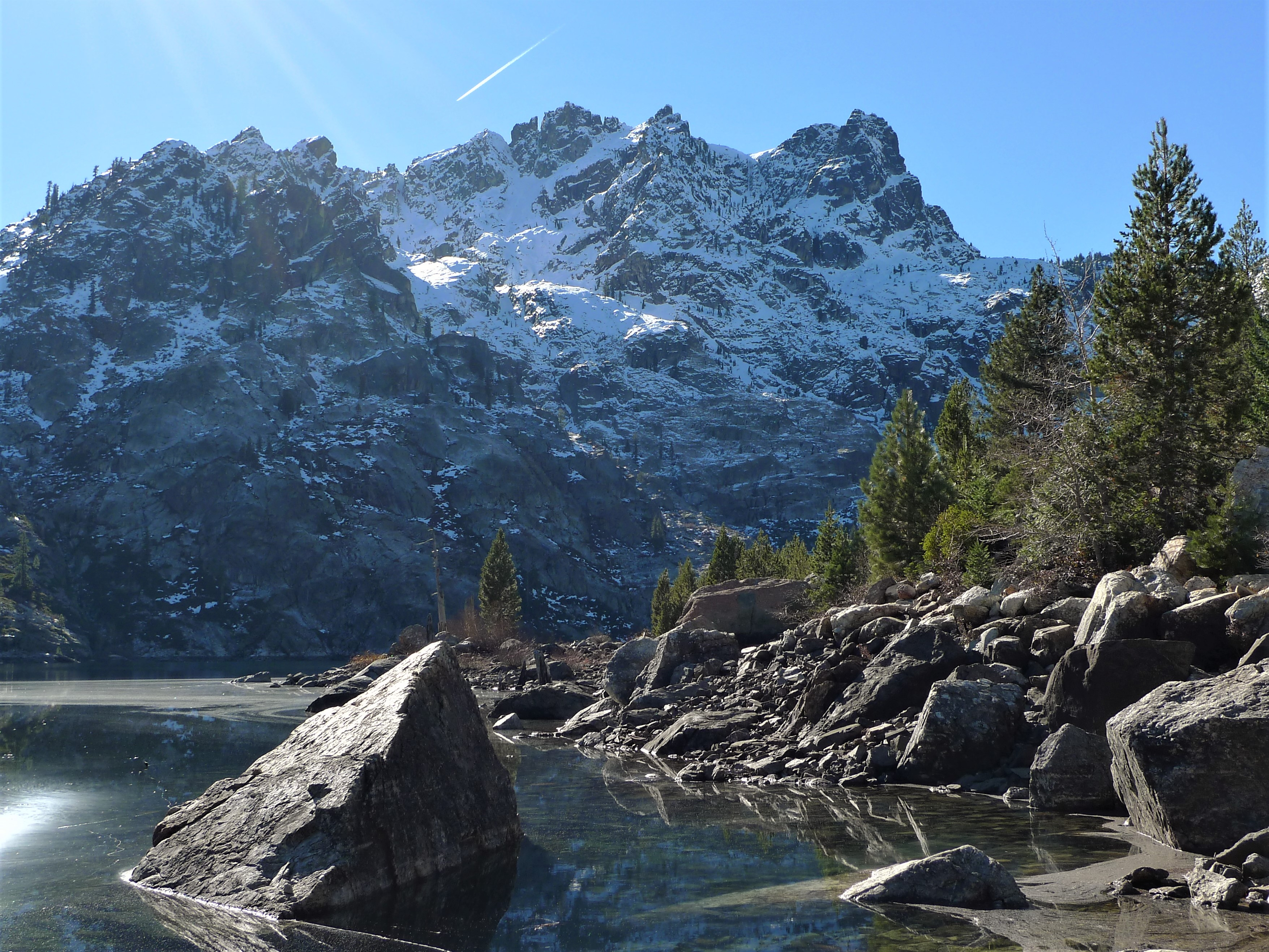

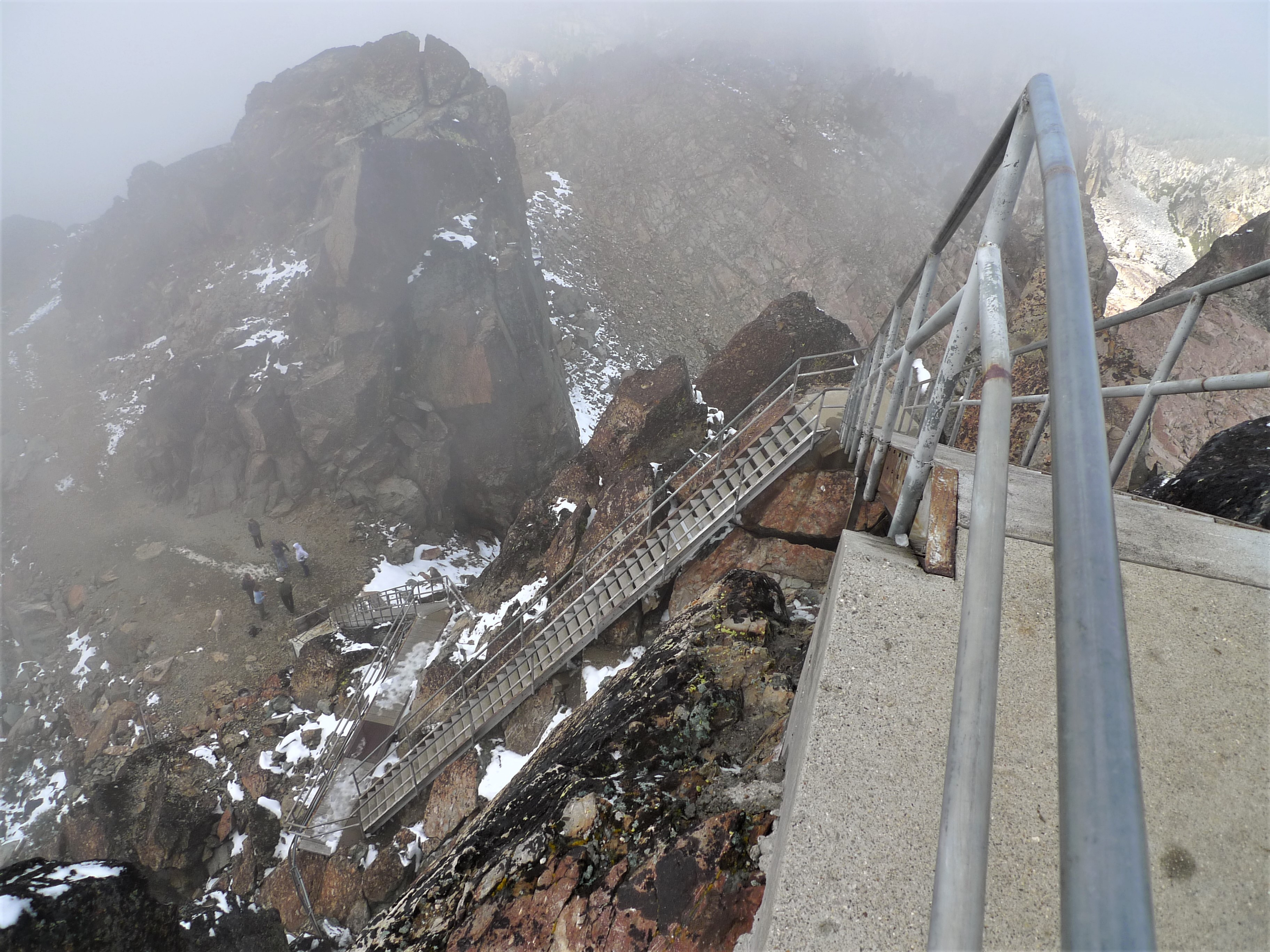
Looking down the stairs of Sierra Buttes

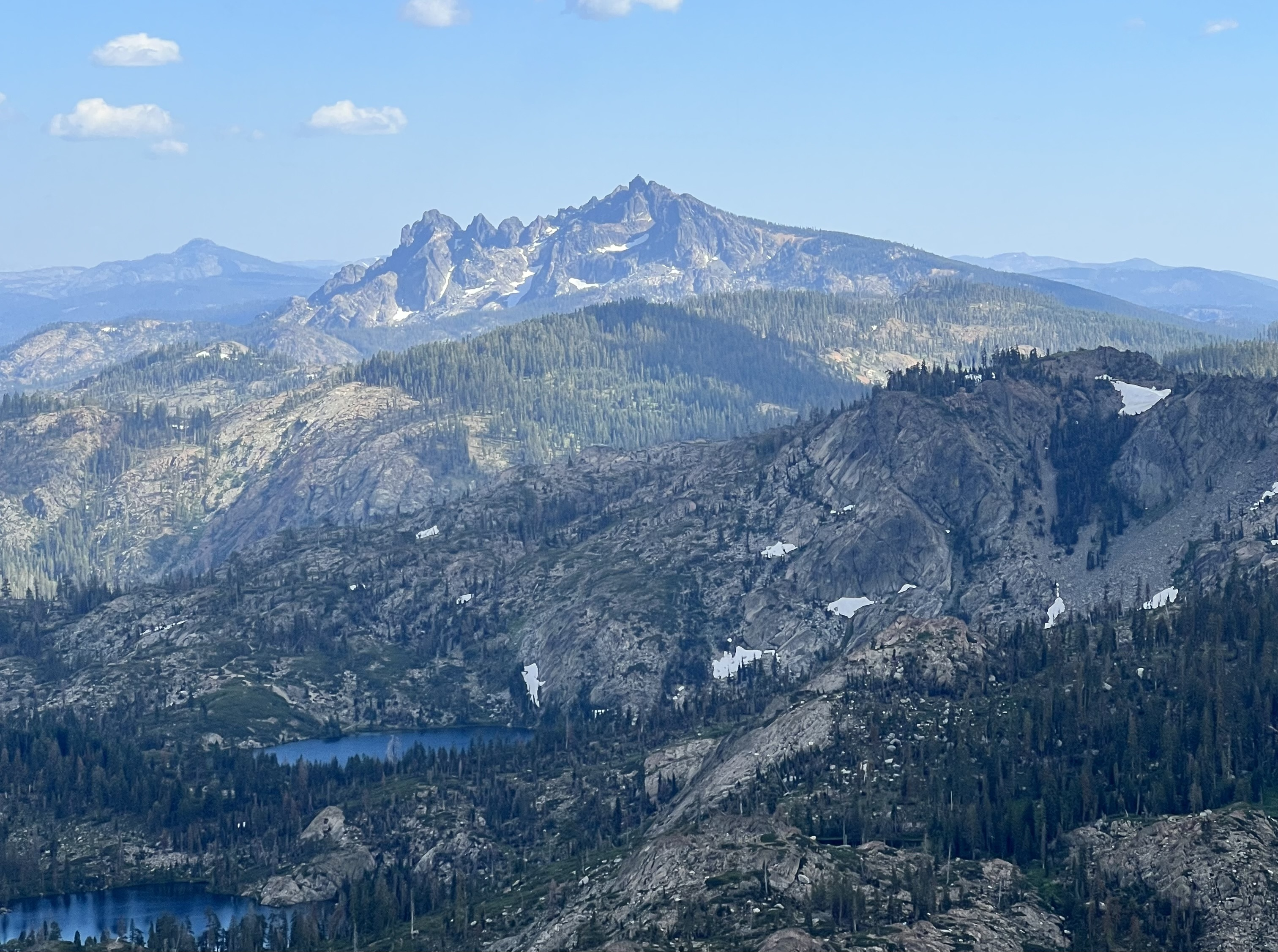
North aspect from afar
