= Inskip, California =

- Unincorporated community
- Location in California Inskip, California (the United States)
- Coordinates: 39°59′24″N 121°32′28″W
- Country: United States
- State: California
- County: Butte
- Elevation: 4,777 ft (1,456 m)

Inskip is a ghost town in Butte County, California, United States. It lies at an elevation of 4,777 feet (1,456 m) in the northern Sierra Nevada near Lassen National Forest. The main surviving building is the Inskip Hotel, which is listed on the National Register of Historic Places.

== History ==
Historical variants to the name suggest the community's history may have included mining. Variant names listed include Enskeeps Diggins and Inskip Town.

The town was named in 1857 for the discoverer of gold here, Mr. Enskeep.

A post office operated at Inskip from 1862 to 1915, with a brief interruption in 1873.

At the bottom of the ravine runs the West Branch of the Feather River. Inskip Pioneer Cemetery is located almost exactly 1-mile (1.6 km) due south of town on a hill overlooking the road. The cemetery is located at latitude/longitude 39°58′33″N 121°32′20″W.
