= Magalia Community Church =

Historic church in California, United States

- U.S. National Register of Historic Places
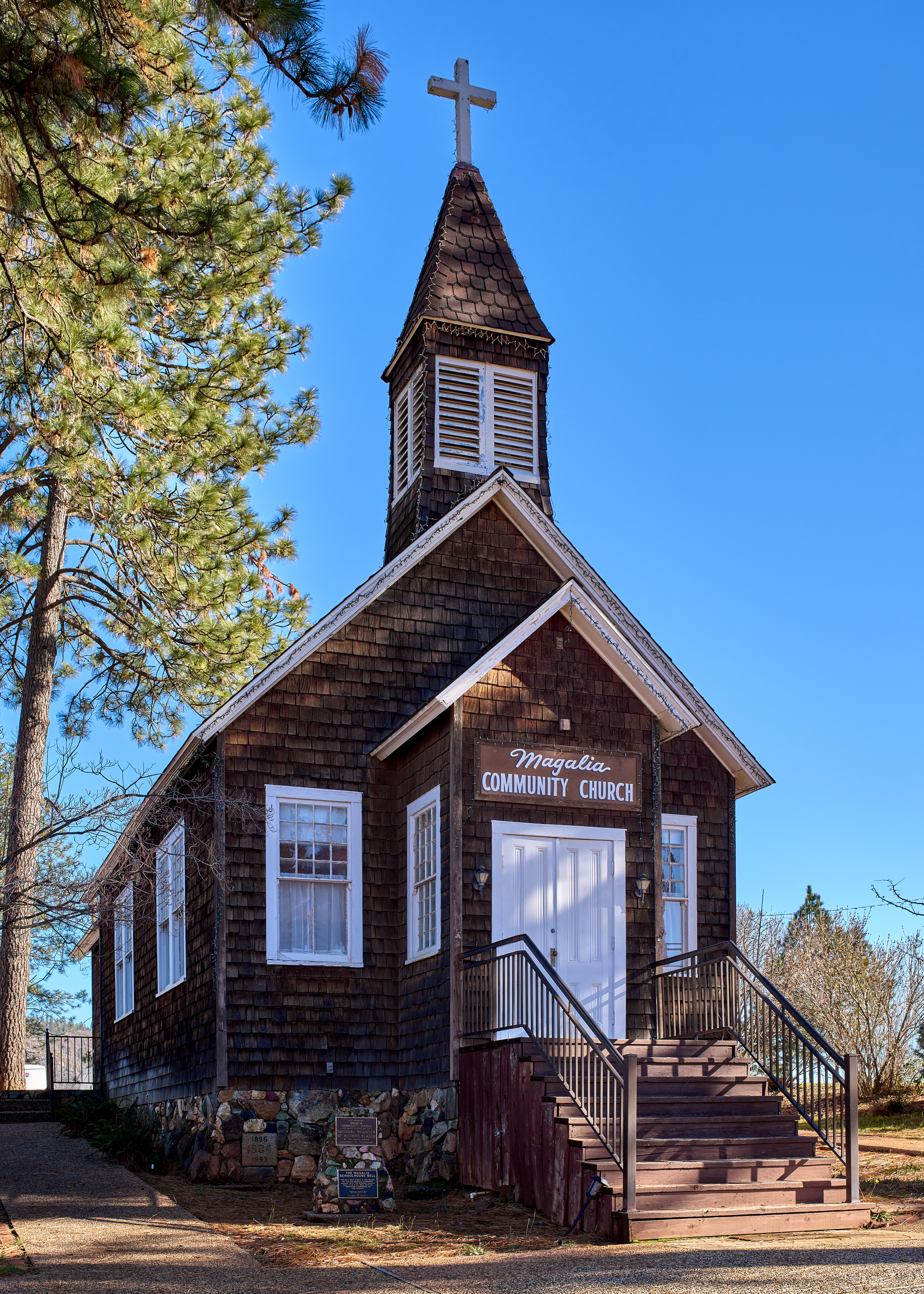
- Magalia Community Church (2024)

- Location within California Location within the United States
- Location: Stirling Hwy., Magalia, California
- Coordinates: 39°48′36″N 121°34′40″W
- Area: 0.1 acres (0.040 ha)
- Built: 1904
- Built by: Albert Samuel Parsons (original); Carrie Brydon (1904 reconstruction)
- NRHP reference No.: 82002172
- Added to NRHP: January 11, 1982

Magalia Community Church is a historic church located on Stirling Highway in Magalia, California, United States. Construction of the church began in 1850 but was left incomplete, resulting in only the floor and 4 walls. Completion of the church was not accomplished until 1904. It was added to the National Register of Historic Places in 1982.

== History ==
It is estimated that around 1850, a Christian minister, Albert Samuel Parsons, came from Cherokee, Butte County and started building a church. It is uncertain why he eventually abandoned the project, but he left the structure incomplete, only leaving a foundation, a floor and four walls (including the windows that exist to this day).

In 1900, Parsons moved away from Magalia and local interest in the church waned. At this point, the property's owner, George McLean, asked that the partially completed church be removed from the grounds. However, Carrie Brydon (purportedly a staunch supporter of the temperance movement) arrived in Magalia from Canada, came across the partially completed church, and was granted permission to have it moved to a location near the intersection of Old Skyway Road and Glover Lane.

With the philanthropic assistance of Annie Bidwell (also see Bidwell Mansion) and the local Crew family, Brydon raised $600 to have the church dismantled and then rebuilt to the same specifications. With the money raised, they were also able to finish the interior and add a vestibule, a belfry, a steeple and a small kitchen. Sometime later, the kitchen area was made part of the church proper to make room for a pulpit, an organ and a piano. The bell and organ were purchased by Bidwell at that time for $50. The completed building was finally dedicated on Easter Sunday, 1904.

During its history, it appears that the structure was moved three different times but there are varying accounts of the exact locations. Sources indicate that it might at one time have been located close to Whiskey Flat (Paradise East), California(a.k.a. Whiskey Flats), at another location near the juncture of Coutolenc Road and Old Skyway Road, and perhaps also at yet another location in Magalia between Nimshew Road and the Magalia Reservoir.

In 1993, the small church made a final journey to its present-day location on Stirling Highway in Magalia. The church was dedicated as a historical site on Aug 21, 1982, and the Magalia community continues to support the ongoing cost of restoring and preserving the chapel. To this day, the original church bell rings every Sunday morning to signal the start of church services.

== Gallery ==
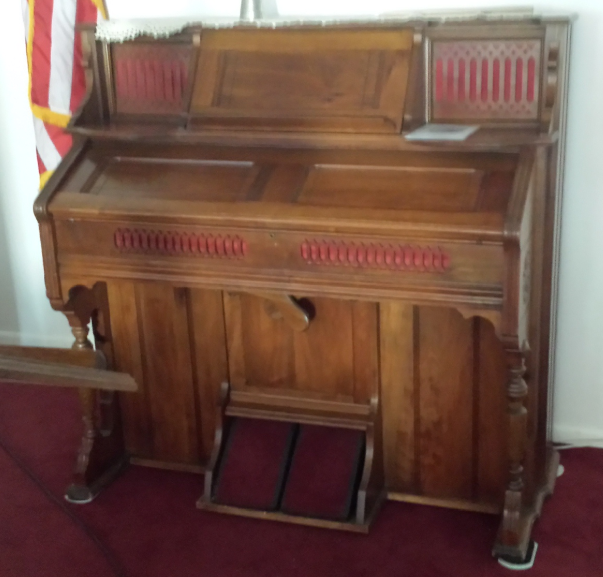
Organ donated by Annie Bidwell

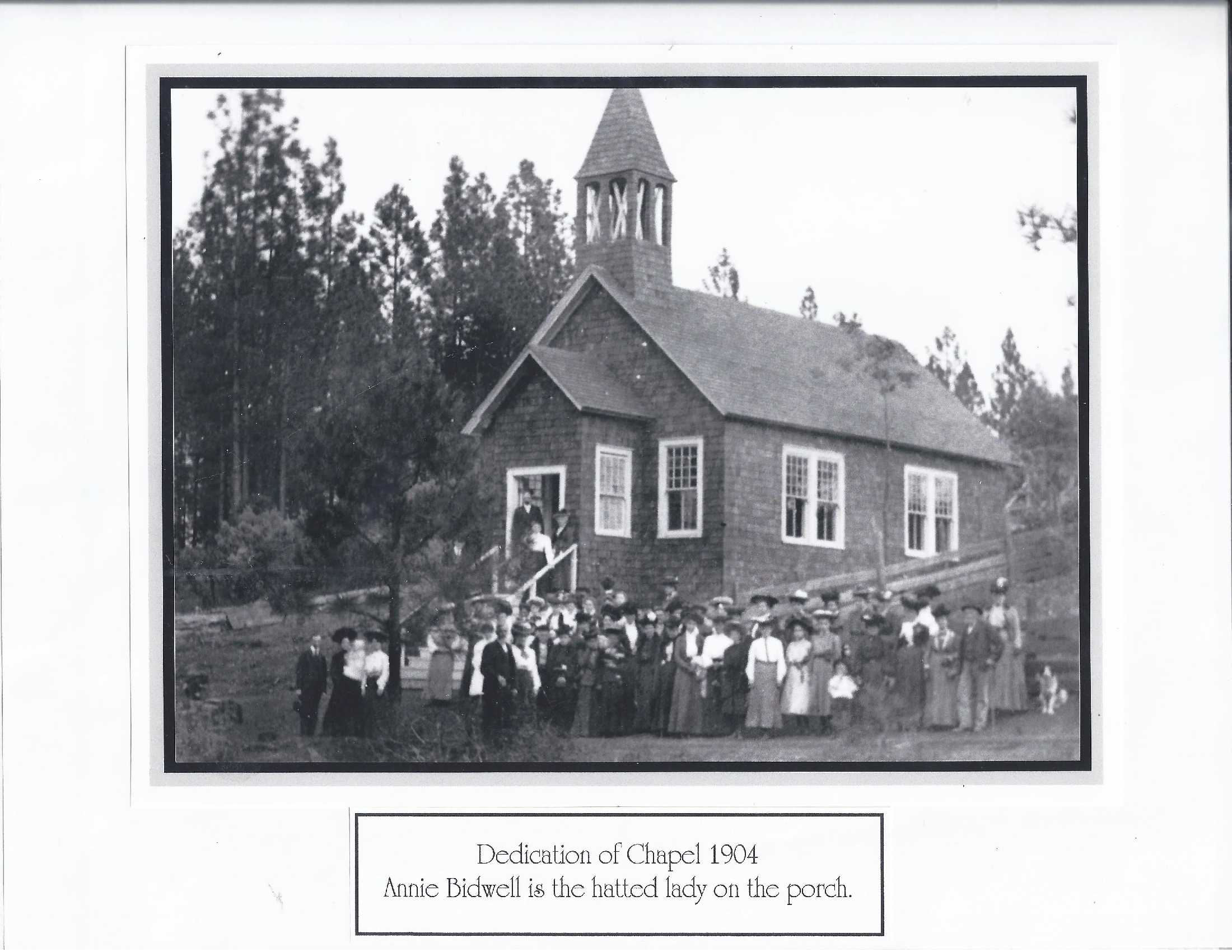
Magalia Community Church c1904

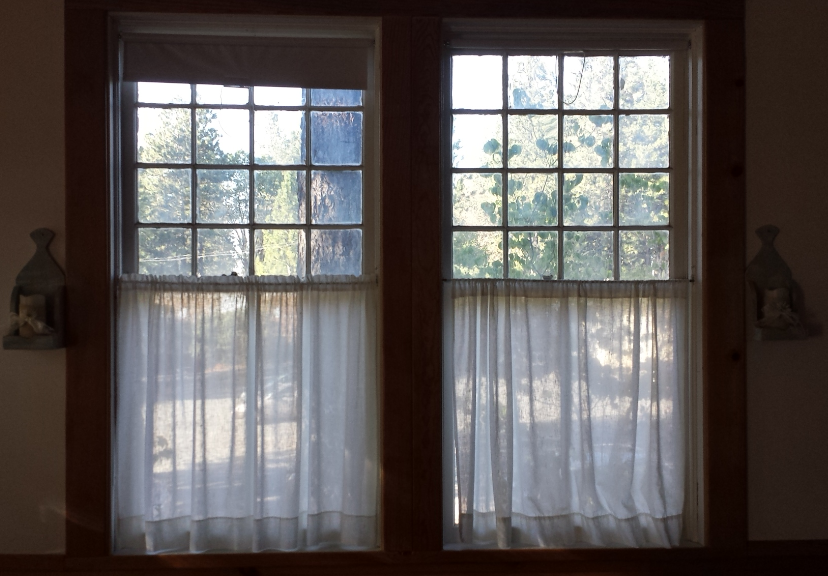
Original church windows

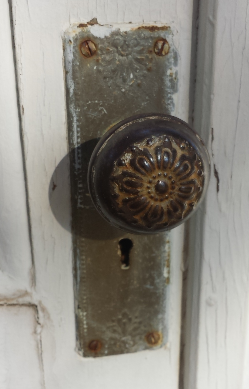
Original doorknob - church entrance
