= Chico Midtown Station =

United States historic post office

- U.S. National Register of Historic Places
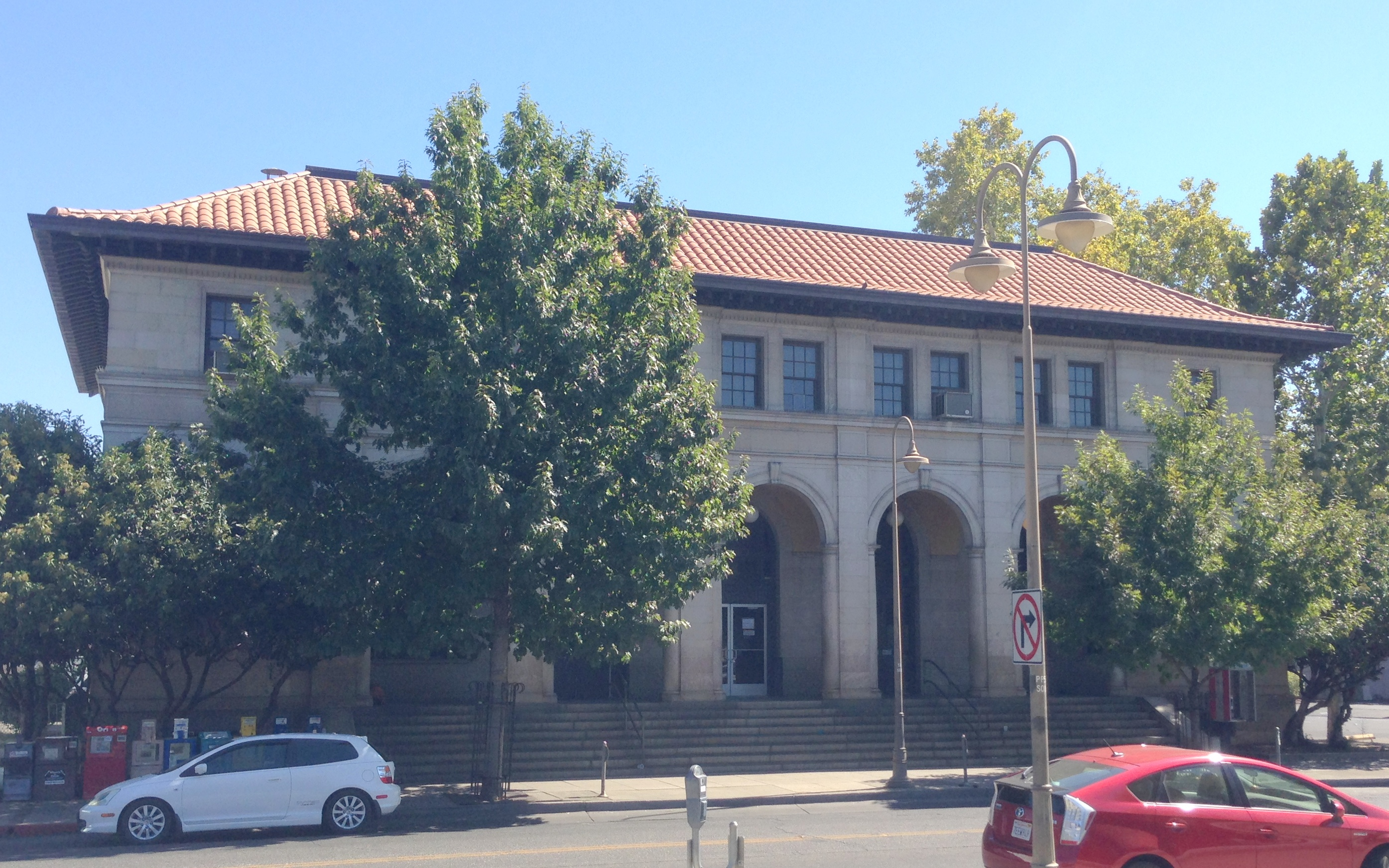
- Chico Midtown Station
- Location: 141 West Fifth Street, Chico, California
- Coordinates: 39.72768°N 121.83855°W
- Built: 1914
- Architect: J.W. Roberts and Oscar Wenderoth
- Architectural style: Renaissance Revival
- NRHP reference No.: 85000122

The Chico Midtown Station (more commonly known as the Downtown Chico Post Office) is a United States Postal Service post office in downtown Chico, California.

The building is listed on the National Register of Historic Places. It was designed in Renaissance Revival style by J.W. Roberts and Oscar Wenderoth.

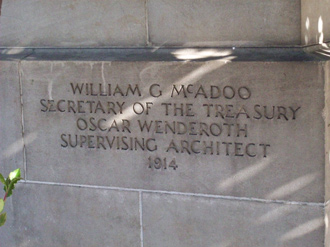
Architect's inscription

== See also ==
- National Register of Historic Places listings in Butte County, California
- List of United States post offices
