= Monumental Nugget =

Gold nugget found in California in 1869

Kentucky Mine & Museum, Sierra City

The Monumental Nugget is a large alluvial gold discovery. The gold nugget was found in 1869 in the state of California in the northern Sierra Nevada Mountains in the United States and ranks among the largest individual gold nugget discoveries in the world to date, as well as being the largest nugget ever discovered in the United States.

== Discovery ==
The Monumental Nugget was found just below the surface and weighed approximately 106.1-109,2 lb, (48.1-49,5 kg) and approx. 1,593 troy ounces). The dimensions of the entire nugget were approximately 60 x 60 cm; the Monumental Nugget was the largest gold nugget ever found in North America, surpassing the "Dogtown Nugget" discovered in 1859 and only a few months after the "Welcome Stranger" nugget in Australia.

== History ==
The Monumental Nugget was found in August 1869 in the Sierra Buttes mountain area north of Downieville in Sierra County approximately 120 km west of Reno and 150 km northeast of Sacramento, in central California by the five gold miners F. N. L. Clevering, W. A. Farish, Harry Warne, James Winstead, and A. Wood, at the Sierra Buttes Mine. The group discovered the nugget by chance after an earlier rainfall had exposed the nuggets top.

Shortly after the discovery, the nugget was sold to hotel owner Robert Blinn Woodward (1824–1879, founder of the Woodward's Gardens) in San Francisco for US$ 13,500. Woodward subsequently exhibited the nugget at several of his various hotels.

Around 1889, the nugget was sold to a goldsmith in New York, where it was melted down.

A replica of the gold nugget can be found on display at the Kentucky Mine Museum in Sierra City.
