= Meridian, Humboldt County, California =

Human settlement in the United States

Coordinates: 40°34′53.62″N 124°17′1.3″W

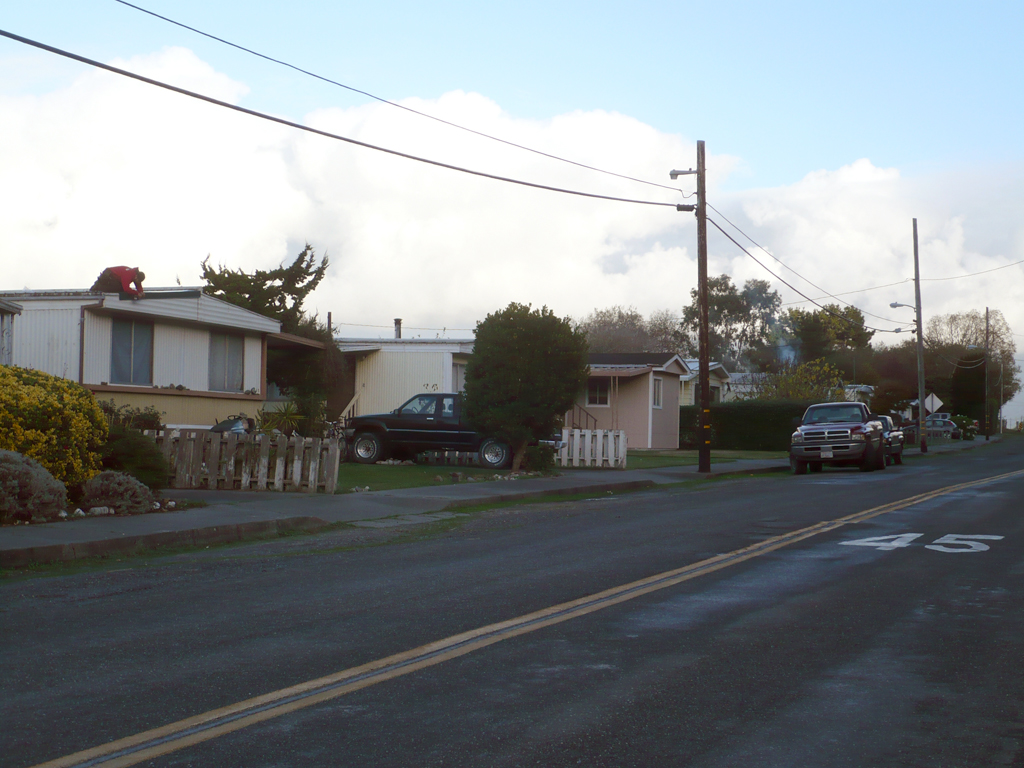
Meridian in 2013

Meridian is a former settlement in Humboldt County, California, United States. It was located 1 mile (1.6 km) west of Ferndale.

Meridian was laid out by Jacob Gyer in 1878.
