= St. Augustine of Canterbury Anglican Church =

Historic church in California, United States

- St. John's Episcopal Church
- U.S. National Register of Historic Places
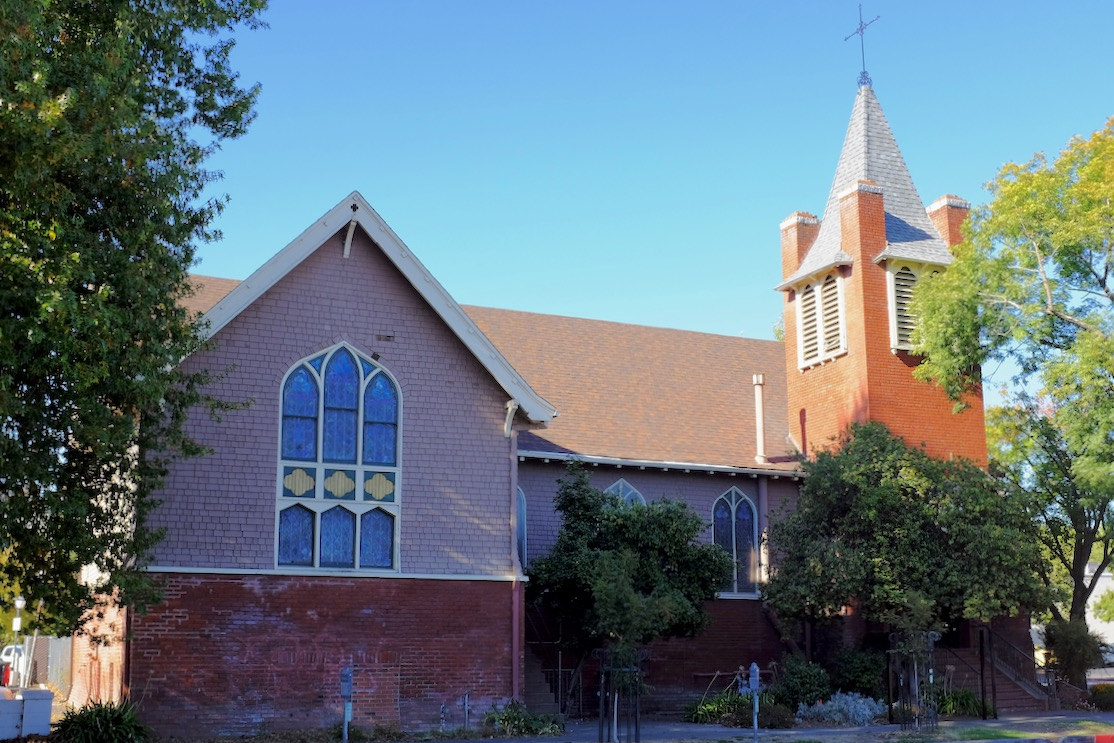

- Location within California Location within the United States
- Location: 230 Salem St. Chico, California
- Coordinates: 39°43′44″N 121°50′25″W
- Area: 0.1 acres (0.040 ha)
- Built: 1905
- Architect: Arthur Benton
- Architectural style: Late Gothic Revival
- NRHP reference No.: 82002171
- Added to NRHP: January 21, 1982

St. Augustine of Canterbury Anglican Church (formerly St. John's Episcopal Church) is a historic church at 228 Salem Street in the South Campus Neighborhood of Chico, California, United States. It was built in 1905 at the southeast corner of West Fifth and Broadway Streets in Downtown Chico. The building was moved about three blocks, in 1912, to the northwest corner of West Second and Salem Streets.

It was added to the National Register of Historic Places in 1982. It was deemed significant as a work of a master architect, Arthur Benton. Its National Register nomination asserted it "is a sophisticated design statement which demonstrates the architect's skillful integration of Gothic Revival and Shingle Style elements; the high quality of its design and workmanship set it apart as an outstanding example of ecclesiastical architecture of the period.

In 1982, the building was sold to Bill and Amy Pang who converted it into a Chinese restaurant and dance club. It was purchased and reconsecrated by St. Augustine of Canterbury Anglican Church in 1994.
