= Inskip Hotel =

- U.S. National Register of Historic Places
- California Historical Landmark
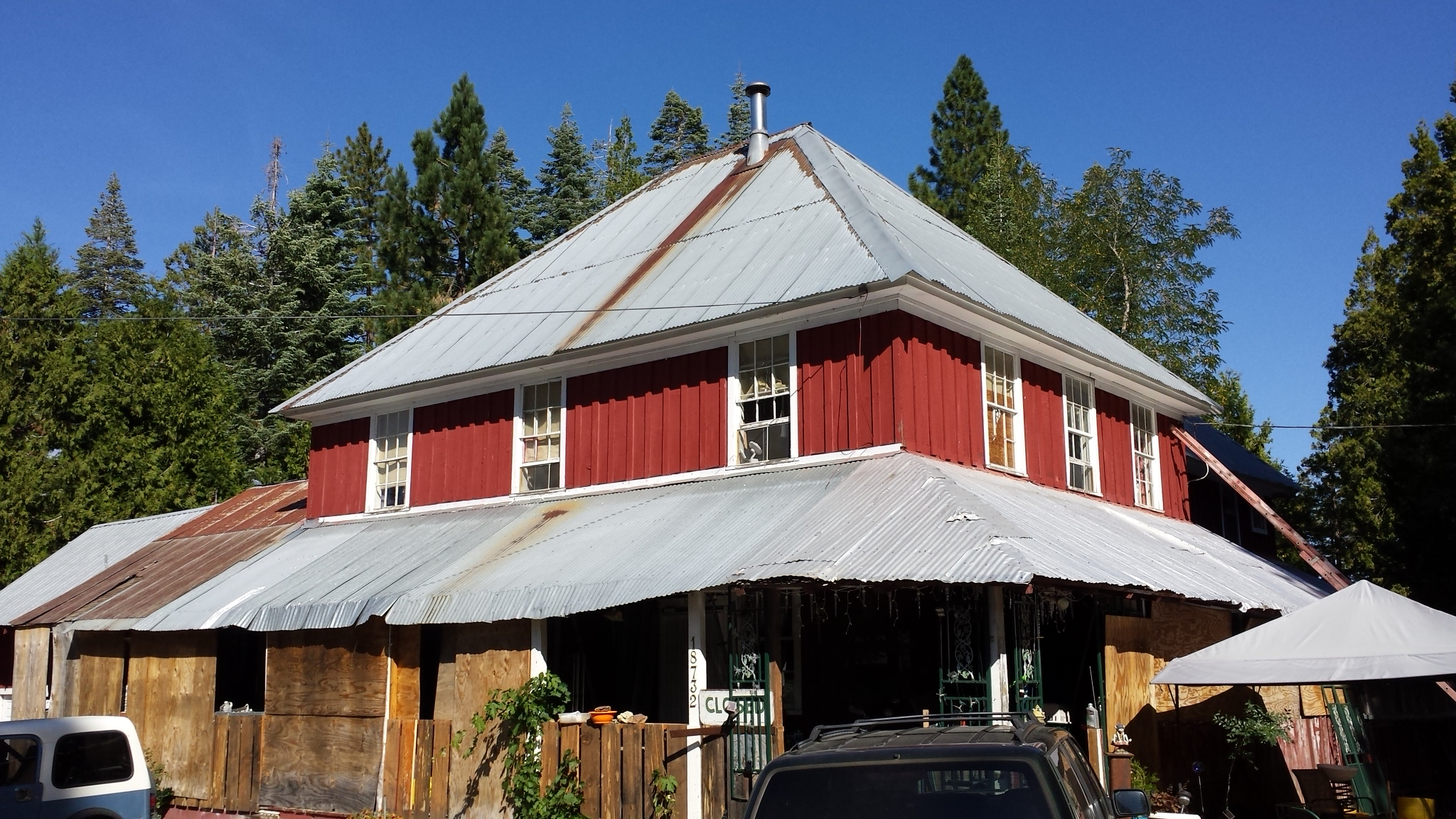

- Location within California
- Location: Inskip, California
- Coordinates: 39°59′25.33″N 121°32′29″W
- Area: Stirling City, (Butte County) California - 6 mi. N of Stirling City on Skyway (Old Humbug Rd.)
- Built: 1868
- NRHP reference No.: 76000478
- CHISL No.: N355
- Added to NRHP: May 2, 1975

The Inskip Hotel was built in 1866, just north of Stirling City, California (Butte County, California), and was added to the U.S. National Register of Historic Places (75000425) in 1975. The town itself was named after Mr. Edward “Doc” Watts Inskeep (commonly pronounced Inskip, therefore spelled that way) who first established a sawmill here and apparently discovered gold at this location in 1857.

== Construction ==
After the original hotel burnt down after only two years of operation, the second built was a two-story, wood-frame structure of vertical boards and batten with an open veranda across the first story front. It had a high gable roof, simple sash windows with no ornamentation.

== History ==
The town of Inskip, California was developed by P.M. Kelly in 1857. It was originally established along a stage coach route in a mining area north of Stirling City, which attracted both miners and enterprising business owners. The first hotel in Inskip was built in either 1857 or 1866 (see commentary, below). According to currently available sources, the structure built in 1866 and was originally named the Kelly & Company Hotel. In 1866 it was purchased by John Stokes who renamed it the Stokes Hotel. The hotel was destroyed by fire in 1868 and then rebuilt. After reconstruction, it was most likely renamed the Inskip Hotel. Local legend indicates that the fire was an act of arson. Local lore indicates that a resident ghost named Charlie is still looking for the arsonist. A commemorative plaque that appears on the hotel briefly records the history of the Inskip Inn:

This historic inn, first built in 1857 by Pat Kelley was sold to John Stokes in 1866. Destroyed by fire in 1868 and rebuilt in 1868, it is the only remaining hotel of 5 hotels which served the Inskip mining community. A gold strike in the early 1850s brought in a population of over a thousand by 1860. Inskip was the major midway station on the old Oroville-Susanville-Honey Lake Road. A distance of about 140 rugged miles of dust or mud. August 25, 1974

The creator(s) of the plaque places the first inn's construction in 1857 which is the year P.M. Kelly founded the town of Inskip. The Chico State (Identifier sc51582) also reports on one photo of their media collection that Rebekah J. Rugh and her husband were the proprietors of a hotel in Inskip, California from 1857 to 1861. It is uncertain at this time whether the correct date for the first "Inskip Inn" was 1857 or 1866 or if they were the same or different structures. However, it does appear likely that the current hotel that stands today was built in 1868 after the one at that same location was destroyed by fire in 1866.

== Present role ==
During its history it has operated almost continuously as a hotel until around the late 1990s when it was purchased and used as a private residence. As a result of an earlier estate sale, many of the historic fixtures were sold. There were plans to restore the Inn and rename it the Inskip Inn & Bar with the plan to reopen in late 2003 or 2004. As of 2014, the structure still remained used as a private residence.

== 2001 shootout ==
In July 2001, the Inskip Inn also made local and national news for being the location of a violent shootout between 2 sheriff's deputies and an armed assailant. Butte County Lt. Larry Estes and Deputy Bill Hunter had responded to a complaint that the assailant, Richard Gerald Bracklow, threatened the owners of the Inskip Inn, which was near his cabin, and stole one or more guns. Both deputies and the assailant died of gunshot wounds received as a result of the altercation.
