= Silberstein Park Building =

- U.S. National Register of Historic Places
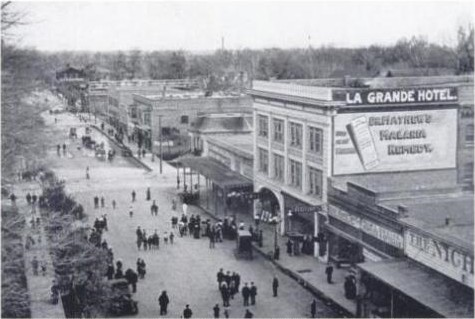
- Silberstein Park Building 1914

- Location within California
- Location: 426, 430 and 434 Broadway, Chico, California
- Coordinates: 39°43′41″N 121°50′17″W
- Area: 0.2 acres (0.081 ha)
- Architect: A.J. Byron
- NRHP reference No.: 83001175
- Added to NRHP: February 17, 1983

The Silberstein Park Building is a building in downtown Chico, California located across from Chico's City Plaza. It was listed on the National Register of Historic Places in 1983.

It is a three-story two-part commercial block building with facade of white terra cotta brick. It features Classical Revival details.

It was designed by A.J. Byron to be an office building, however the building was used as a movie theater named The Lyric, and for many years as the La Grande Hotel. The building suffered fire damage in 1924. The La Grande Hotel ceased operations in 1981. Local developers Bob Fortino and Bud Tracy refurbished the building in 1984.
