= Sierra City, California =

Sierra City
- census-designated place
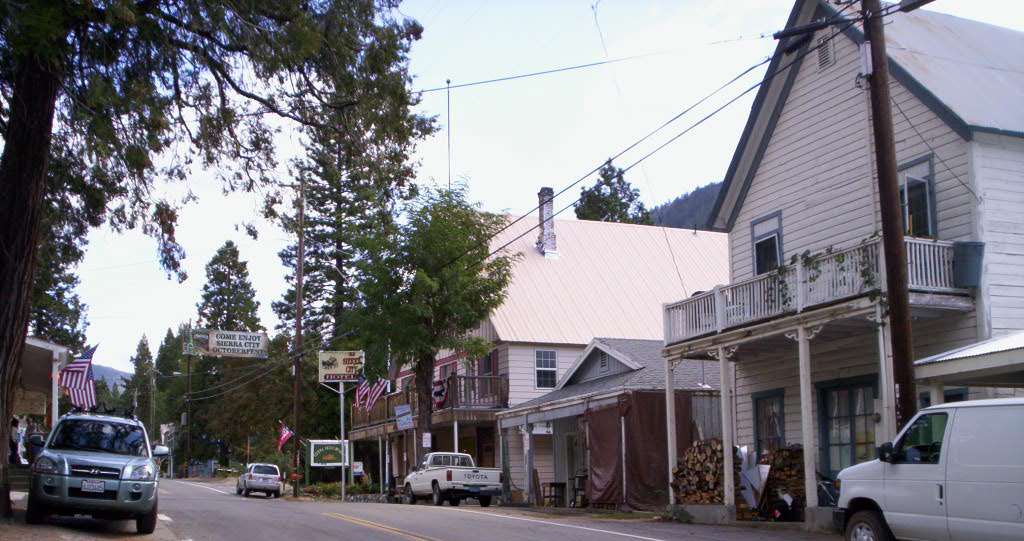

- Location within the state of California Sierra City (the United States)
- Coordinates: 39°34′24″N 120°38′13″W
- Country: United States
- State: California
- County: Sierra

Area
  - Total: 2.151 sq mi (5.571 km^{2})
  - Land: 2.151 sq mi (5.570 km^{2})
  - Water: 0.00039 sq mi (0.001 km^{2}) 0.01%
- Elevation: 4,147 ft (1,264 m)

Population (2020)
  - Total: 235
  - Density: 109/sq mi (42.2/km^{2})
- Time zone: UTC-8 (Pacific (PST))
  - Summer (DST): UTC-7 (PDT)
- GNIS feature ID: 2583139

Sierra City (Sierra, Spanish for "mountain range") is a census-designated place in Sierra County, California, United States. The elevation of Sierra City is 4,147 feet (1,264 m), and the town is situated in the canyon of the North Yuba River on California State Route 49, twelve miles northeast of the county seat of Sierra County, Downieville. The population was 235 at the 2020 census.

== History ==
Kentucky Mine and Museum in Sierra City, California

Kentucky Mine stamp mill building

Before the California Gold Rush, only Native Americans had ventured into the area, which lies northwest of Lake Tahoe on the western slope of the Sierra Nevada, and which lay between areas inhabited by Maidu, Nisenan, and Washo peoples (Pre-Contact Tribal Map). The area is now part of the Tahoe National Forest.

A settlement was established in 1850 by Philo A. Haven and Joseph Zumwalt, who were also involved with the settling of Downieville (Sinnott). In the winter of 1852–1853, however, an avalanche of snow destroyed the settlement, which was not rebuilt for several years. Ferdinand, Gustav, and Christian Reis purchased several mining claims near the Sierra Buttes and began to resettle Sierra City, which had a peak population of 3,000 during the decade after gold was discovered in California (1849).

Numerous hard-rock gold mines were developed on both sides of the North Yuba River Canyon near Sierra City. These include the Colombo Mine, the Independence Mine, the Keystone Mine, the Monumental Mine, the Great Sierra Buttes Mine, and the William Tell Mine. The Monumental Nugget, weighing over 106 pounds avoirdupois, was recovered in September 1869.

Placer mining was also practiced and continues today on the banks of the North Yuba.

== Historic buildings ==
Historic buildings that remain in Sierra City, all on the town's main street, which is Highway 49, include the two-story brick Busch Building, which the Wells Fargo Company occupied in the 19th century, the Masonic Lodge #164, and the Old Sierra City Hotel, built in 1886 by John G. Rose, which was known as the Capitol Hotel and housed local miners and offered meals and lodging for 25 cents each. The former Sierra City School, built as a one-room schoolhouse in 1883, was listed on the National Register of Historic Places in January 2024. The Bigelow House, a Victorian structure, is situated near the town's southwestern limits. The town hall, a log structure, was built after World War II, and a new post office, dedicated in 1969, features stone work in which antique mining implements, including an ore-car, are embedded. The cemetery contains gravestones dating back to the 1860s.

== Cultural attractions ==
The town-limit signs list Sierra City's population as 225. The main industry is tourism. None of the nearby hard-rock mines are in operation, but the Kentucky mine just outside the town limits now houses a mining museum. In the summer months, fishing in the North Yuba and its tributaries and in nearby alpine lakes is popular, as is mountain-biking, placer-mining, and hiking. A cluster of sheer rock peaks, known as the Sierra Buttes, 7,818-foot high (2,383 m), is 1.6 miles (2.6 km) from Sierra City and towers over the town. Many trails cross the area, and the Pacific Crest Trail crosses the flanks of the Sierra Buttes some 2,000 feet (610 m) above the town. Wild Plum Campground is a little more than a mile away on Haypress Creek.

The nearest public school is 12 miles (19 km) away in Downieville.

== Geography ==
According to the United States Census Bureau, the CDP covers an area of 2.2 square miles (5.6 km^{2}), of which 99.99% is land and 0.01% is water.

Sierra City has a mediterranean continental climate (Koppen: Dsb). Summers are hot and dry, while winters are mild, wet and very snowy, with annual snowfall averaging 107 inches (272 cm).

Climate data for Sierra City, California
Month	Jan	Feb	Mar	Apr	May	Jun	Jul	Aug	Sep	Oct	Nov	Dec	Year
Record high °F (°C)	70 (21)	78 (26)	84 (29)	86 (30)	94 (34)	101 (38)	103 (39)	104 (40)	102 (39)	92 (33)	85 (29)	76 (24)	104 (40)
Mean daily maximum °F (°C)	45.9 (7.7)	47.4 (8.6)	52.3 (11.3)	57.9 (14.4)	66.5 (19.2)	75.7 (24.3)	84.0 (28.9)	84.1 (28.9)	77.9 (25.5)	66.9 (19.4)	53.1 (11.7)	45.0 (7.2)	63.1 (17.3)
Daily mean °F (°C)	37.5 (3.1)	38.5 (3.6)	42.7 (5.9)	46.8 (8.2)	54.6 (12.6)	62.2 (16.8)	68.7 (20.4)	68.5 (20.3)	63.3 (17.4)	54.1 (12.3)	43.0 (6.1)	37.3 (2.9)	51.4 (10.8)
Mean daily minimum °F (°C)	29.1 (−1.6)	29.6 (−1.3)	32.0 (0.0)	35.8 (2.1)	42.7 (5.9)	48.7 (9.3)	53.5 (11.9)	53.0 (11.7)	48.7 (9.3)	41.3 (5.2)	32.9 (0.5)	29.5 (−1.4)	39.7 (4.3)
Record low °F (°C)	3 (−16)	5 (−15)	9 (−13)	15 (−9)	24 (−4)	28 (−2)	32 (0)	33 (1)	31 (−1)	21 (−6)	12 (−11)	1 (−17)	1 (−17)
Average precipitation inches (mm)	10.67 (271)	13.12 (333)	9.43 (240)	4.55 (116)	3.19 (81)	0.92 (23)	0.17 (4.3)	0.32 (8.1)	1.26 (32)	4.95 (126)	9.01 (229)	11.79 (299)	69.38 (1,762.4)
Average snowfall inches (cm)	22.2 (56)	20.4 (52)	20.0 (51)	5.1 (13)	1.3 (3.3)	0.0 (0.0)	0.0 (0.0)	0.0 (0.0)	0.0 (0.0)	0.6 (1.5)	8.7 (22)	17.3 (44)	95.6 (242.8)
Average precipitation days (≥ 0.01 in)	11.1	8.8	12.1	8.6	7.0	3.8	1.3	1.6	4.1	6.2	10.6	9.8	85
Average snowy days (≥ 0.1 in)	4.1	3.3	4.0	1.2	0.2	0.0	0.0	0.0	0.0	0.5	1.9	3.0	18.2
Source: WRCC, (1981-2000 normals, snowfall 1910-2000)

== Demographics ==
Historical population
Census	Pop.	Note	%±
2010	221		—
2020	235		6.3%
U.S. Decennial Census; 2010

Sierra City first appeared as a census designated place in the 2010 U.S. census.

=== Racial and ethnic composition ===
Sierra City CDP, California – Racial and ethnic composition Note: the US Census treats Hispanic/Latino as an ethnic category. This table excludes Latinos from the racial categories and assigns them to a separate category. Hispanics/Latinos may be of any race.
Race / Ethnicity (NH = Non-Hispanic)	Pop 2010	Pop 2020	% 2010	% 2020
White alone (NH)	193	193	87.33%	82.13%
Black or African American alone (NH)	0	0	0.00%	0.00%
Native American or Alaska Native alone (NH)	2	0	0.90%	0.00%
Asian alone (NH)	3	2	1.36%	0.85%
Native Hawaiian or Pacific Islander alone (NH)	0	0	0.00%	0.00%
Other race alone (NH)	0	1	0.00%	0.43%
Mixed race or Multiracial (NH)	2	9	0.90%	3.83%
Hispanic or Latino (any race)	21	30	9.50%	12.77%
Total	221	235	100.00%	100.00%

=== 2020 census ===
The 2020 United States census reported that Sierra City had a population of 235. The population density was 109.3 inhabitants per square mile (42.2/km^{2}). The racial makeup of Sierra City was 198 (84.3%) White, 0 (0.0%) African American, 0 (0.0%) Native American, 2 (0.9%) Asian, 0 (0.0%) Pacific Islander, 9 (3.8%) from other races, and 26 (11.1%) from two or more races. Hispanic or Latino of any race were 30 persons (12.8%).

The whole population lived in households. There were 129 households, out of which 17 (13.2%) had children under the age of 18 living in them, 53 (41.1%) were married-couple households, 9 (7.0%) were cohabiting couple households, 44 (34.1%) had a female householder with no partner present, and 23 (17.8%) had a male householder with no partner present. 44 households (34.1%) were one person, and 23 (17.8%) were one person aged 65 or older. The average household size was 1.82. There were 69 families (53.5% of all households).

The age distribution was 9 people (3.8%) under the age of 18, 20 people (8.5%) aged 18 to 24, 49 people (20.9%) aged 25 to 44, 75 people (31.9%) aged 45 to 64, and 82 people (34.9%) who were 65 years of age or older. The median age was 57.5 years. For every 100 females, there were 130.4 males.

There were 289 housing units at an average density of 134.4 units per square mile (51.9 units/km^{2}), of which 129 (44.6%) were occupied. Of these, 106 (82.2%) were owner-occupied, and 23 (17.8%) were occupied by renters.

== Politics ==
In the state legislature, Sierra City is in the 1st senatorial district, represented by Republican Megan Dahle, and the 1st Assembly district, represented by Republican Heather Hadwick.

Federally, Sierra City is in California's 3rd congressional district, represented by Independent Kevin Kiley.

== Sources ==
- California-Indian Pre-Contact Tribal Areas Map,
- Kelly, Leslie A. Traveling California's Gold Rush Country. Falcon, 1997.
- Sinnott, James J. History of Sierra City and History of Goodyear's Bar [one volume], 1978.
- Sinnott, James J. History of Sierra County, 1977.
