= Oregon City, California =

Unincorporated community in California, United States

Oregon City
- Ghost town
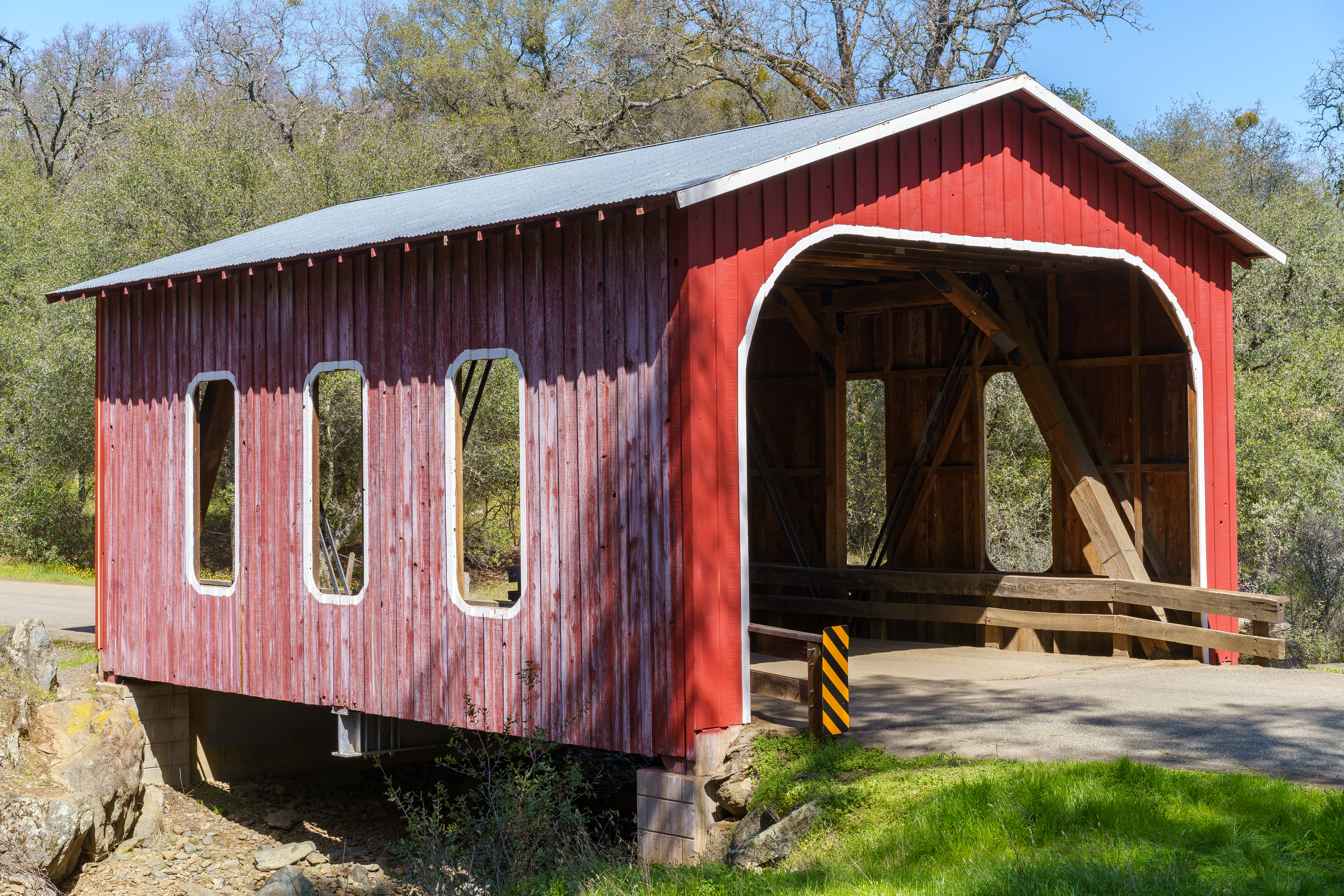
- Castleberry Covered Bridge in March 2021

- Location in California
- Coordinates: 39°35′38″N 121°31′46″W
- Country: United States
- State: California
- County: Butte
- Elevation: 1,184 ft (361 m)

California Historical Landmark
- Reference no.: 807

Oregon City, formerly Bloomingdale and Hengy, is a ghost town located between Oroville and Cherokee in Butte County, California, United States. One of the first mining camps in the county, it was established in the autumn of 1848 by a party of Oregonians, who came to California over the Applegate and Lassen trails. Little more than a year later their captain, Peter H. Burnett, became the first civil Governor of California. For a time, Oregon City prospered as a gold mining and supply center, then it declined into virtual oblivion. It lies 1,184 feet (361 m) above mean sea level.

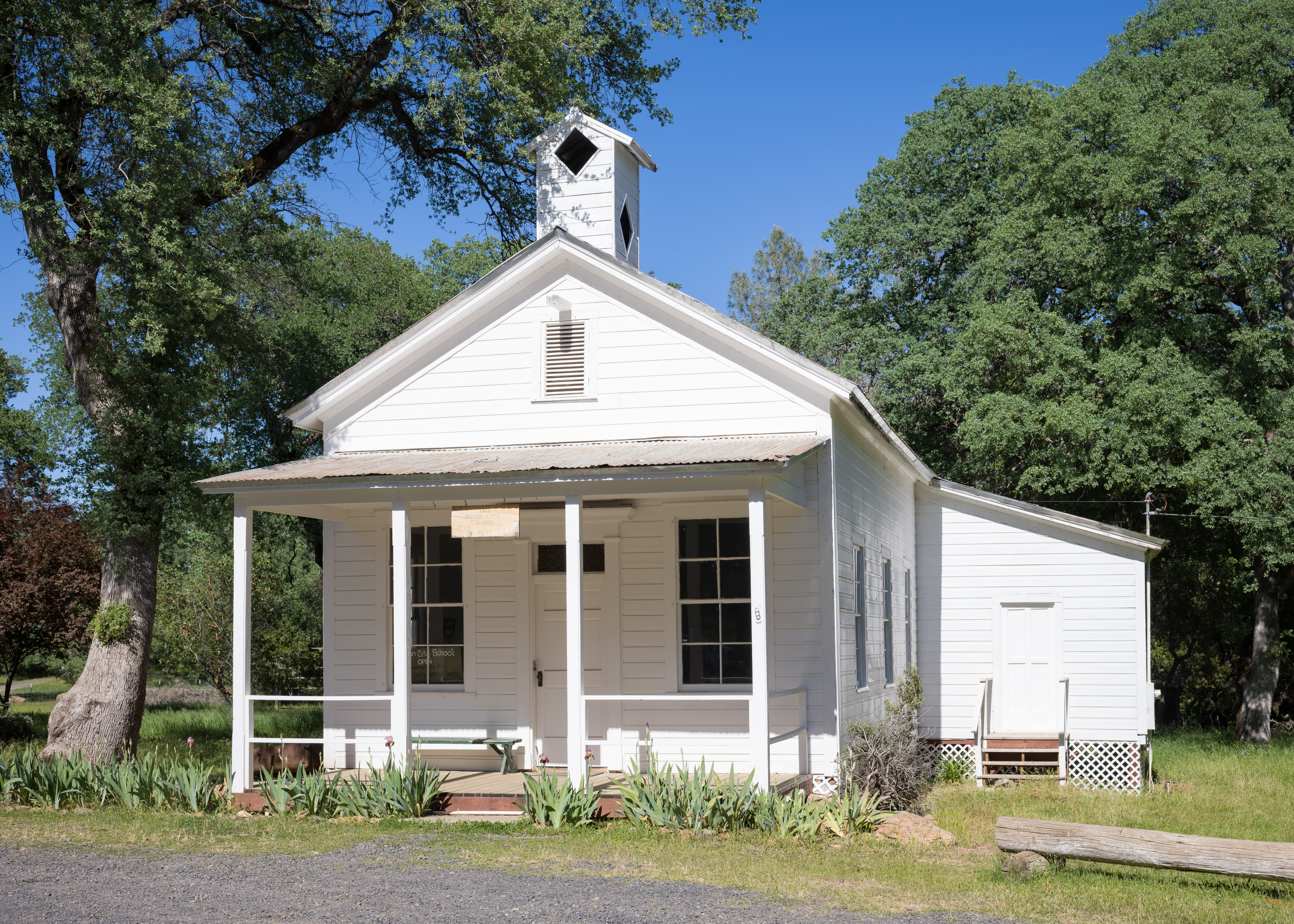
The historic schoolhouse, built in 1872

The Hengy post office operated from 1894 to 1900 and from 1901 to 1902; it was named after the first postmaster, Jessie Hengy. The Bloomingdale post office operated from 1902 to 1905.

The site of the camp is now a California Historical Landmark.

The Oregon City Covered Bridge, also known as the Castleberry Covered Bridge, is located near Oregon City.
