= Magalia, California =

- Unincorporated community
- Location in Butte County and the state of California

- Location in the United States
- Coordinates: 39°50′N 121°35′W
- Country: United States
- State: California
- County: Butte

Government
  - State Senator: Megan Dahle (R)
  - State Assembly: Vacant
  - U. S. Congress: James Gallagher (R)

Area
  - Total: 14.025 sq mi (36.324 km^{2})
  - Land: 14.021 sq mi (36.313 km^{2})
  - Water: 0.0042 sq mi (0.011 km^{2}) 0.03%
- Elevation: 2,333 ft (711 m)

Population (2020)
  - Total: 7,795
  - Density: 556.0/sq mi (214.7/km^{2})
- Time zone: UTC−08:00 (PST)
  - Summer (DST): UTC−07:00 (PDT)
- ZIP Code: 95954
- Area codes: 530, 837
- FIPS code: 06-45120
- GNIS feature ID: 1659035; 2408161

Magalia (formerly Butte Mills and Dogtown) is an unincorporated community and census-designated place (CDP) in Butte County, California, United States. The population was 7,795 at the 2020 census, down from 11,310 at the 2010 census.

== History ==
Originally established after the 1849 California Gold Rush as a mining camp, the town was first called Mountain View. A dog breeding operation started in 1850 which led to the name Dogtown. A post office opened in 1857, which was shared with the adjacent settlement of Mill City; the two eventually united. In 1861 the name was changed to Magalia after the Latin word for cottages.

On April 12, 1859, at the Willard Claim, a hydraulic mine in the Feather River Canyon northeast of the town, a 54-pound (20 kg) gold nugget was discovered, the largest in the world at the time. Dubbed the "Dogtown Nugget", it made the town famous.

=== 2018 fire ===
The community suffered extensive damage in the Camp Fire, a wildfire which began on November 8, 2018. As of December 13, Butte County Sheriff's Department reported that at least seven people died in Magalia during the Camp Fire. Some survivors sheltered in place at a Baptist church along the only evacuation route north of the ridge.

== Geography and natural history ==
According to the United States Census Bureau, the CDP has a total area of 14.0 square miles (36 km^{2}), all land. There are numerous flora and fauna species found in the vicinity, including mammals such as Black tailed deer, raccoon, and grey squirrel. A considerable number of amphibians are also found such as the Rough-skinned Newt, whose southern range in the California interior occurs near Magalia. The soil, deep reddish-brown loam for the most part, supports forest dominated by tall incense cedar and bull pine.

== Demographics ==
Historical population
Census	Pop.	Note	%±
1990	8,987		—
2000	10,569		17.6%
2010	11,310		7.0%
2020	7,795		−31.1%
U.S. Decennial Census; 1990 2000 2010

Magalia first appeared as a census designated place in the 1990 U.S. census.

=== Racial and ethnic composition ===
Magalia CDP, California – Racial and ethnic composition Note: the US Census treats Hispanic/Latino as an ethnic category. This table excludes Latinos from the racial categories and assigns them to a separate category. Hispanics/Latinos may be of any race.
Race / Ethnicity (NH = Non-Hispanic)	Pop 2000	Pop 2010	Pop 2020	% 2000	% 2010	% 2020
White alone (NH)	9,611	9,893	6,336	90.94%	87.47%	81.28%
Black or African American alone (NH)	39	39	36	0.37%	0.34%	0.46%
Native American or Alaska Native alone (NH)	97	118	84	0.92%	1.04%	1.08%
Asian alone (NH)	59	87	85	0.56%	0.77%	1.09%
Native Hawaiian or Pacific Islander alone (NH)	9	17	9	0.09%	0.15%	0.12%
Other race alone (NH)	20	13	37	0.19%	0.11%	0.47%
Mixed race or Multiracial (NH)	218	378	517	2.06%	3.34%	6.63%
Hispanic or Latino (any race)	516	765	691	4.88%	6.76%	8.86%
Total	10,569	11,310	7,795	100.00%	100.00%	100.00%

=== 2020 census ===
As of the 2020 census, Magalia had a population of 7,795 and a population density of 556.0 inhabitants per square mile (214.7/km^{2}). 88.5% of residents lived in urban areas, while 11.5% lived in rural areas. The census reported that 98.9% of the population lived in households, 1.1% lived in non-institutionalized group quarters, and no one was institutionalized.

The racial makeup of Magalia was 84.3% White, 0.5% Black or African American, 1.6% American Indian and Alaska Native, 1.1% Asian, 0.1% Native Hawaiian and Other Pacific Islander, 2.5% from other races, and 9.9% from two or more races. Hispanic or Latino residents of any race were 8.9% of the population.

There were 3,103 households, out of which 22.3% had children under the age of 18 living in them. Of all households, 43.4% were married-couple households, 9.7% were cohabiting couple households, 22.3% were households with a male householder and no spouse or partner present, and 24.5% were households with a female householder and no spouse or partner present. About 25.9% of all households were made up of individuals and 14.1% had someone living alone who was 65 years of age or older. The average household size was 2.48. There were 2,011 families (64.8% of all households).

The age distribution was 18.1% under the age of 18, 6.0% aged 18 to 24, 21.0% aged 25 to 44, 29.2% aged 45 to 64, and 25.7% who were 65 years of age or older. The median age was 49.6 years. For every 100 females there were 103.8 males, and for every 100 females age 18 and over there were 104.3 males age 18 and over.

There were 3,442 housing units at an average density of 245.5 units per square mile (94.8 units/km^{2}), of which 3,103 (90.2%) were occupied. Of occupied units, 80.5% were owner-occupied and 19.5% were occupied by renters. Of all housing units, 9.8% were vacant. The homeowner vacancy rate was 3.1% and the rental vacancy rate was 4.6%.

=== Demographic estimates ===
In 2023, the US Census Bureau estimated that 3.7% of the population were foreign-born. Of all people aged 5 or older, 93.6% spoke only English at home, 2.9% spoke Spanish, 1.7% spoke other Indo-European languages, 1.8% spoke Asian or Pacific Islander languages, and 0.0% spoke other languages. Of those aged 25 or older, 91.4% were high school graduates and 20.1% had a bachelor's degree.

=== Income and poverty ===
The median household income in 2023 was $60,625, and the per capita income was $30,786. About 6.8% of families and 14.6% of the population were below the poverty line.

=== 2010 census ===
The 2010 United States census reported that Magalia had a population of 11,310. The population density was 806.8 inhabitants per square mile (311.5/km^{2}). The racial makeup of Magalia was 10,398 (91.9%) White, 40 (0.4%) African American, 141 (1.2%) Native American, 90 (0.8%) Asian, 17 (0.2%) Pacific Islander, 134 (1.2%) from other races, and 490 (4.3%) from two or more races. Hispanic or Latino of any race were 765 persons (6.8%).

The Census reported that 11,297 people (99.9% of the population) lived in households, 13 (0.1%) lived in non-institutionalized group quarters, and 0 (0%) were institutionalized.

There were 4,825 households, out of which 1,217 (25.2%) had children under the age of 18 living in them, 2,483 (51.5%) were opposite-sex married couples living together, 515 (10.7%) had a female householder with no husband present, 278 (5.8%) had a male householder with no wife present. There were 311 (6.4%) unmarried opposite-sex partnerships, and 34 (0.7%) same-sex married couples or partnerships. 1,239 households (25.7%) were made up of individuals, and 623 (12.9%) had someone living alone who was 65 years of age or older. The average household size was 2.34. There were 3,276 families (67.9% of all households); the average family size was 2.75.

The population was spread out, with 2,165 people (19.1%) under the age of 18, 789 people (7.0%) aged 18 to 24, 2,104 people (18.6%) aged 25 to 44, 3,573 people (31.6%) aged 45 to 64, and 2,679 people (23.7%) who were 65 years of age or older. The median age was 49.0 years. For every 100 females, there were 97.8 males. For every 100 females age 18 and over, there were 95.7 males.

There were 5,355 housing units at an average density of 382.0 per square mile (147.5/km^{2}), of which 4,825 were occupied, of which 3,713 (77.0%) were owner-occupied, and 1,112 (23.0%) were occupied by renters. The homeowner vacancy rate was 2.7%; the rental vacancy rate was 7.1%. 8,212 people (72.6% of the population) lived in owner-occupied housing units and 3,085 people (27.3%) lived in rental housing units.

== Education ==
Almost all of Magalia is in the Paradise Unified School District. Small pieces of the census-designated place extend into the Chico Unified School District.
