= Rancho del Arroyo Chico =

Coordinates: 39.760°N 121.840°W

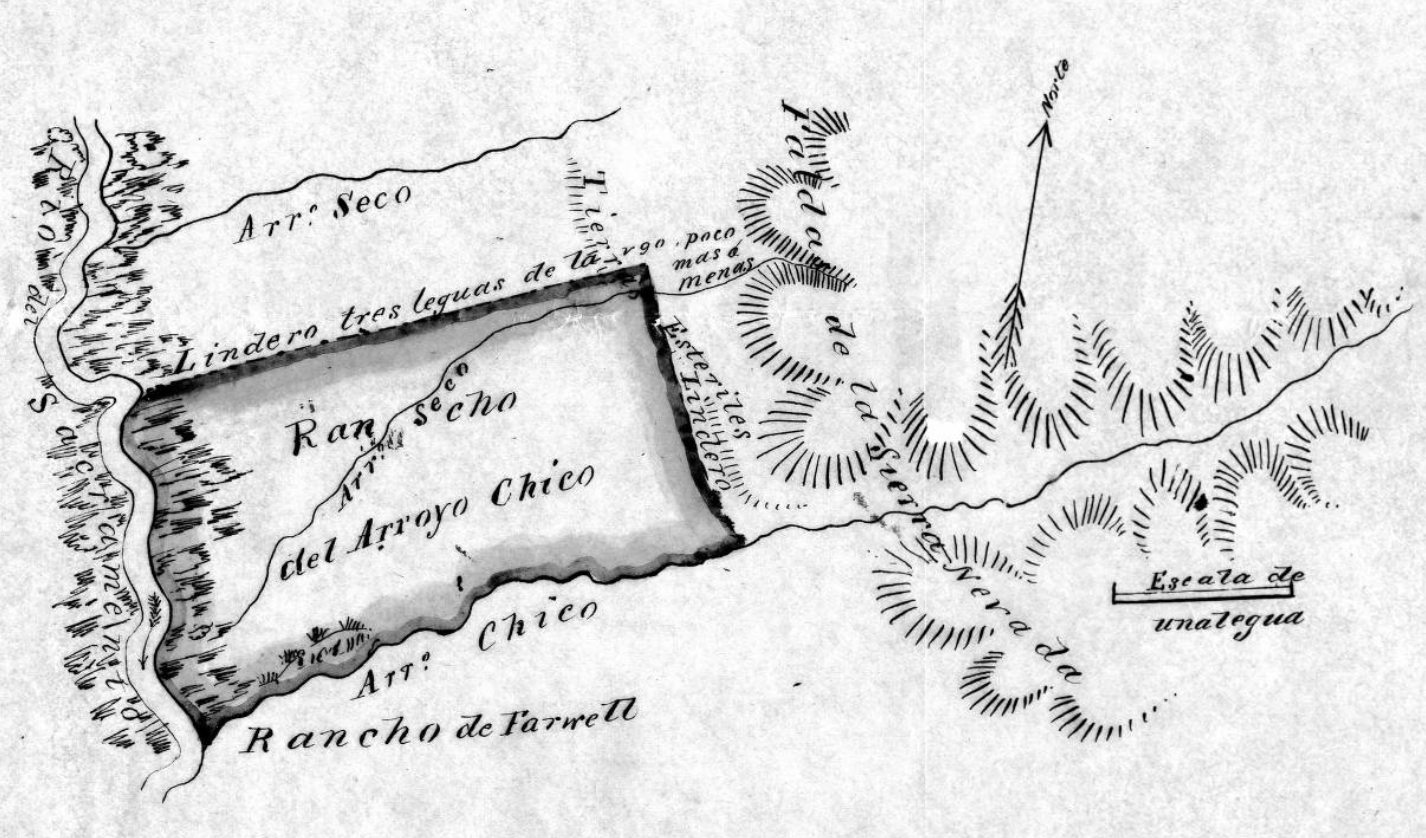

Rancho del Arroyo Chico was a 22,214-acre (89.90 km^{2}) Mexican land grant in present-day Butte County, California, which ultimately laid the foundation for the city of Chico. The name Arroyo Chico means 'little stream' and refers to Big Chico Creek. The grant was located along the north bank of Big Chico Creek, east of the Sacramento River and it encompassed present-day Chico.

== History ==
With Alta California under the control of the Mexican government, Governor Manuel Micheltorena granted Rancho del Arroyo Chico to William Dickey in 1844. Within a decade, ownership of the land transferred hands a number of times and settled in John Bidwell's (1819–1900) possession. Dickey, Bidwell, and George McKinstry, Jr. (1810–1882) had all worked at one time for John Sutter and were also partners in various mining ventures.

McKinstry came to California in 1846, worked for Sutter as clerk and as sheriff of Northern California District, and assisted in the rescue of the Donner Party. Dickey, wanting to return to his eastern home, sold Rancho Arroyo Chico to McKinstry in 1849. Within a few years, the rancho ended up under Bidwell's ownership. Eight years after selling the rancho, McKinstry moved to San Diego and practised as a physician there until his death.

Bidwell had been in the California scene for several years, having led the Bartleson-Bidwell Party in 1841. He soon found employment as Sutter's business manager, and within a few years he obtained a couple of Mexican land grants, including Rancho Los Ulpinos and Rancho Colus. In 1848, Bidwell discovered gold in Feather River, at a place now call Bidwell's Bar. Bidwell sold Rancho Colus, then acquired Rancho Arroyo Chico in two separate purchases.

In 1849, McKinstry sold to Bidwell an undivided half of the rancho. The following year he sold the other half interest to his brother-in-law Justus McKinstry, who sold it over to Bidwell in 1851.

With the cession of California to the United States following the Mexican-American War, the 1848 Treaty of Guadalupe Hidalgo provided that the land grants would be honored. As required by the Land Act of 1851, a claim for Rancho Arroyo Chico was filed with the Public Land Commission in 1852, and the grant was patented to John Bidwell in 1860 (patent No. 9).

Bidwell founded the city of Chico in 1860, laying out the community on the land of his Rancho Arroyo Chico on the north side of Chico Creek, as well as on part of Rancho Farwell on the south side of Chico Creek.

== Historic sites of the Rancho ==
- Bidwell Mansion State Historic Park
