= Polygonum bidwelliae =

Scientific classification
- Kingdom: Plantae
- Clade: Tracheophytes
- Clade: Angiosperms
- Clade: Eudicots
- Order: Caryophyllales
- Family: Polygonaceae
- Genus: Polygonum
- Species: P. bidwelliae

Binomial name
- Polygonum bidwelliae S.Watson 1879

Species of flowering plant

Polygonum bidwelliae is an uncommon species of flowering plant in the knotweed family known by the common name Bidwell's knotweed. The plant was named for American suffragist Annie Bidwell, who at one time lived in the Bidwell Mansion in Chico, California. She is the person who collected the type specimen in Northern California.

== Distribution ==
Polygonum bidwelliae is endemic to California, where it is known from the northern Sacramento Valley and adjacent slopes of the southernmost Cascade Range in Butte, Shasta, and Tehama Counties. It grows in chaparral, woodland, and grassland habitat on volcanic soils.

== Description ==
Polygonum bidwelliae is an annual herb producing an erect green, wiry, angled stem reaching 20 centimeters (8 inches) in height. The narrow, pointed leaves are oppositely arranged along the stem, mainly on the upper parts of stem branches. The leaves have relatively large stipules which form ochrea that sheath the stem, sometimes hiding the leaf bases. The sharp-pointed stipules are membranous and silvery white. Bright pink flowers occur in upper leaf axils.]
