= John Bidwell =

American politician (1819–1900)

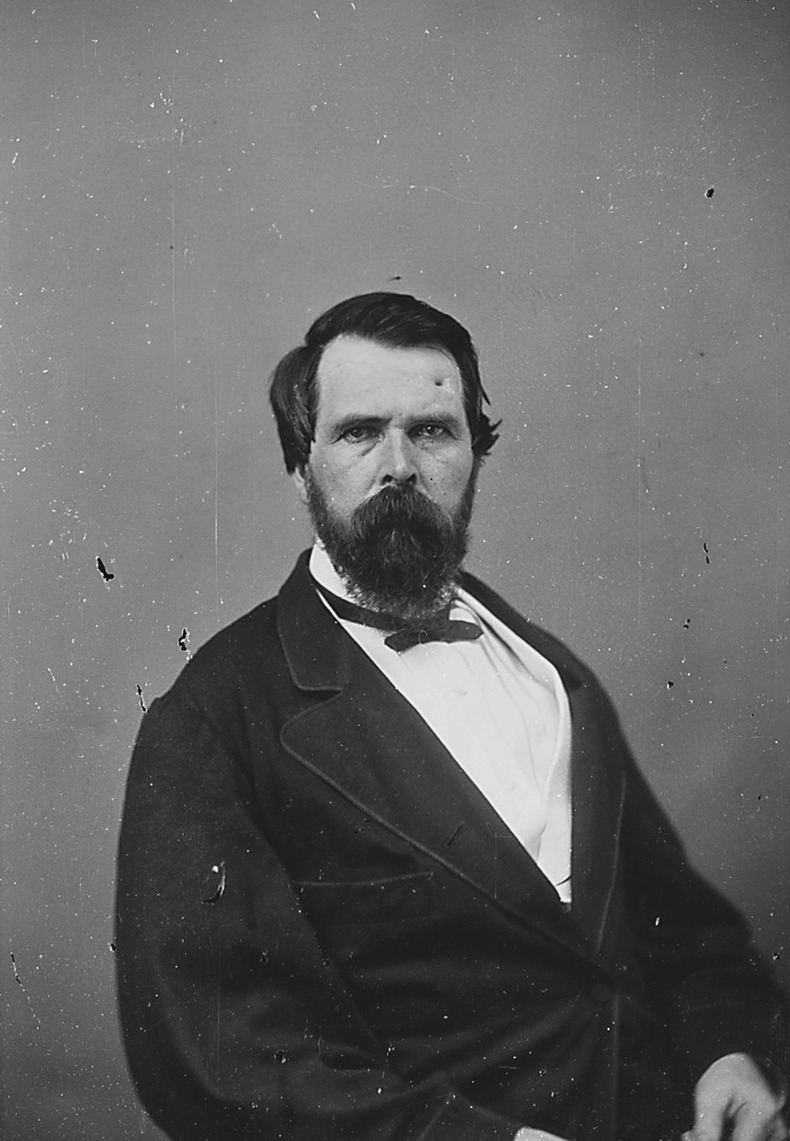
- Portrait by Brady c. 1865

Member of the U.S. House of Representatives from California's 3rd district
- In office March 4, 1865 – March 3, 1867
- Preceded by: Constituency established
- Succeeded by: James Johnson

Member of the California Senate from the Sacramento district
- In office December 17, 1849 – January 6, 1851
- Preceded by: Constituency established
- Succeeded by: Alonzo W. Adams

Alcalde of Mission San Luis Rey
- In office August 1846 – January 1847
- Appointed by: John C. Frémont

Personal details
- Born: August 5, 1819 Chautauqua County, New York, U.S.
- Died: April 4, 1900 (aged 80) Chico, California, U.S.
- Resting place: Chico Cemetery
- Party: Democratic (Before 1861); Republican (1861–1875); Prohibition (after 1875)
- Other political affiliations: National Union (1861–1868); People's Independent (1875); Anti-Monopoly (1875)
- Spouse: Annie Kennedy (m. 1868)

Military service
- Allegiance: United States; California Republic
- Rank: Brigadier General
- Unit: California Battalion
- Battles/wars: Mexican–American War; Bear Flag Revolt

John Bidwell (August 5, 1819 – April 4, 1900), known in Spanish as Don Juan Bidwell, was an American pioneer, politician, and soldier. Bidwell is known as the founder of the city of Chico, California. He served in the California Senate and then in the U.S. House of Representatives.

== Early life ==
Bidwell was born in 1819 in Chautauqua County, New York. His Bidwell ancestors immigrated to North America in the colonial era. His family moved to Erie, Pennsylvania, in 1829, and then to Ashtabula County, Ohio, in 1831. At age 17, he attended and shortly thereafter became principal of Kingsville Academy.

== Life in California ==
Daguerreotype by Brady, 1850

In 1841, at the age of 22, Bidwell became one of the first emigrants on the California Trail. John Sutter employed Bidwell as his business manager shortly after the younger man reached California. In October 1844, Bidwell went with Sutter to Monterey, where the two learned of an insurrection by leader José Castro and ex-governor Juan Bautista Alvarado. In 1845, Bidwell and Sutter joined Governor Manuel Micheltorena and a group of Americans and Indians to fight the insurrectionists, pursuing them to Cahuenga. Micheltorena, Sutter, and Bidwell were imprisoned, and the latter two were shortly thereafter released.

Upon release, Bidwell headed north through Placerita Canyon, saw the mining operations, and was determined to search for gold on his way to Sutter's Fort, where he met James W. Marshall. Shortly after Marshall's discovery of gold at Sutter's Mill, Bidwell also discovered gold on the Feather River, establishing a productive claim at Bidwell Bar in advance of the California Gold Rush. Bidwell obtained the four square-league Rancho Los Ulpinos land grant after being naturalized as a Mexican citizen in 1844, and the two square-league Rancho Colus grant on the Sacramento River in 1845. He later sold the latter grant and bought Rancho Arroyo Chico on Chico Creek to establish a ranch and farm.

=== Mexican-American War and military service ===
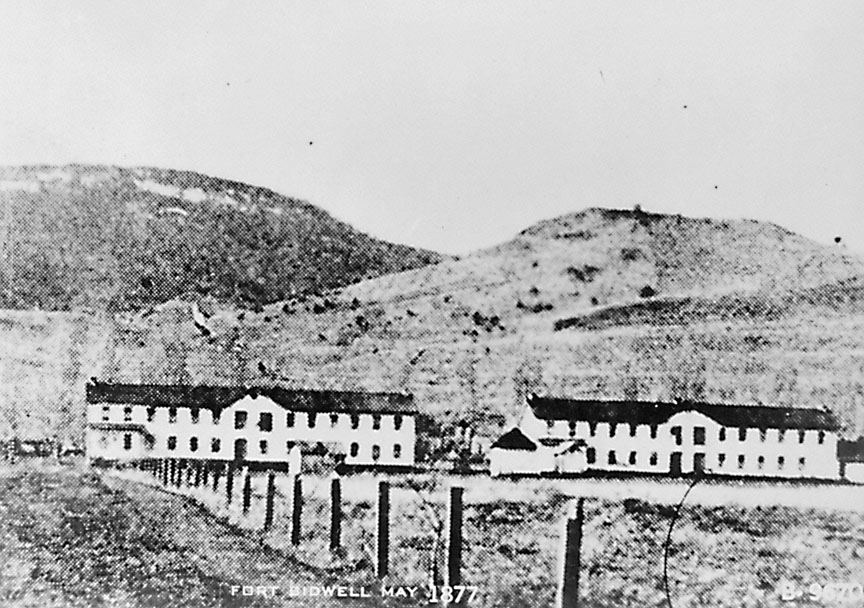
Fort Bidwell in 1877

Soon after the outbreak of the Mexican–American War, Bidwell met with the leaders of the Bear Flag Revolt and drafted their constitution. He later attained the rank of major while fighting at Fort Stockton. In August 1846, he was appointed Alcalde of Mission San Luis Rey by John C. Frémont, where he served until the end of the war. He was appointed brigadier general of the California Militia in 1863. From 1863 to 1864, Bidwell and other local financiers built the Humboldt Wagon Road connecting Chico to the mining districts of Nevada. Around this time, in 1865, General Bidwell backed a petition from settlers at Red Bluff, California to protect Red Bluff's trail to the Owyhee Mines of Idaho. The United States Army commissioned seven forts for this purpose. One site was near Fandango Pass at the base of the Warner Mountains, in the north end of Surprise Valley. On June 10, 1865, a fort (eventually named Fort Bidwell) was ordered to be built there. The fort was built amid escalating fighting with the Snake Indians of eastern Oregon and southern Idaho. It was a base for U.S. Army operations in the Snake War, that lasted until 1868, and the later Modoc War. Although traffic dwindled on the Red Bluff route once the Central Pacific Railroad extended into Nevada in 1868, the Army staffed Fort Bidwell until 1890 to quell various uprisings and disturbances. A Paiute reservation and small community maintain the name Fort Bidwell.

=== Belle ship disaster ===
On February 5, 1856, Bidwell was one of several passengers traveling down the Sacramento River on the steamboat Belle when the ship's boiler exploded, killing several people instantly. Bidwell was sitting by the stove reading a newspaper when the explosion sent a piece of shrapnel the size of a quarter directly into his skull. Bidwell survived, but spent the rest of his life with a visible hole in his head.

== Political career ==
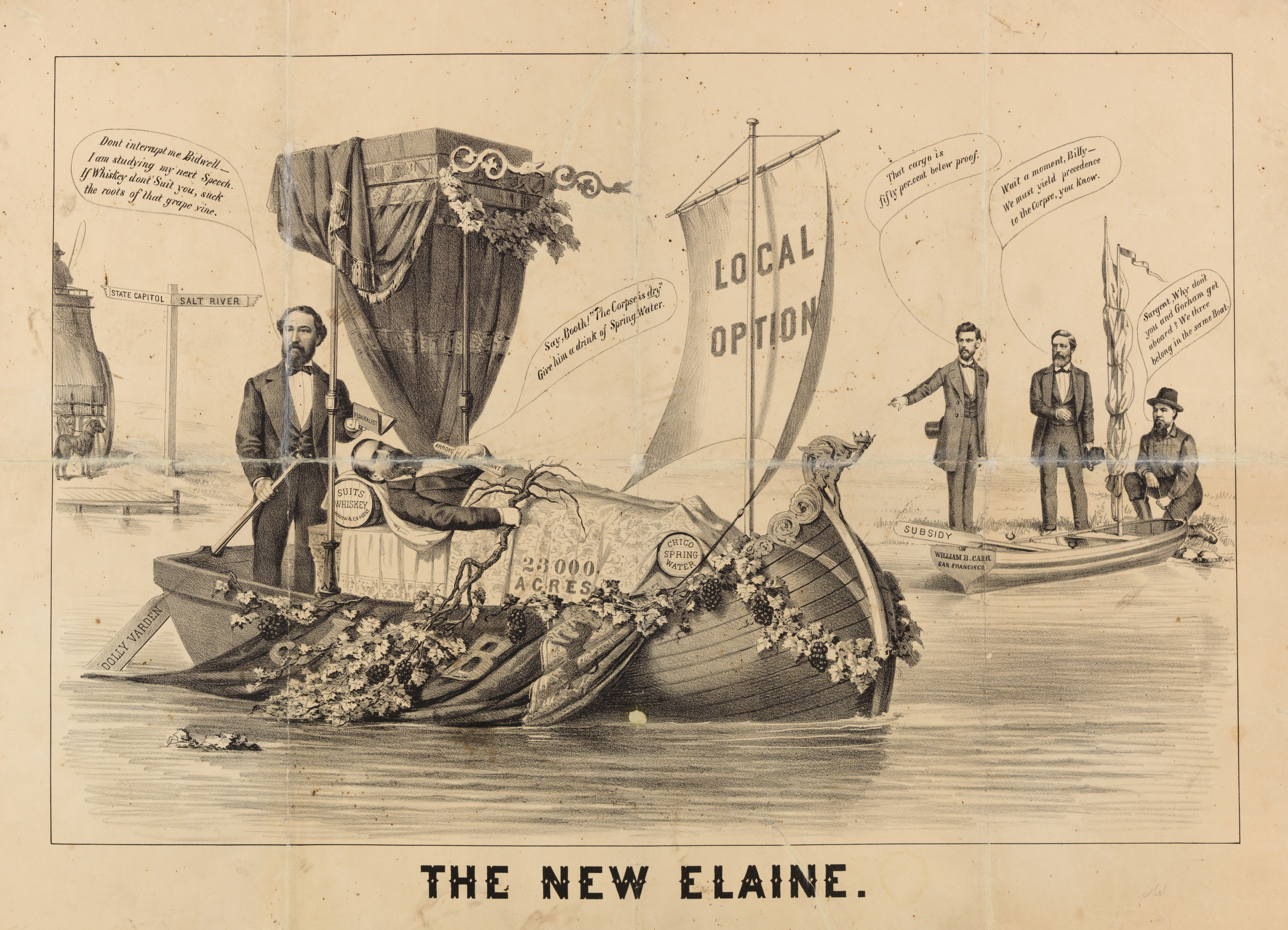
An early political caricature poster mocking California Republicans' support of a local option for alcohol, c. 1870s

Bidwell was selected as a delegate to the 1849 California Constitutional Convention, but did not attend because of mining business. Later that year, he was elected to the California State Senate, serving a single one-year term. He ran for State Senate again in 1855, but lost to incumbent Know Nothing John B. McGee by just 187 votes. He supervised conducting the federal census of California in 1850 and 1860, under national direction by Joseph C. G. Kennedy. Bidwell was a delegate to the 1860 Democratic National Convention in Charleston. He was the only West Coast delegate opposed to secession. He left the party soon after the outbreak of the Civil War, and in 1864 was a delegate to the National Union National Convention.

=== Congress ===
That year, he was also elected to the House of Representatives as a Republican, serving from 1865 to 1867.

Rather than seek re-election, he chose to run for Governor of California in 1867, but due to his anti-monopoly stance lost the Union Party nomination to circuit court clerk and railroad lobbyist George Congdon Gorham by a vote of 167 to 132.

=== Later campaigns ===
In 1875, Bidwell ran for Governor of California on the Anti-Monopoly Party ticket. As a strong advocate of the temperance movement, he presided over the state convention of the Prohibition Party in 1888 and was their nominee for governor in 1890. In the 1892 presidential election, Bidwell was the nominee of the Prohibition Party. The ticket of Bidwell and James B. Cranfill of Texas finished fourth nationwide, receiving 271,058 votes, or 2.3%. It was the largest total vote and highest percentage of the vote received by any Prohibition Party national ticket. Their strongest result was in Minnesota, where they received over five percent of the vote.

== Death ==
John Bidwell's autobiography, Echoes of the Past, was published in 1900. That same year, on April 4, Bidwell died of natural causes at the age of 80.

== Personal life ==
Annie and John Bidwell, 1895

In 1868 Bidwell was about 49 when he married Annie Kennedy, whom he had courted for years. She was 20 years younger and a daughter of Joseph C. G. Kennedy. Her father was socially prominent, a high-ranking Washington official who supervised the U.S. Census Bureau. Bidwell had met him while working on the California census. The senior Kennedy was active in the U.S. Whig party. Annie Kennedy was deeply religious, joining the Presbyterian Church, and committed to a number of moral and social causes. She was very active in the suffrage and prohibition movements.

The couple married April 16, 1868, in Washington, D.C., with President Andrew Johnson and future president Ulysses S. Grant among the guests. After he returned with her to Chico, the Bidwells used their mansion extensively for entertainment of friends and official guests. Among them were President Rutherford B. Hayes, General William T. Sherman, Susan B. Anthony, Frances Willard, Governor Leland Stanford, John Muir, Joseph Dalton Hooker, and Asa Gray.

== Legacy ==
The Bidwell Family Papers are held at the Bancroft Library.

The actor Howard Negley (1898–1983) played Bidwell in the 1953 episode, "The Lady with the Blue Silk Umbrella" on the syndicated television anthology series, Death Valley Days, hosted by Stanley Andrews. In the story line, Helen Crosby (Kathleen Case) carries official California statehood papers in her umbrella to shield them from ruffians who want to destroy the documents. Rick Vallin played Lieutenant Bob Hastings.

== Fraternal allegiance ==
Bidwell was a Freemason for a time but left the group. He said that allegiance to the fraternity "was pointless" in an October 17, 1867, letter to Annie Kennedy, whom he had been courting. His signature appears in the Book of By-Laws of the Chico-Leland Stanford Lodge No. 111 in Chico, California.

== Gallery ==
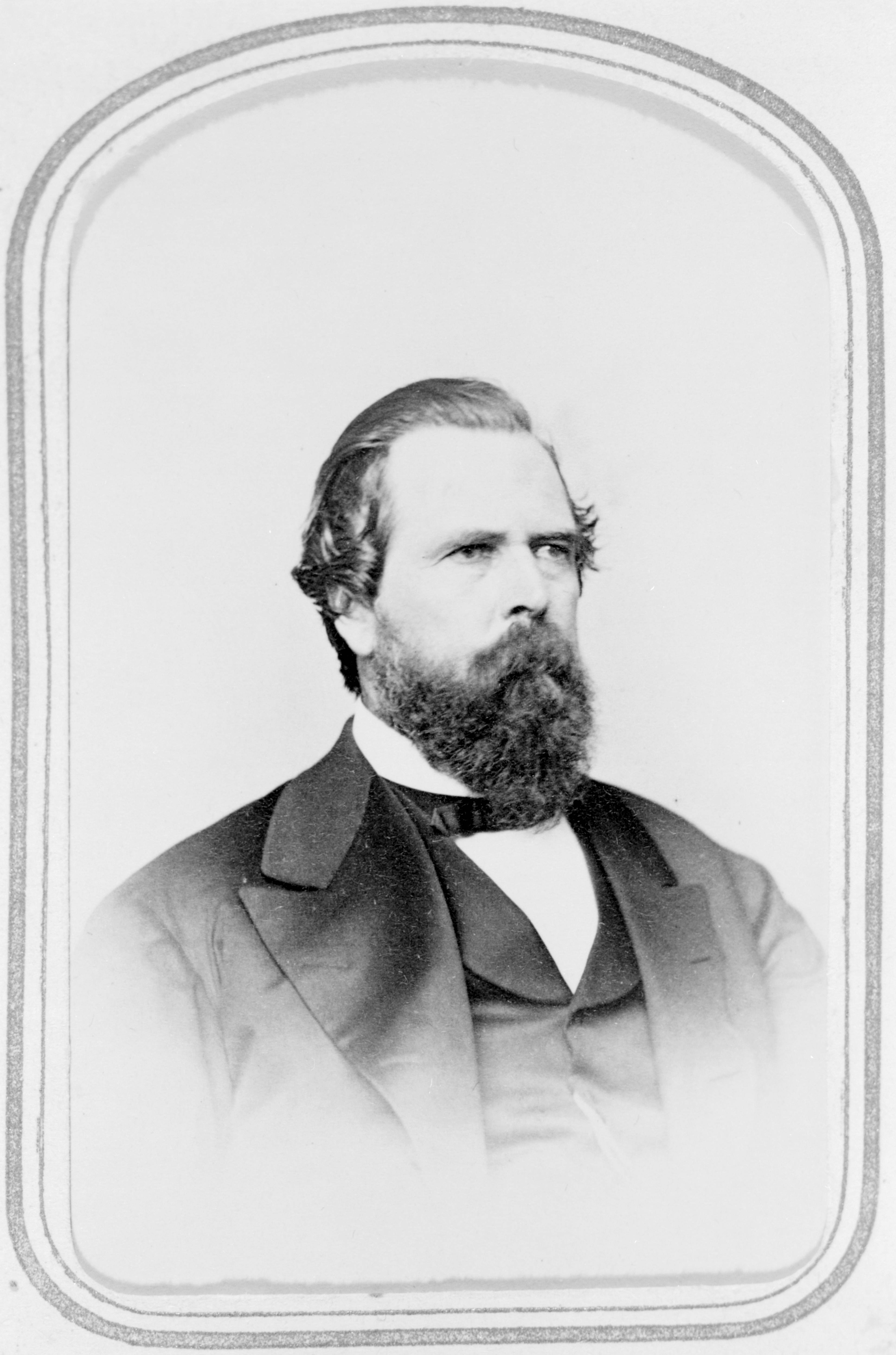
Bidwell in 1866

Bidwell in 1872

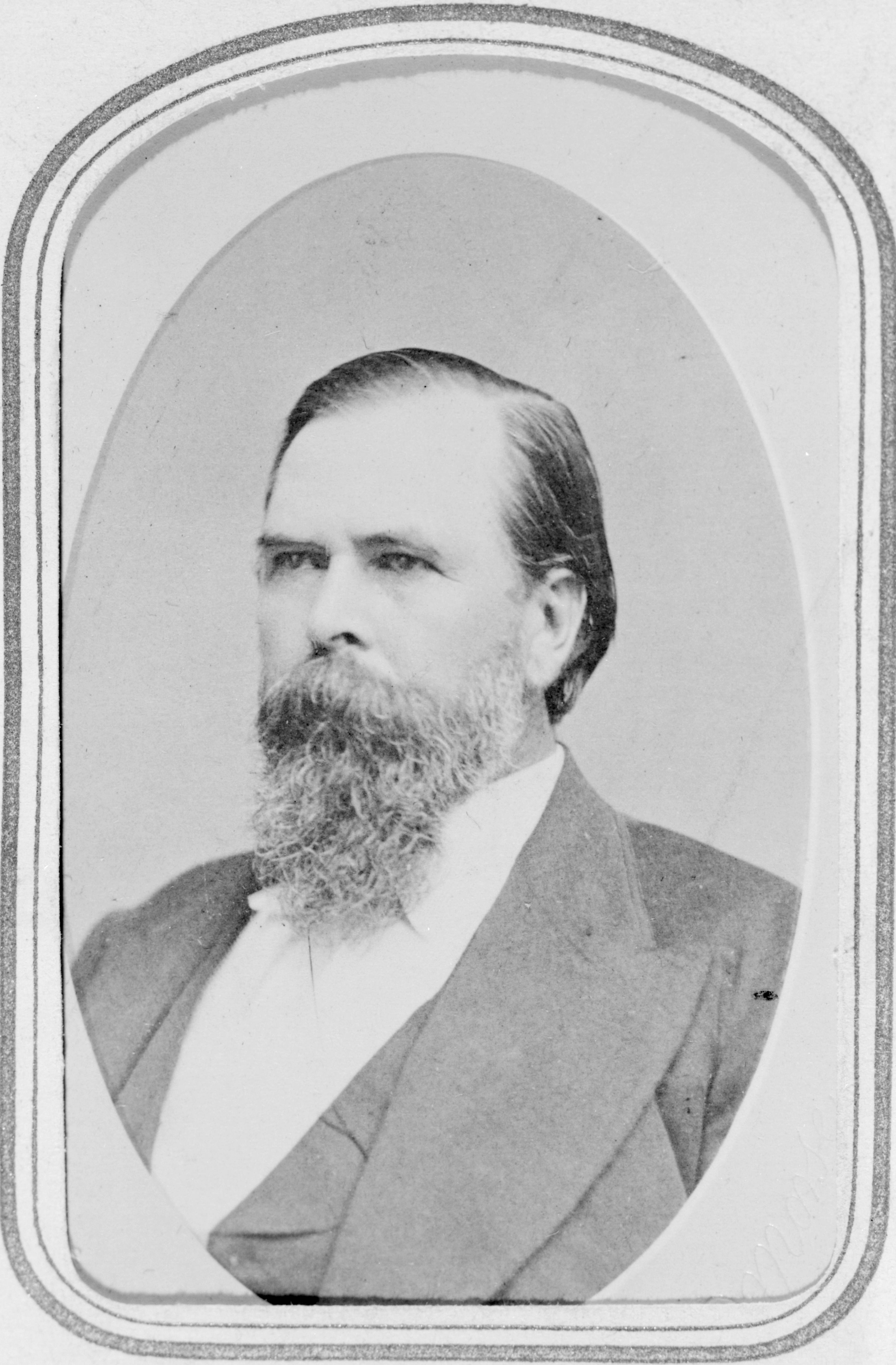
Bidwell in 1876

Bidwell in 1880

Bidwell in 1891

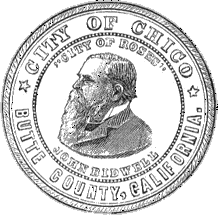
Seal of Chico, California

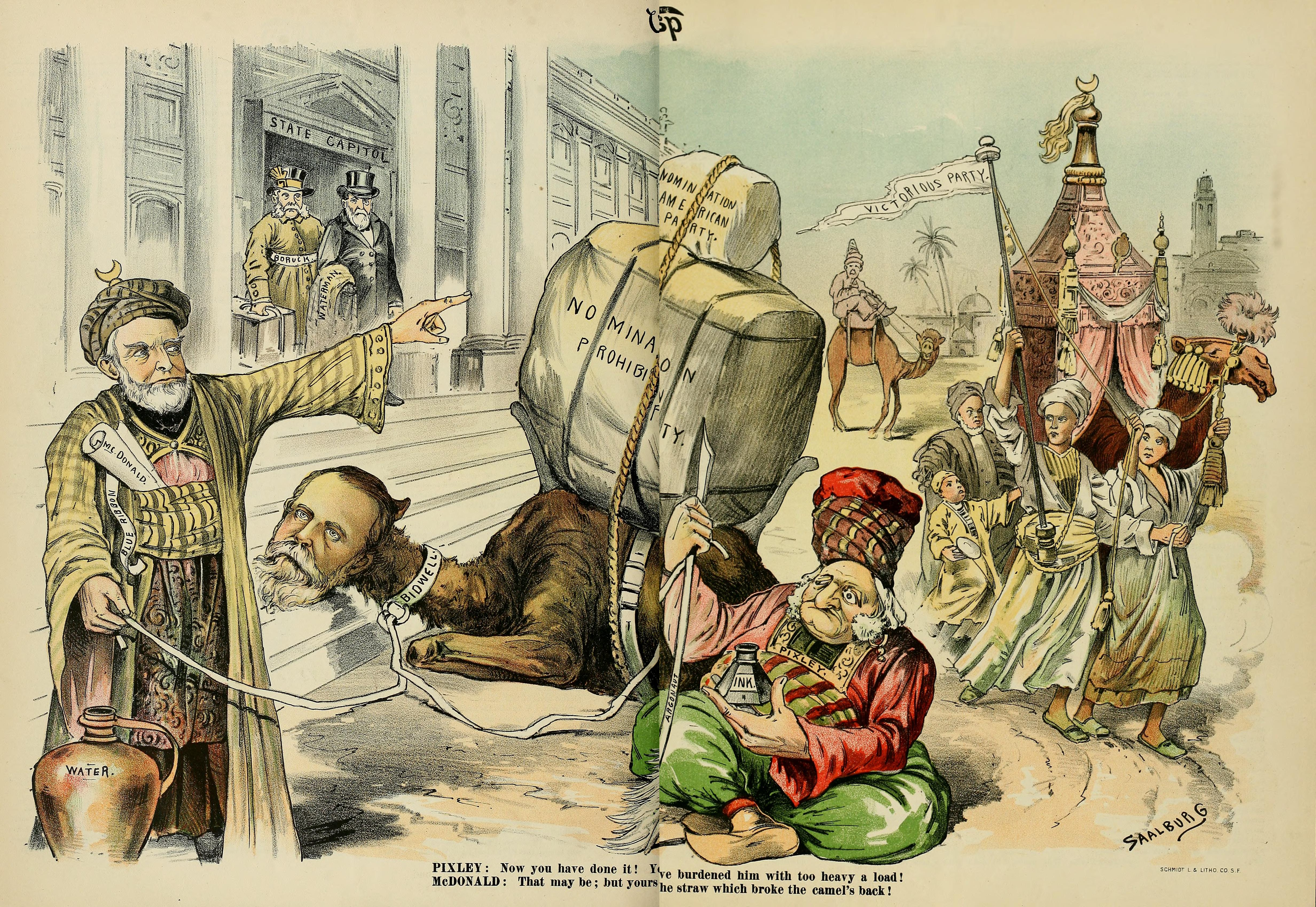
"Now you have done it!"

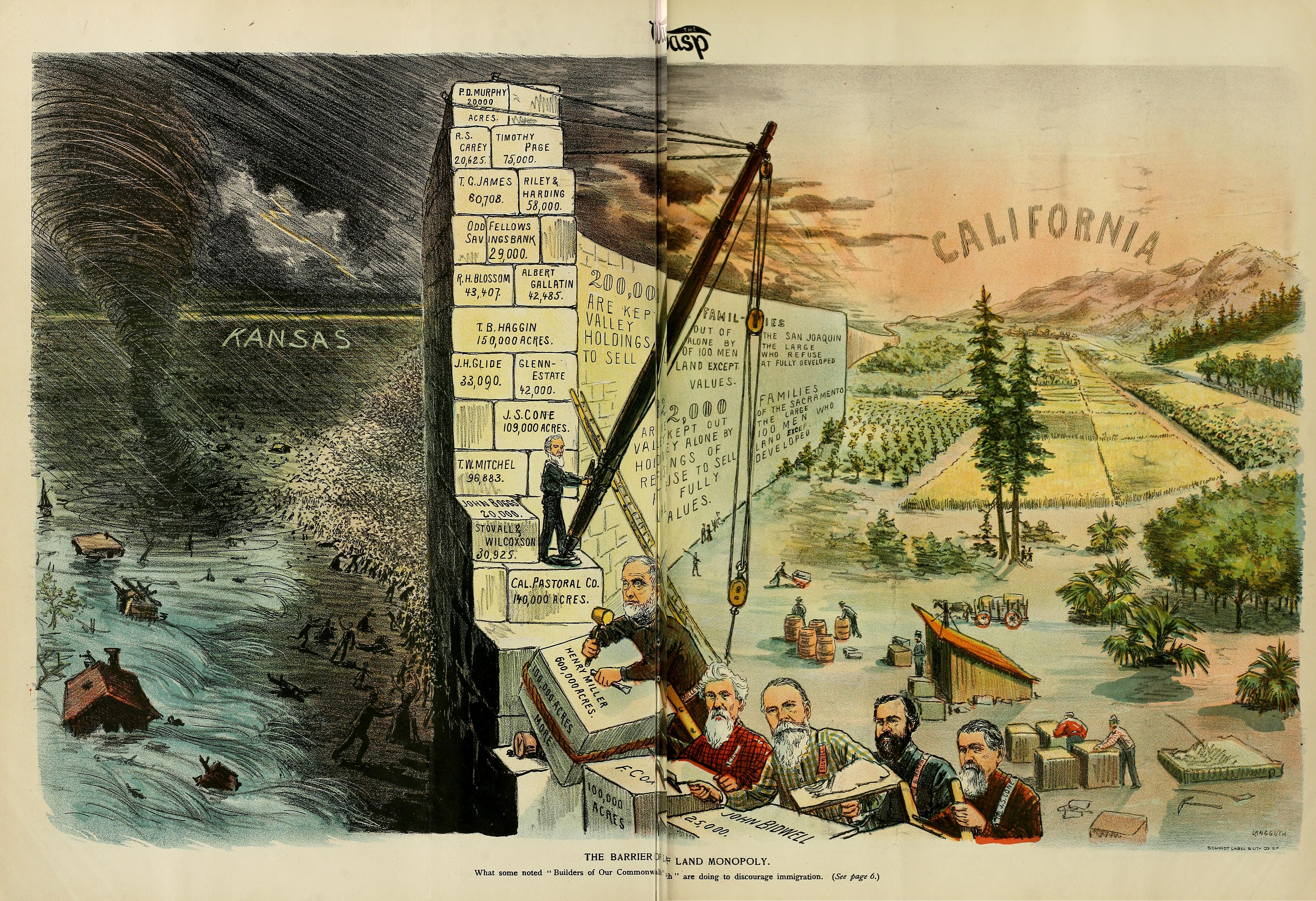
"The Barrier of Land Monopoly"

== Electoral history ==
1864 United States House of Representatives elections in California, District 3
Party	Candidate	Votes	%
Republican	John Bidwell	18,255	56.1
Democratic	Jack Temple	14,273	43.9
Total votes		32,528	100.0
Republican hold			

== See also ==
- Bartleson–Bidwell Party
- California Republic
- Bidwell Mansion State Historic Park
- California Trail
- Michael Gillis
- Temperance movement
- List of people associated with the California Gold Rush

California Senate
New constituency	Member of the California Senate from the Sacramento district 1849–1851	Succeeded by Alonzo W. Adams
U.S. House of Representatives
New constituency	Member of the U.S. House of Representatives from California's 3rd congressional district 1865–1867	Succeeded by James Johnson
Preceded by Brutus J. Clay	Chair of the House Agriculture Committee; 1865–1867	Succeeded by Rowland E. Trowbridge
Party political offices
Preceded by Clinton B. Fisk	Prohibition nominee for President of the United States; 1892	Succeeded by Charles Bentley; Joshua Levering
