= Robert B. Semple =

American politician and newspaperman (1806–1854)

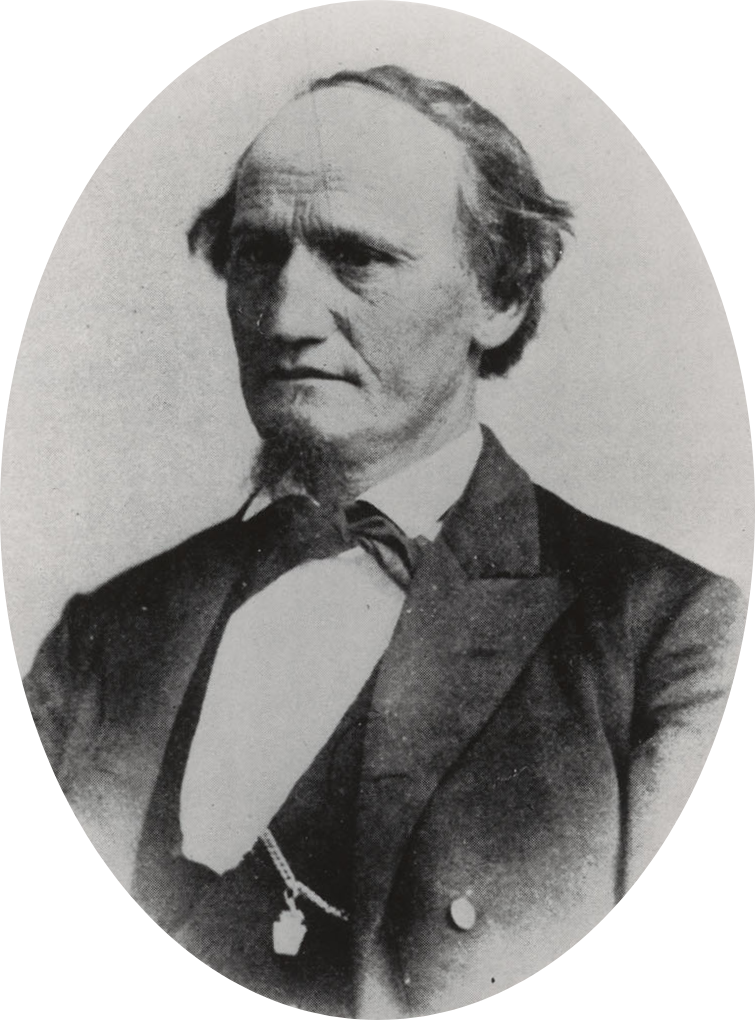
Robert Baylor Semple

Robert Baylor Semple (1806–1854) was a 19th-century California newspaperman and politician.

== Biography ==
A newspaperman in Kentucky, he came west over the California Trail with Lansford Hastings in 1845, before the gold rush. During the 1846 Bear Flag Revolt, he led the Americans around Sutter's Fort in the Sacramento valley. With Walter Colton, he published the Monterey-based Californian on August 15, 1846, the first newspaper ever published in California. Semple moved the newspaper to San Francisco in 1847. In late 1848 it was merged with the California Star, founded by Samuel Brannan, and became the Alta California. In 1849, he was joined in California by his brother Charles and was elected to and presided over California's state constitutional convention — California's first two Senate seats.

In 1847, with Thomas O. Larkin, he received a grant of land from Mariano Vallejo along the Carquinez Strait near the mouth of the Sacramento River provided that a new town be erected there named for Vallejo's wife Francisca Benicia. "Francisca" was objected to by the citizens of Yerba Buena, which had recently been renamed San Francisco by its occupying American alcalde Washington Allon Bartlett: The city became Benicia instead. During the gold rush of 1849 he operated a ferry service from San Francisco to the East Bay. Falling out with Larkin after Benicia was named California's territorial capital, Semple retired in 1851 to the northern tract of the Rancho Jimeno, which abutted his brother's Rancho Colus. He later died from injuries received falling from a horse.
