= Albert S. Evans =

Colonel Albert S. Evans
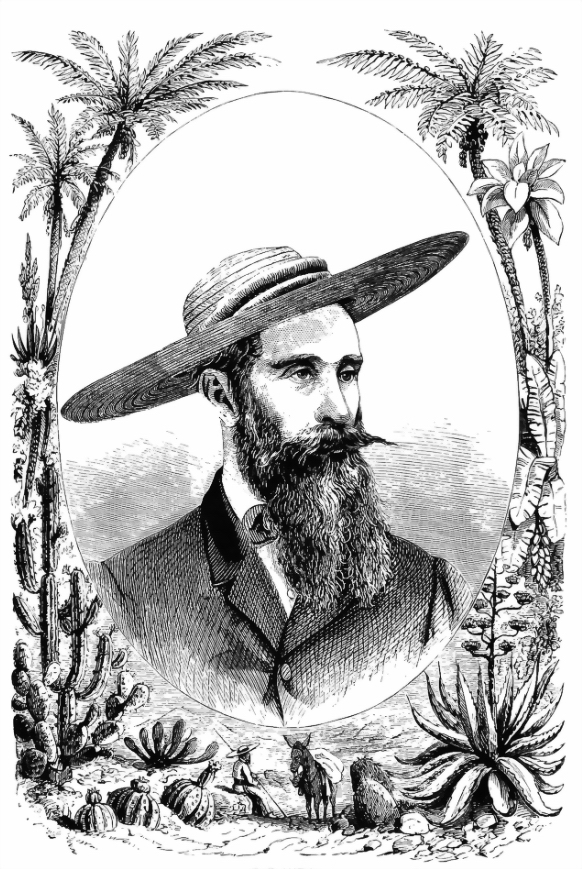
- Colonel Albert S. Evans, from A La California
- Died: 22 October 1872
- Writing career
- Pen name: Fitz Smythe

Albert S. Evans was an American explorer and writer. Prior to 1856, he lived in Pittsburgh, Pennsylvania and worked as a broker. He lived in Chicago and worked for many years at the Daily Journal. Evans arrived in San Francisco in 1861, began working as a journalist for the Morning Call and served on the staff of the Governor of California during the Civil War.

He published two travelogues, Our Sister Republic: A Gala Trip through Tropical Mexico in 1869 - 1870, (1870) and Á La California: Sketches of Life in the Golden State (1873). The books were published by A. L. Bancroft of San Francisco, the publishing partner and brother of Hubert Howe Bancroft. In 1863, Evans became local editor for some years of The Daily Alta California in San Francisco, and continued in that capacity for several years. He lived in the city for 12 years, and he famously feuded with Mark Twain when both were in the city. Evans died 22 October 1872, a passenger on the steamship Missouri, when it burned at sea.
