= A. H. Chapman House =

Historic house in California, United States

- U.S. National Register of Historic Places
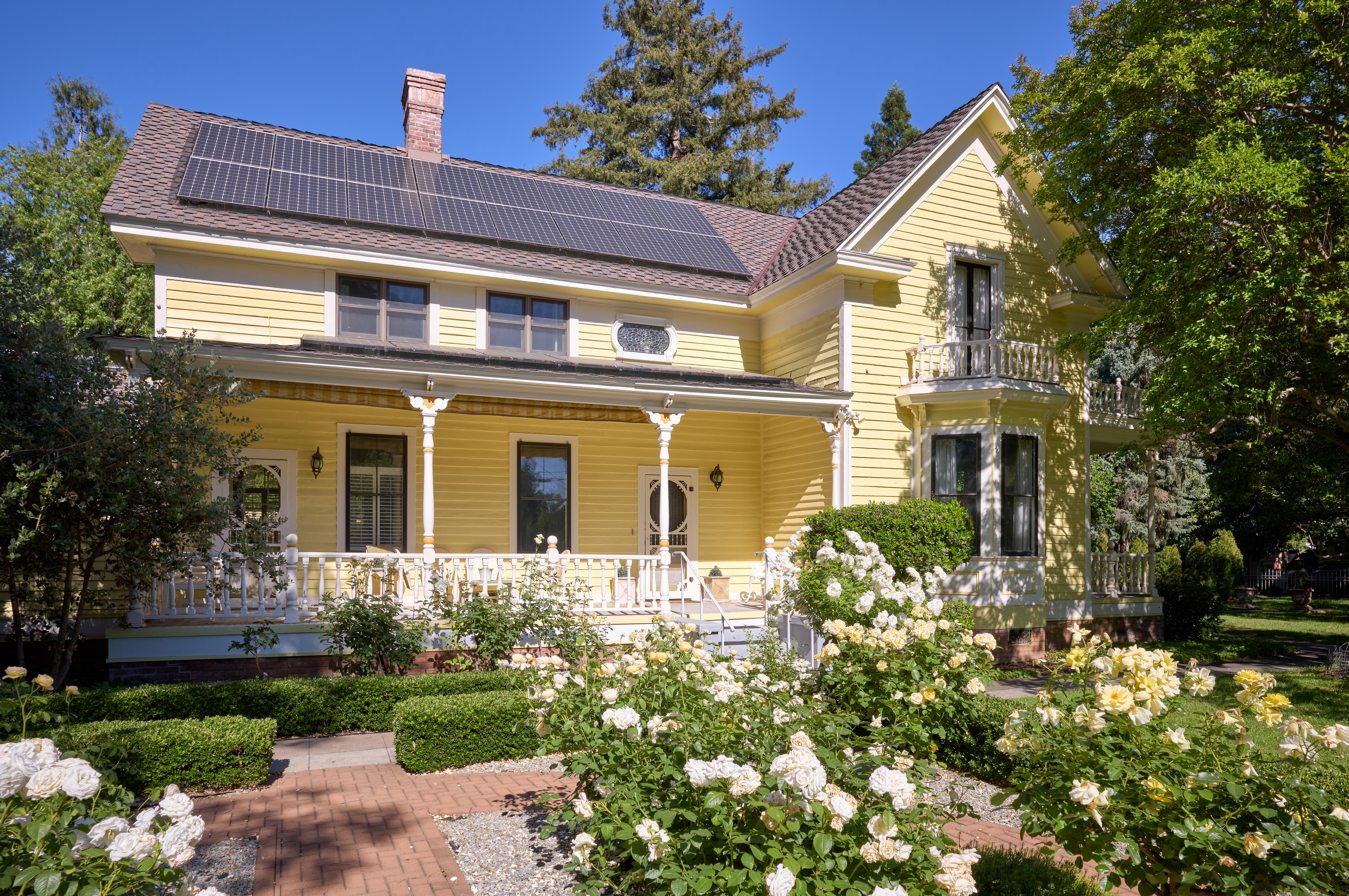
- Little Chapman Mansion in 2025

- Location within California Location within the United States
- Location: 256 E. 12th St., Chico, California
- Coordinates: 39°43′30″N 121°49′48″W
- Area: less than one acre
- Built: 1859
- Architect: Cleaveland, Henry W.; Walker, Cleveland
- Architectural style: Greek Revival, Gothic Revival
- NRHP reference No.: 82002170
- Added to NRHP: January 28, 1982

The A. H. Chapman House at 256 E. 12th St. in Chico, California was built in 1859. It has also been known as "Little Chapman Mansion". It was listed on the National Register of Historic Places in 1982.

It corresponds to a published house plan designed by architect Andrew Jackson Downing. It is likely that it was specifically designed by architect Henry W. Cleaveland, known to be a "disciple" of Downing and known to have been "working in Chico in the 1870s when the house was twice expanded to its present form."
