= Samuel Brannan =

American politician (1819–1889)

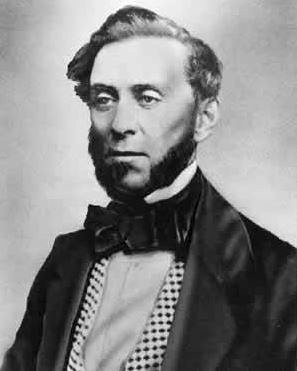
- Samuel Brannan
- Born: March 2, 1819; Saco, Massachusetts (District of Maine), United States
- Died: May 5, 1889 (aged 70); Escondido, California, United States
- Resting place: Mount Hope Cemetery, San Diego, California, United States
- Spouses: Harriet ("Hattie") Hatch; Anna Eliza Corwin
- Children: 4

Samuel Brannan (March 2, 1819 – May 5, 1889) was an American settler, businessman, journalist, and prominent member of the church of Jesus Christ of Latter Day Saints who founded the California Star, the first newspaper in San Francisco, California. He is also considered the first to publicize the California Gold Rush and was California's first millionaire. He used the profits from his stores to buy large tracts of real estate. He helped form the first vigilance committee in San Francisco and was disfellowshiped from the Church of Jesus Christ of Latter-day Saints (LDS Church) because of his actions within the vigilance committee. Brannan's wife divorced him, requiring him to liquidate much of his real estate to pay her half of their shared assets. He died poor and in relative obscurity.

== Early life ==
Brannan was born in Saco, Massachusetts (now Maine), to Thomas and Sara Emery Brannan. In order to escape his abusive father, Brannan moved with his sister (Mary Ann) and her husband (Alexander) to Painesville, Ohio, when he was fourteen years old. It was there that Brannan learned the printer's trade. During their journey to Ohio, the trio found themselves listening to two men whom they would later know as Orson Hyde and Heber C. Kimball. Brannan's brother-in-law bought a copy of the Book of Mormon from these street corner missionaries. In the neighboring town of Kirtland, Ohio, Brannan, Alexander, and Mary Ann all joined the Church of Jesus Christ of Latter Day Saints in 1842. After his father's death, Brannan inherited a decent sum of money, bought himself out of his last year of his apprenticeship, and invested the rest in a patch of land near Cleveland. Soon after making his investment, the market crashed and his land became worthless. He made a quick visit to Maine in order to see his ailing mother and then made his way to New Orleans where his brother Thomas was living. The Brannan brothers bought a press and type with what little money they had, but Thomas was taken by yellow fever shortly thereafter. After this tragedy, Brannan made his way back to the North, stopping in Indianapolis to promote a paper which ultimately failed, before he returned to Painesville.

=== Early Service in the Church ===
Once Brannan had returned to his sister's house, he renewed his religious convictions in the church and was called by the apostle Wilford Woodruff to serve a local mission in Ohio. Before being called as a missionary he had married Harriet ("Hattie") Hatch and they were expecting their first child. His mission ended early when he caught malaria and had to return home for his health. Once he had sufficiently recovered he was again called to help the church, but this time as a printer in Connecticut working alongside the apostle William Smith. While waiting in Connecticut to meet up with Smith, Brannan fell in love with Ann Eliza Corwin, whose mother took care of the visitors in the local boarding house. Brannan planned to marry her and separate from his first wife. They were eventually married although it was said that Brannan had never officially divorced his first wife. They had four children together.

From Connecticut they went to New York City, New York, in 1844, and started to print The Prophet (later The New-York Messenger), a Latter Day Saint newspaper. Shortly after the paper began, news spread that the prophet Joseph Smith and his brother Hyrum were murdered and Brigham Young had taken over the position as prophet. Brannan worked closely with Smith's blood brother William and advocated for William to take his "rightful place" as prophet. After word of Brannan and Smith's opposition reached Nauvoo, both men were disfellowshipped from the church. A year later, Brannan went to the Quorum of the Twelve Apostles, leaders of the LDS Church, pleading for reinstatement as a member of the church; it was granted in May 1845.

== Travel to California ==
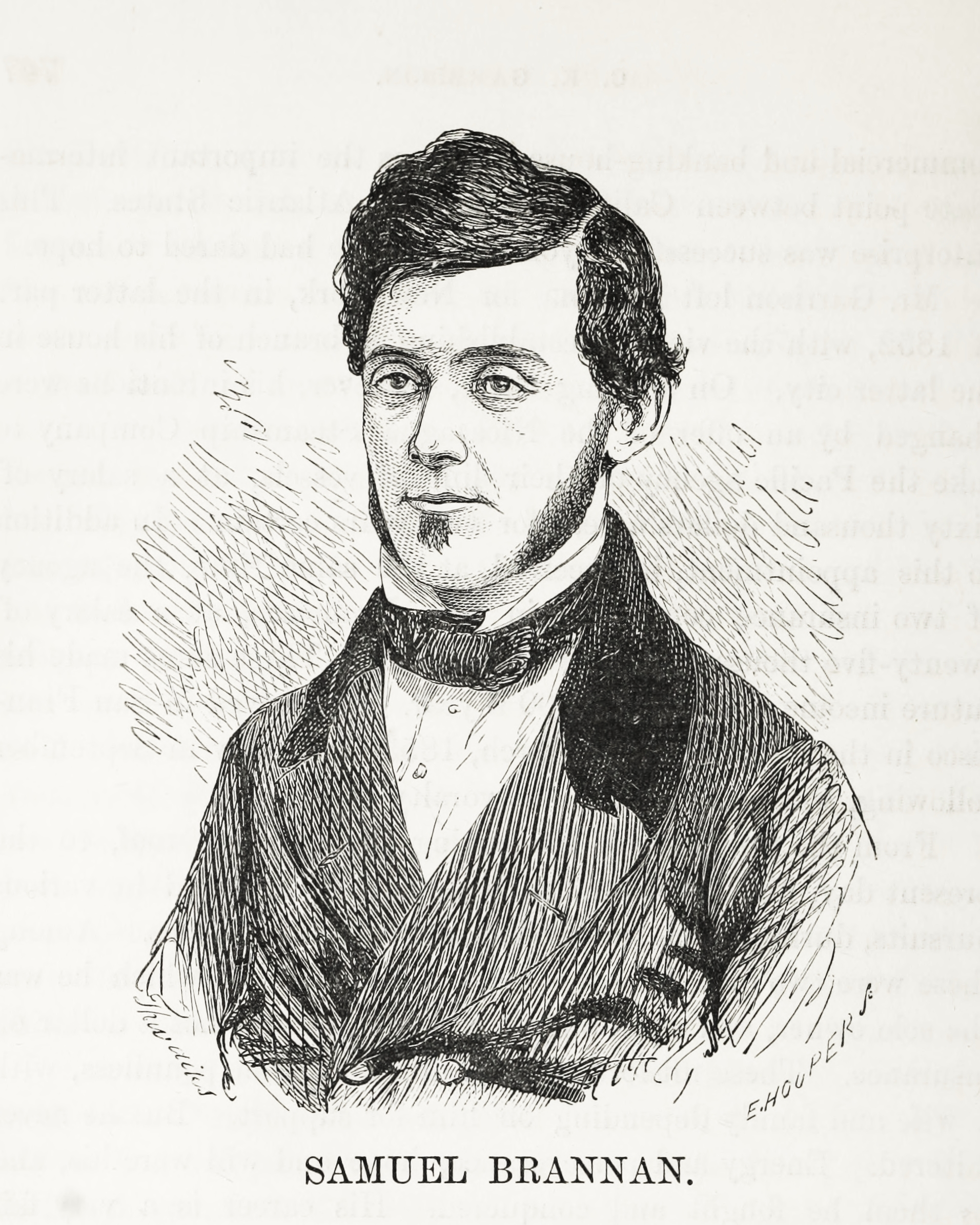
Samuel Brannan

After the assassination of their leader, the Prophet Joseph Smith, rising hostilities, attacks on their homes and religious persecution, in the east, the Mormons decided to relocate their center from Nauvoo, Illinois, to the western region outside of the United States border. The plans for the large exodus began and Mormon leadership moved westward, leaving Brannan the highest ranking religious leader in New York. As such, he was faced with the large responsibility of evacuating the eastern Mormons to California. Brannan chartered the ship Brooklyn and persuaded the Mormons of New York to join the expedition to California. The Brooklyn set sail for upper California via Cape Horn in January 1846. Brannan was in charge of the expedition and the highest presiding religious leader on the ship. He brought along an antiquated printing press and a complete flour mill to make colonization easier. While the living conditions aboard the Brooklyn were strenuous for many, Brannan lived lavishly in the ship's officers' quarters. The ship stopped on June 20, 1846, in Honolulu, Hawaii, to resupply and be inspected by Commodore Stockton. Brannan expected the inspection to go badly but instead Commodore Stockton spoke to Brannan about the United States' planned assault of the Mexicans at Monterey. This information along with Commodore Stockton's quiet encouragement led Samuel Brannan to the idea of taking the Mexican port town of Yerba Buena. Brannan's dreams of religious freedom and success were underway and after leaving Hawaii, the Brooklyn changed routes, landing on July 31, 1846, at Yerba Buena. Upon arrival they were met by Commander John B. Montgomery and the Portsmouth, who had taken Yerba Buena only a few days before, much to Brannan's dismay. The Mormons began settling into the area (present-day San Francisco) and tripled the population of the pueblo.

== California career ==
After settling in Yerba Buena, Brannan consulted with natives who were familiar with the region and decided that the land down by the Sacramento River, which they named "New Hope", would be the next Nauvoo of the Mormons, but with real refuge and religious freedom. After disputes between members over land and other affairs, the city of "New Hope" quickly failed. Brannan is often credited to have been the first to perform certain actions in the region: a non-Catholic wedding ceremony, the first to preach in English, and the first to set up a California public school and a flour mill.

Brannan used his press to establish the California Star as the first newspaper in San Francisco, which released its first formal issue on January 9, 1847. It was the second paper in California, following The Californian founded in Monterey and first published on August 15, 1846. The two joined to become The Daily Alta California in 1848 after Brannan sold the paper to a colleague.

In June 1847, Brannan traveled overland to Green River, Wyoming, to meet with Brigham Young, the head of the Church of Jesus Christ of Latter-day Saints, who was leading the first contingent of Mormon pioneers across the plains to the Great Basin region. Brannan urged Young to bring the Mormon pioneers to California as was previously planned, but Young rejected the proposal in favor of settling in what is present-day Utah. Brannan returned to northern California frustrated with how the meeting had gone. Being the only church leader of that region, Brannan continued to receive tithes of the church members, but no records have been found showing that those tithes were forwarded to the leaders of the church in Utah. Many members stopped paying him and began making their way eastward toward Salt Lake Valley.

=== California Gold Rush ===
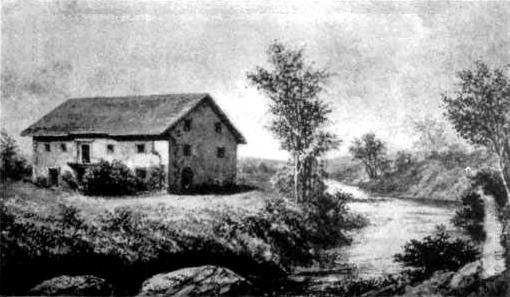
Brannan's Store, Sutter's Fort

In 1847, Brannan opened a store at Sutter's Fort, in present-day Sacramento, California. During that time he also built many large buildings in both Sacramento and San Francisco. Early in 1848, employees of John Sutter paid for goods in Brannan's store with gold they had found at Sutter's Mill, near Coloma, California, by employees of James W. Marshall, who was managing Sutter's sawmill. Some of his employees had been in the Mormon Battalion, and he later found the deceased of the Donner Party. Brannan's California Star paper could not publish the news of the gold strike, as the staff had left in a rush for the gold fields. Yet he owned the only store between San Francisco and the gold fields — a fact he capitalized on by buying up all the picks, shovels and pans he could find, and then running up and down the streets of San Francisco, shouting 'Gold! Gold on the American River!' He purchased pans for 20 cents each and resold them for $15 each, making $36,000 in nine weeks

=== San Francisco and Sacramento ===
In 1848, Brannan decided that he was going to use all of his resources in order to help build up California and its connection with the east. He planned on building that connection through the California Star Express, which would deliver mail from San Francisco to Independence, Missouri, and had its first route on April 1, 1848. Brannan had opened more stores to sell goods to the miners (his Sutter Fort store sold US$150,000 a month in 1849), and began buying land in San Francisco. He also acquired all of the remaining assets of the failed "New Hope" project and like many other Mormons at this time, found his focus had turned from LDS Church affairs to monetary gains.

Using his profits and possibly the proceeds of tithing paid to him as an LDS Church representative, Brannan bought land from Sutter in the Sacramento area. Around this same time Brannan established ship trade with China, Hawaii, and the east coast. His land holdings extended to southern California and to Hawaii where, in 1851, he visited and purchased large amounts of land in Honolulu. He and other landowners and speculators raised the price of Californian land considerably, angering many. The disagreement escalated during 1850 into the Squatters' Riot, during which the squatters' spokesman, Doctor Charles L. Robinson, was shot, along with others. Nine people were killed. Brannan was considered the instigator of the incident.

In a few accounts of Brannan's dealings with the LDS Church it is said that Brigham Young sent the apostle Amasa Lyman to collect the tithing money that Brannan had withheld from the church's institution. When Lyman arrived, Brannan was unable to account for the tithes that Brigham Young and other Mormons claimed were given to him or that he owed from his own personal income. He reportedly told them, "You go back and tell Brigham Young that I'll give up the Lord's money when he sends me a receipt signed by the Lord", although historians, such as Will Bagley, have found that this is likely just legend. In another account, Lyman was sent to gather $10,000 of owed tithing from Brannan (or more if he was willing). After a couple of visits all of Brannan's debts to the LDS Church were considered to be paid in full.

Even with many financial upsets, Brannan became California's first millionaire. Brannan was elected to the first town council of San Francisco in the new U.S. territory. In 1851, after a series of sensational crimes in the area, he helped organize and was the first president of the San Francisco Committee of Vigilance, which functioned as a de facto police force with a propensity for hanging. In 1853, he was elected as a Senator to the California State Senate in the new state's capital of Sacramento. By this time California had become part of the United States and had gained statehood in 1850.

In order to continue the settlement of the west, Brannan purchased California's first steam locomotive in an effort to hasten the building of the first western railroad. He also teamed up with other local capitalists to construct the first wharf in San Francisco. Around this same time, Brannan made known his feelings about slavery and spoke out against it.

On July 11, 1851, Parley P. Pratt and his mission companions ventured to San Francisco to establish the Pacific Mission of the LDS Church. The action Brannan took as a leader of the Vigilantes in 1851 was heavily frowned upon by the Mormons. On August 25, 1851, he was disfellowshipped from the LDS Church for "a general course of unchristianlike conduct, neglect of duty, and for combining with lawless assemblies to commit murder and other crimes."

Anecdotes claim that in 1858, Brannan paid $1,500 (~$43,379 in 2025) for lumber salvaged from a ship that foundered in waters near San Francisco, and on the basalt the headlands of the San Francisco Peninsula overlooking the mouth of the Golden Gate. The story further claims that he used the material to build the first Cliff House, which is a popular restaurant and recreational area. There is no historical evidence to support this claim.

=== Calistoga ===
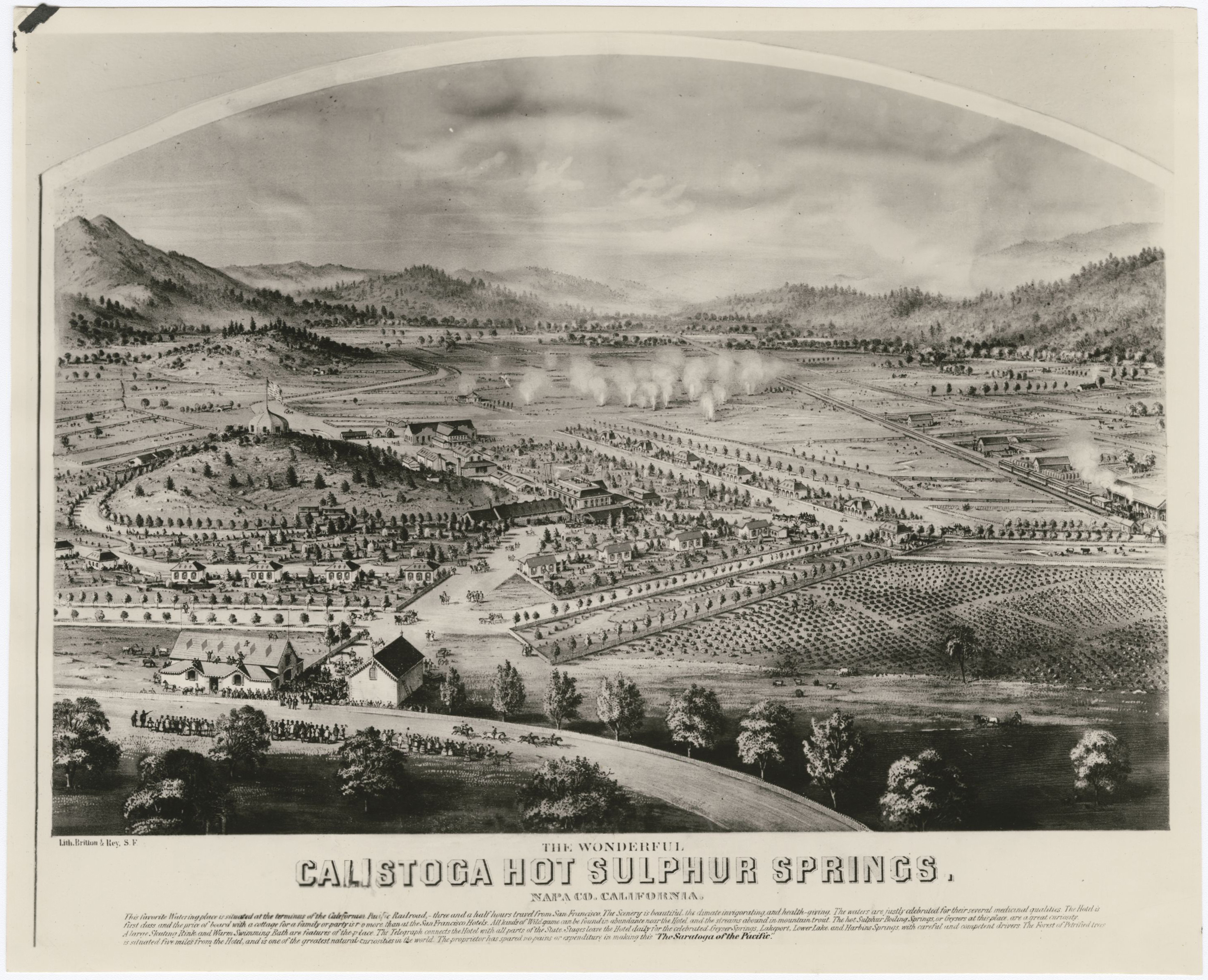
Calistoga Hot Sulphur Springs. Napa Co. California

After Brannan visited the hot springs in the upper Napa Valley in 1859, he planned a new resort for the area. He bought land containing the springs in the northern portion of the Rancho Carne Humana in 1861 and founded the town of Calistoga, said to be a combination of the words "California" and then-fashionable Saratoga Springs in New York. Brannan also founded the Napa Valley Railroad in 1864 in order to provide tourists with an easier way to reach Calistoga from the San Francisco Bay ferry boats that docked in the lower Napa Valley at Vallejo. The railroad was later sold at a foreclosure sale in Napa County in 1869. Many poorer Calistoga residents were angered by Brannan's take-over of the region. At one point the opposition was so intense that Brannan was shot eight times. Brannan survived, but used a cane for the rest of his life.

In 1870, Anna Eliza Corwin divorced Brannan. They had grown apart as Eliza lived in Europe for quite some time while Brannan remained in California. In the aftermath of the divorce, the judge ruled that his wife was entitled to half of their holdings in cash. The majority of Brannan's holdings were in real estate and he had to liquidate the properties to pay the full divorce settlement.

== Later years, death, and legacy ==
Following the divorce, he became a brewer and developed a problem with alcohol. Leaving San Francisco, the city he helped develop, he moved south to Mexico. Brannan set up a small ranch near the Mexican border in the state of Sonora. This is where his newly acquired tract of land was located, which was given to him in 1880 by President Benito Juárez and the Mexican government after helping them expel unwanted Frenchmen from Mexican lands. In 1888, at the age of 69, he was paid the sum of $49,000 in interest from the Mexican government. Brannan traveled to San Francisco to pay his debts. He quit drinking and settled all his debts, but he died without sufficient funds to pay for his own funeral. Brannan died at age 70 in Escondido, California, Sunday, May 5, 1889, from inflammation of the bowels. Brannan's body lay unclaimed in the San Diego County receiving vault for over a year until it was recognized by chance. He was given a Christian burial and for many years, only a stake marked his grave. He is interred at Mount Hope Cemetery.

=== Legacy ===
American historian Hubert Howe Bancroft described Samuel Brannan's achievements saying:

He probably did more for San Francisco and for other places than was effected by the combined efforts of scores of better men; and indeed, in many respects he was not a "bad man", being as a rule straightforward as well as shrewd in his dealings, as famous for his acts of charity and open-handed liberality as for in enterprise, giving also frequent proofs of personal bravery.

His other legacies included:

- Brannan Street in San Francisco was named after Samuel Brannan.
- California cities that claim Brannan as their founder include Calistoga and Yuba City.
- In partnership with John Augustus Sutter, Jr. and with William Tecumseh Sherman and Edward Ord as surveyors, Brannan laid out the unofficial subdivisions that became the city of Sacramento.
- Author of the forever known shout, "Gold! Gold! Gold! Gold from the American River!"
- Posthumous induction into the California Newspaper Hall of Fame in 1958.

== See also ==
- Etymologies of place names in San Francisco
- History of San Francisco
- Napa Valley Wine Train
- Sam Brannan House
- List of people associated with the California Gold Rush

== Bibliography ==
- Bagley, Will (1997). "'Every thing is favourable! and God is on our side': Samuel Brannan and the conquest of California". Journal of Mormon History. 23 (2). Ogden, UT.: 185–209.
- Bagley, Will (1999). Scoundrel's Tale: The Samuel Brannan Papers. Spokane, WA: Arthur H. Clark. ISBN 978-0-87062-274-8. OCLC 40395893. - Also published by Utah State University Press.
- Bailey, Paul (1943). Sam Brannan and the California Mormons. Los Angeles, CA.: Westernlore Press. OCLC 1980521.
- Bringhurst, Newell G. (Summer 1997), "Samuel Brannan and His Forgotten Final Years", Southern California Quarterly, 79 (2): 139–60, doi:10.2307/41171850, JSTOR 41171850.
- Campbell, Eugene E. (April 1959), "The Apostasy of Samuel Brannan", Utah Historical Quarterly, 27 (2): 156–67, doi:10.2307/45058142, JSTOR 45058142, S2CID 254430102, archived from the original on 2011-06-14.
- Dickson, Samuel. Tales of San Francisco. Stanford: Stanford University Press, 1957.
- Luce, W. Ray (August 1968), "Samuel Brannan: Speculator in Mexican Lands", Theses and Dissertations, Master's thesis, Provo, Utah: Department of History, Brigham Young University.
- Scott, Reva Lucile Holdaway (1944), Samuel Brannan and the Golden Fleece (2nd ed.), New York: Macmillan Co., OCLC 1579749.
