= Annie Bidwell =

American pioneer, suffragist, botanist (1839–1918)

- Bidwell c. 1870s
- Born: Annie Ellicott Kennedy; June 30, 1839; Meadville, Pennsylvania, U.S.
- Died: March 9, 1918 (aged 78); Chico, California, U.S.
- Spouse: John Bidwell (m. 1868; died 1900)

Annie Kennedy Bidwell (June 30, 1839 – March 9, 1918) was a 19th-century pioneer and founder of society in the Sacramento Valley area of California. She is known for her contributions to social causes, such as women's suffrage, the temperance movement, donating parks for travelers to camp and sleep in and education. Annie Bidwell was a friend and correspondent of Susan B. Anthony, Frances Willard, and John Muir.

== Biography ==
Annie Ellicott Kennedy was born in Meadville, Pennsylvania, on June 30, 1839. she was the daughter of Joseph C. G. Kennedy, a politician in the Whig party, who served as director of the United States Census for 1850 and 1860. The Kennedy family lived in Washington, D.C., from Annie's 10th year.

She married John Bidwell on April 16, 1868, in Washington, D.C. Their wedding guests included Elizabeth Cady Stanton, President Andrew Johnson and future president Ulysses S. Grant. After their marriage, Annie returned with her new husband to his home in Chico, California.

Annie and John Bidwell, 1895

While her husband was alive, Bidwell was concerned for the future of the local Mechoopda Native Americans. She was active in state and national Indian associations. An amateur botanist, she collected the first known specimen of a small annual plant, which was named Bidwell's knotweed (Polygonum bidwelliae), after her.

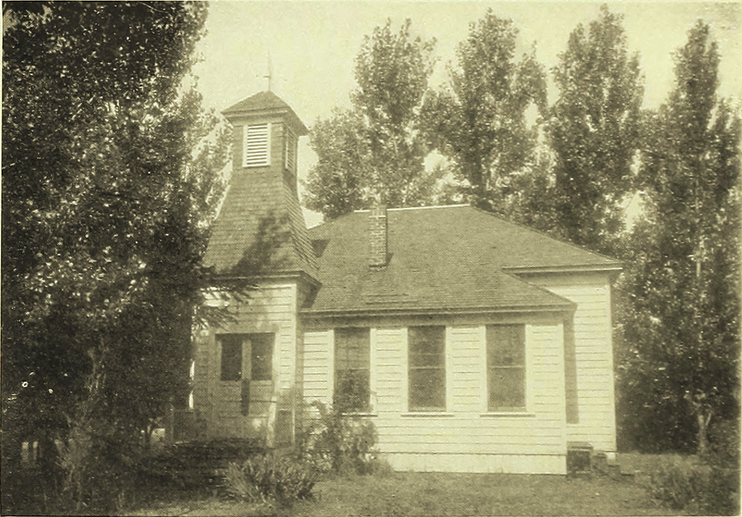
Bidwell Hall, The Annie K. Bidwell WCTU, Chico, California

After her husband's death, Bidwell continued to live in Chico, the town her late husband had founded. Before her death, she donated to the city of Chico on July 10, 1905, some 2,238 acres (almost ten square miles) of land, along with a Children's Park in downtown. Since then the land has remained in the public trust and is now known as Bidwell Park.

She died on March 9, 1918, in Chico, California.

== Legacy ==
The Bidwell Mansion in Chico was preserved as a museum and state historic park until it was severely damaged in an arson fire in December 2024. While Annie and John Bidwell resided in the mansion, they were hosts to many prominent figures of their era, including: President Rutherford B. Hayes, General William T. Sherman, Susan B. Anthony, Frances Willard, Governor Leland Stanford, John Muir, and Asa Gray.

== See also ==
- Bidwell Mansion State Historic Park
