= 1864 United States House of Representatives elections in California =

- November 8, 1864

All 3 California seats to the United States House of Representatives
	Majority party	Minority party
Party	Republican	Democratic
Last election	3	0
Seats won	3	0
Seat change	Steady	Steady
Popular vote	62,039	43,045
Percentage	59.0%	41.0%

Republican
50–60%
60–70%
Winners
Republican hold

The United States House of Representatives elections in California, 1864 were elections for California's delegation to the United States House of Representatives, which occurred as part of the general election of the House of Representatives on November 8, 1864. California's all-Republican delegation was unchanged. This was the first election in which California was divided into districts. Formerly, all three seats were elected at-large.

== Results ==
=== District 1 ===
California's 1st congressional district election, 1864
Party	Candidate	Votes	%
Republican	Donald C. McRuer	20,370	58.9
Democratic	Joseph B. Crockett	14,191	41.1
Total votes		34,561	100.0
Turnout			
Republican hold			

=== District 2 ===
California's 2nd congressional district election, 1864
Party	Candidate	Votes	%
Republican	William Higby (incumbent)	23,414	61.6
Democratic	James W. Coffroth	14,581	38.4
Total votes		37,995	100.0
Turnout			
Republican hold			

=== District 3 ===
California's 3rd congressional district election, 1864
Party	Candidate	Votes	%
Republican	John Bidwell	18,255	56.1
Democratic	Jack Temple	14,273	43.9
Total votes		32,528	100.0
Turnout			
Republican hold			

== See also ==
- 39th United States Congress
- Political party strength in California
- Political party strength in U.S. states
- United States House of Representatives elections, 1864
