= The Californian (1840s newspaper) =

First California newspaper (1846–1848)

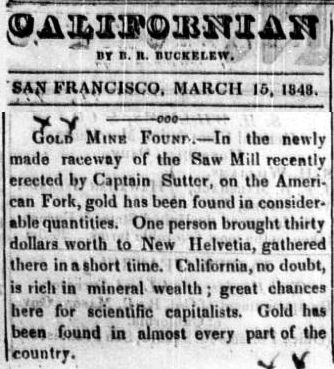
"Gold Mine Found", Californian, March 15, 1848

The Californian was the first California newspaper.

== History ==
The Californian was first published in Monterey, California, on August 15, 1846, by Alcalde Walter Colton and his friend Robert B. Semple, from a well-used Ramage printing press that Agustín V. Zamorano brought from Hawaii to Monterey in 1834. Zamorano used it to print books, letterheads and proclamations, but not a newspaper. When Commodore Robert F. Stockton arrived in Monterey with the American naval invasion in July 1846, he found the printing press stored in the Custom House and notified Colton.

The paper Colton and Semple printed on was cigarette paper, the only kind available in quantity. The single-sheet publication was printed on a series of 11.75 by 10.25 in (30 by 26 cm) sheets, with English on one side and Spanish on the other. The biggest news item in the first edition was the United States declaring war on Mexico. On October 3, 1846, The Californian printed the first poem published in a California periodical, entitled "On Leaving the United States for California". The next issue carried the poetical rejoinder "On Leaving California for the United States". Both poems were unsigned, but were probably the same author.

The Californian moved to Yerba Buena, as San Francisco was then called, in mid-1847. The city was about to undergo rapid changes as the California gold rush got underway. The newspaper did not report about the discovery of gold because word spread so quickly from person to person. The Californian was forced to shut down May 29, 1848, because its entire staff had departed for the gold fields. Its rival newspaper, the California Star run by Mormon Samuel Brannan and Edward C. Kemble, suspended publication for the same reason on June 14.

Both The Californian and the California Star were bought in 1848 and their printing equipment was combined into one publication, the Alta Californian. Finding that one printing press was sufficient, the older press from Monterey was moved by Kemble to Sacramento to print the Placer Times beginning in April 1849. Kemble wished to preserve the press in a museum, but sold it to an Englishman, H. H. Radcliffe, who used it in Stockton to print the Stockton Times and Tuolumne City Intelligencer from mid-1850 to April 1851. Radcliffe also used the old press to print the Sonora Herald for Dr. Gunn beginning in July 1850. Gunn eventually bought out Radcliffe. In October 1851, Gunn sold the press to George Washington Gore who brought the equipment to Columbia, California, to print the Columbia Star. Gunn regained possession in November when Gore was unable to pay the balance of the purchase price. The old press was brought to Sonora, California, to be displayed as a museum piece, and was soon lost there to one of the many fires that destroyed the town before 1858.
