= A. V. Peters House =

Historic house in Oregon, United States

- U.S. National Register of Historic Places
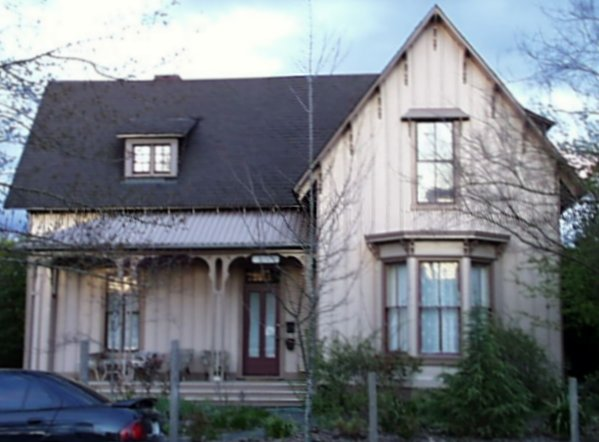
- A. V. Peters house in 2007

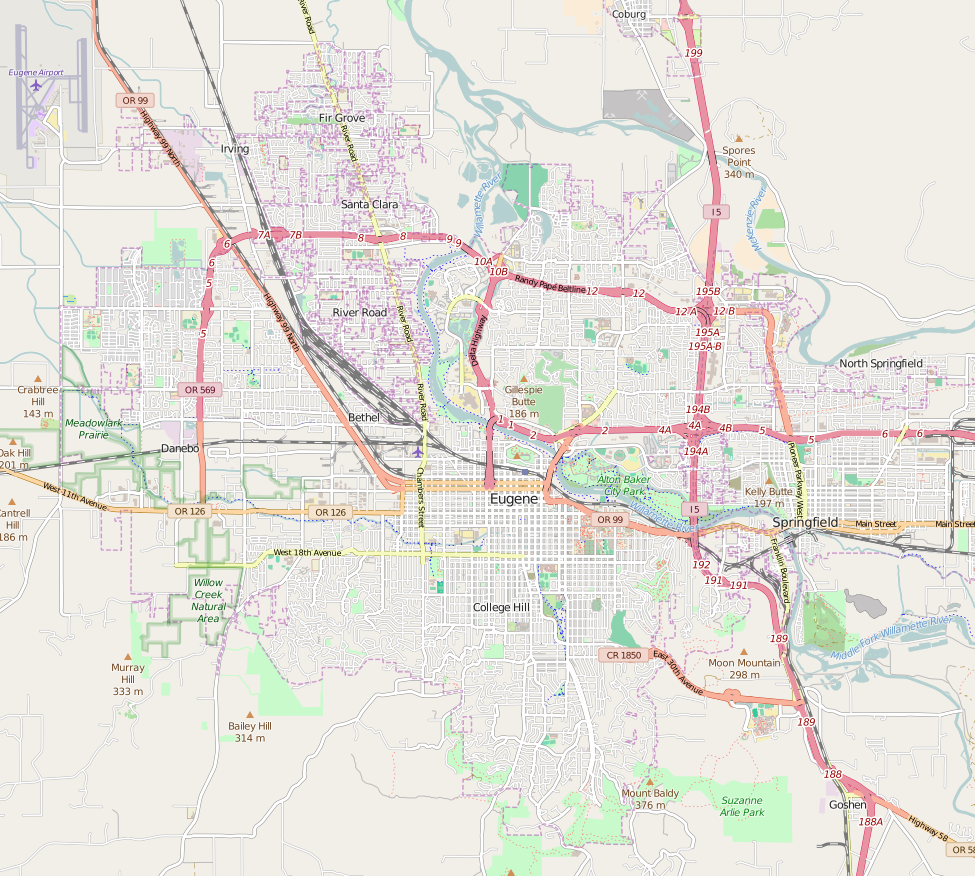
- Location within Eugene OR Location within Oregon
- Location: 1611 Lincoln St, Eugene, Oregon
- Coordinates: 44°2′32″N 123°5′44″W
- Built: 1869
- Architect: Henry W. Cleaveland, et al.
- Architectural style: Gothic Revival, Rural Gothic
- NRHP reference No.: 90001597
- Added to NRHP: October 25, 1990

The A. V. Peters House aka the Peters-Liston-Wintermeier House, located in Eugene, Oregon, United States, is a house listed on the National Register of Historic Places. The house was built circa 1870 for merchant Andrew Vincent Peters and his wife Mary Elizabeth "Lizzy" (Shaw) Peters on the southeast corner of 10th and Pearl streets (661 Pearl Street was the original address), and moved to its current location in 1912. A 1 1/2-story 1890s carriage house was also moved onto the property at about the same time. Considered one of Oregon's finest examples of the Rural Gothic Style, the house was built using a design from a pattern book by Henry W. Cleaveland published in 1856. Another pattern book, Woodward's National Architect, published in 1869, was also used as a reference for some of the decorative elements of the house. The house features board and batten siding, scrollwork balcony detailing, and bracketed eaves supporting the steeply pitched roof.

The house was nominated for National Register of Historic Places listing by its owner in March 1990, and it was listed on the Register in October of that year.

== See also ==
- National Register of Historic Places listings in Lane County, Oregon
