= The Daily Alta California =

19th-century San Francisco newspaper

Alta California
- Type: Weekly newspaper until 1849, then daily
- Owner: Samuel Brannan until 1849, then Robert B. Semple
- Editor: E. B. Jones; Albert S. Evans
- Founded: January 9, 1847
- Ceased publication: June 2, 1891
- Headquarters: San Francisco, California
- Free online archives: cdnc.ucr.edu (1849–1891)

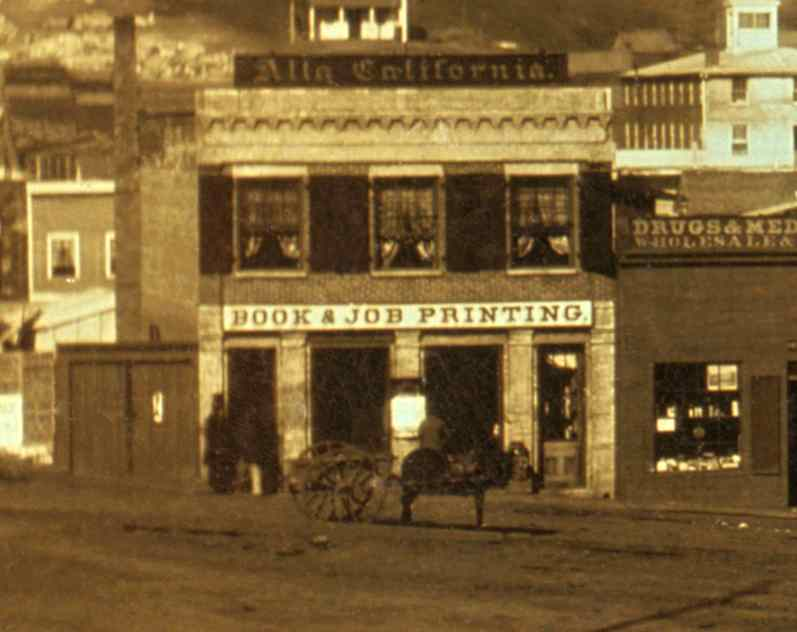
Alta California Building, 1851

The Alta California or Daily Alta California (often miswritten Alta Californian or Daily Alta Californian) was a 19th-century San Francisco newspaper.

== California Star ==
The Daily Alta California descended from the first newspaper published in Yerba Buena (as San Francisco was then called), Samuel Brannan's California Star, which debuted on January 9, 1847. Brannan, who had earlier assisted in publishing several Mormon newspapers in New York, had brought a small press with him when he immigrated to California aboard the ship Brooklyn in 1846, as the leader of a group of Mormon settlers, the "Brooklyn Saints".

With Dr. E. B. Jones as editor, the California Star was the city's only newspaper until an older publication, The Californian, moved to Yerba Buena, California from Monterey in mid-1847. The city was about to undergo rapid changes as the California gold rush got underway. The California Star appeared weekly until June 14, 1848, when it was forced to shut down because its entire staff had departed for the gold fields. Its rival newspaper had suspended publication for the same reason on May 29.

== Merger and name change ==
Later that year, Sam Brannan sold his interest in the moribund California Star to Edward Cleveland Kemble, who also acquired The Californian. Kemble resumed publication of the combined papers under the name Star and Californian on November 18, 1848. On December 23, 1848, the California Star and Californian ran an article indicating this would be the last issue. In a business arrangement with the firm of Gilbert, Kemble and Hubbard, a new paper, entitled ALTA CALIFORNIA, would be published at San Francisco, Upper California, the first issue of which would appear on Thursday, January 4, 1849.

By 1849, the paper had come under the control of Robert B. Semple, cofounder of The Californian, who changed its name to the Alta California. On January 22, the paper began daily publication, becoming the first daily newspaper in California. On July 4, 1849, Semple began printing the Daily Alta California on a new steam press, the first such press in the west. In 1863, Albert S. Evans became editor at the paper and continued in that capacity for several years. The newspaper continued publication until June 2, 1891.

== Other editions ==
The Daily Alta California was also published as weekly, tri-weekly, and steamer editions. The Weekly Alta California was published every Saturday and the Steamer Alta California was published on the departure of the Steamers of the 1st and 15th of the month.

== See also ==
- List of San Francisco newspapers
