= Rancho Los Ulpinos =

Coordinates: 38.160°N 121.720°W

Rancho Los Ulpinos was a 17,726-acre (71.73 km^{2}) Mexican land grant in present-day Solano County, California given in 1844 by Governor Manuel Micheltorena to John Bidwell. The grant was located on the west bank of the Sacramento River at the junction with Cache Slough, and encompassed the Montezuma Hills and present-day Rio Vista.

== History ==
John Bidwell (1819–1900) was born in Chautauqua County, New York, and led the Bartleson-Bidwell Party to California in 1841. John Sutter employed Bidwell as his business manager shortly after Bidwell's arrival in California. Bidwell obtained the four square league Rancho Los Ulpinos Mexican land grant in 1844. Bidwell obtained the two square league Rancho Colus in 1845. Bidwell built an adobe house in the vicinity of present-day Rio Vista, and attempted to cultivate the land. Bidwell's efforts at agriculture, as well as those of subsequent settlers on the ranch, were unsuccessful.

With the cession of California to the United States following the Mexican-American War, the 1848 Treaty of Guadalupe Hidalgo provided that the land grants would be honored. As required by the Land Act of 1851, a claim for Rancho Los Ulpinos was filed with the Public Land Commission in 1852, and the grant was patented to John Bidwell in 1866. A separate claim filed by Juan M. Luco was rejected due to fraud.

Rancho Los Ulpinos was subdivided into 20 equal parcels and sold on the Benicia courthouse steps in 1855. Among those who purchased lots was Colonel N.H. Davis, who founded Rio Vista in 1857. Joseph Bruning (1822–), a German, came to the mines on Yuba River in 1850. He then went to San Francisco and engaged in the hotel business until 1858, when he settled on the Los Ulpinos grant.

== See also ==
- Ranchos of California
- List of Ranchos of California
