= Henry W. Cleaveland =

American architect

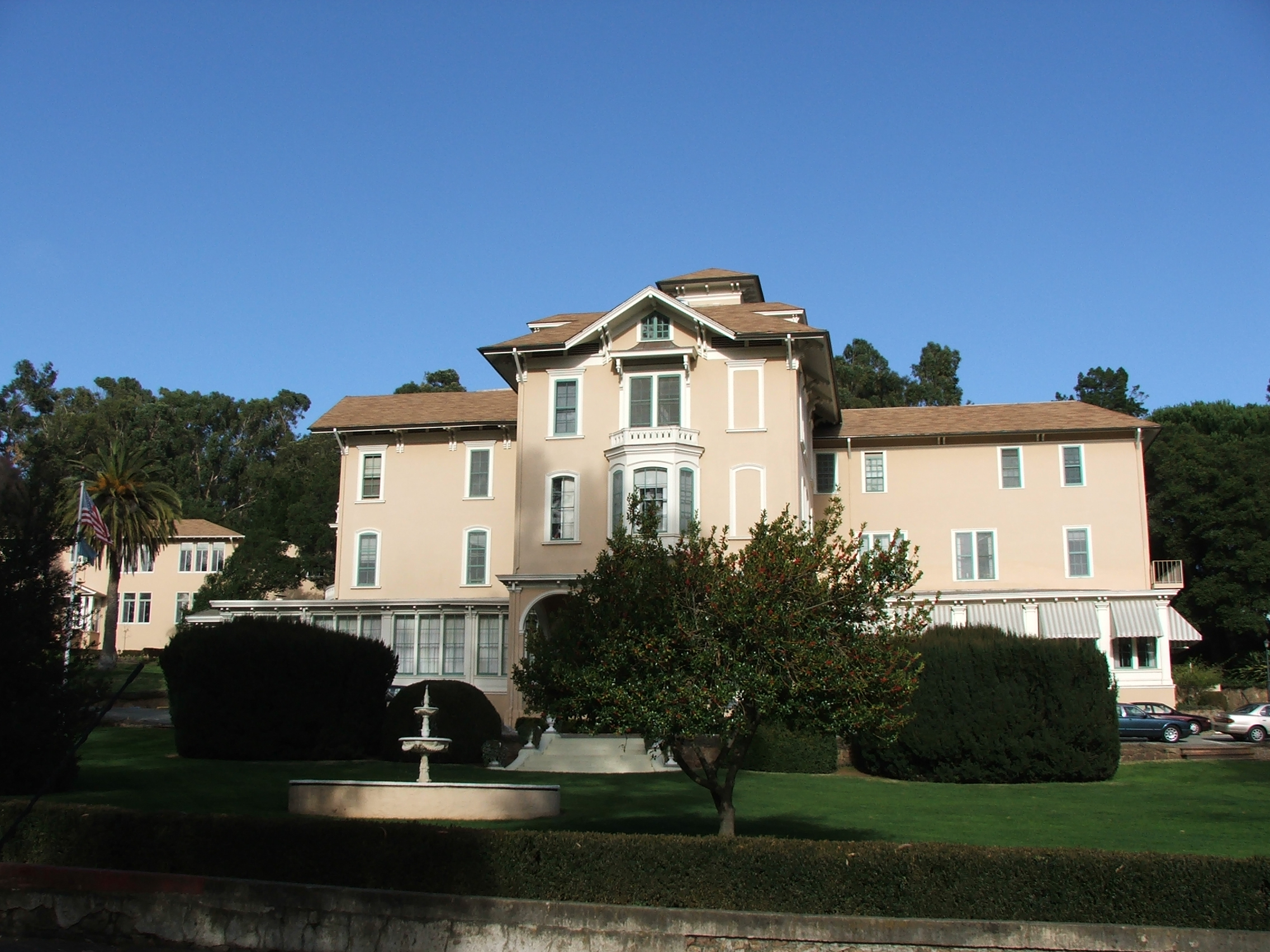
Cleaveland's Ralston Hall in the San Francisco Bay Area is a National Historic Landmark.

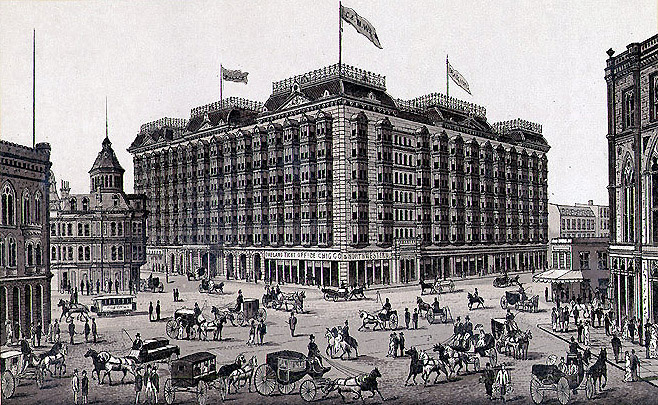
Original Palace Hotel in San Francisco

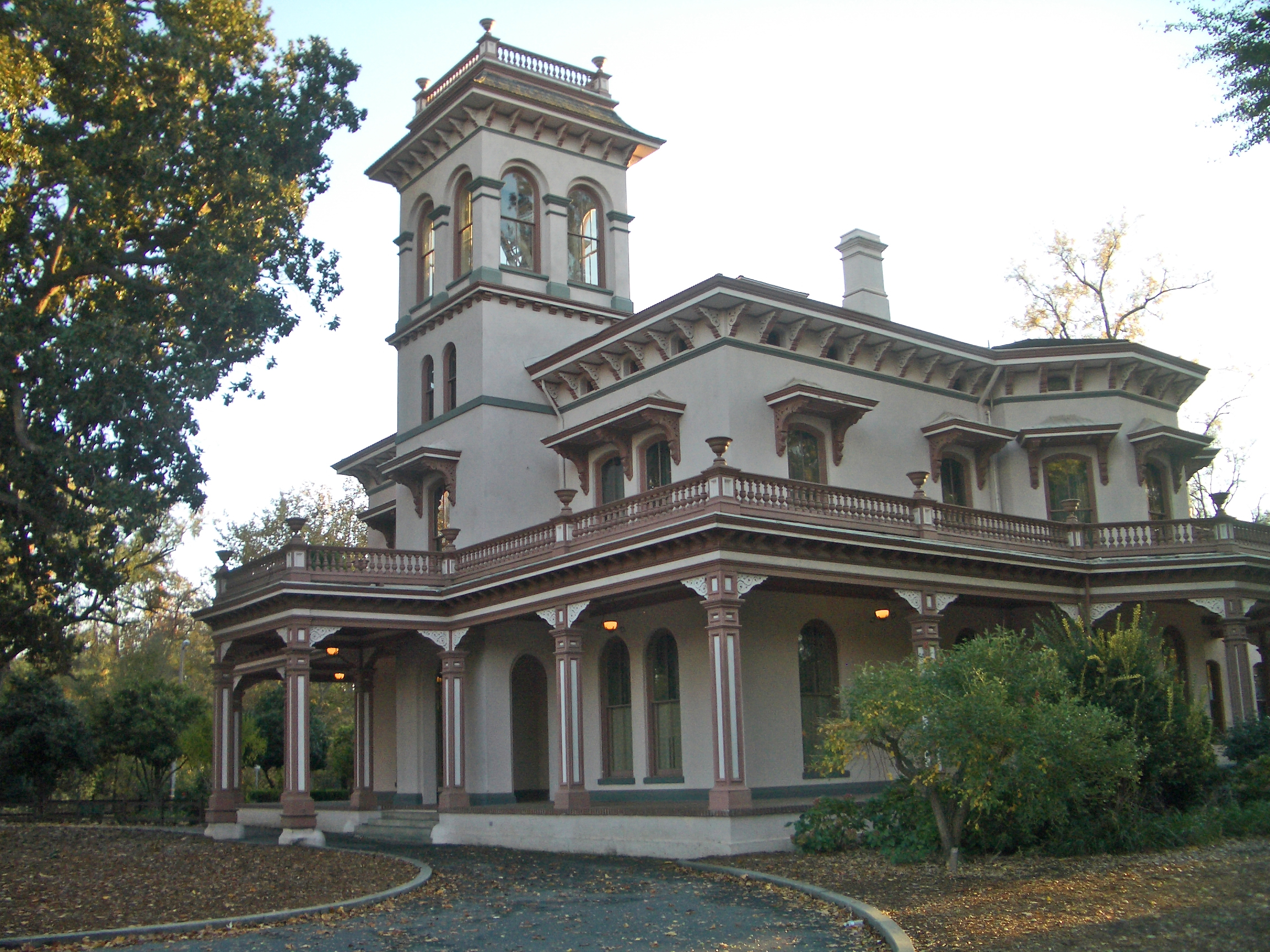
Bidwell Mansion in Chico, California

Henry William Cleaveland (December 17, 1827 – May 29, 1919) was an American architect based in New York, New York, and then San Francisco, California, and Portland, Oregon. He was one of the founding members of the American Institute of Architects, and several of his works have been listed on the National Register of Historic Places. His works include Ralston Hall, a National Historic Landmark in the San Francisco Bay Area, the original Palace Hotel in San Francisco, and the Bidwell Mansion in Chico, California. He was elevated to the AIA College of Fellows in 1857.

== Biography ==
Cleaveland was born on December 17, 1827 in Massachusetts. His father was an academic at Bowdoin College in Brunswick, Maine. In the 1840s, Cleaveland moved to New York City to study architecture. In the 1850s, he was a practicing architect in New York in partnership with brothers Wiliam and Samuel Backus.

Cleaveland is said to have been a "disciple" of Andrew Jackson Downing, who published highly influential architectural patternbooks. With his partners, the Backus brothers, Cleaveland co-authored a patternbook of his own, Village and Farm Cottages, which was published in 1856 and, as of 1990, had last been reprinted in 1869. It is now available on-line. Cleaveland's book, and another by Gervase Wheeler, were credited with having "flashed the Stick look far and wide" and having "inspired local builders to erect Stick houses, or incorporate their details, on a truly national scale for the first time, from the established Northeast to the burgeoning cities of the West like San Francisco."

In February 1857, Cleaveland was one of 13 architects who met to form an organization to "promote the scientific and practical perfection of its members" and "elevate the standing of the profession." The organization became the American Institute of Architects.

In 1859, Cleaveland moved to San Francisco, California. Along with S & J Newsom and Bernard Maybeck, he has been credited with playing an influential role in the transition of California's architectural style from Spanish-Mexican influence to "the state's unique Victorian style." While in San Francisco, Cleaveland designed some of his most notable works, including Ralston Hall in Belmont, California, which has been designated as a National Historic Landmark. He also designed the original Palace Hotel, built in 1875 and destroyed in the fire that followed the 1906 San Francisco earthquake. He also worked for a time as an architect in Portland, Oregon.

After retiring, Cleaveland moved to Poughkeepsie, New York. He died at age 96 on May 29, 1919 at the home of his nephew, Manning Cleaveland, in Poughkeepsie.

Several of Cleaveland's works are listed on the National Register of Historic Places, and at least one has been designated as a National Historic Landmark.

== Works ==
Works include:

- Bidwell Mansion (1864–1865), 525 Esplanade, Chico, California; NRHP-listed and CHL-listed
- A. H. Chapman House (1859), at 256 E. 12th St., Chico, California; NRHP-listed
- A. V. Peters House (1869), 1611 Lincoln St., Eugene, Oregon; NRHP-listed
- Palace Hotel (original, 1876), 2 New Montgomery Street, San Francisco, California
- Ralston Hall (1864), Belmont, California; NRHP-listed and NHL-listed
