= Alonzo W. Adams =

American politician

Alonzo Whitney Adams
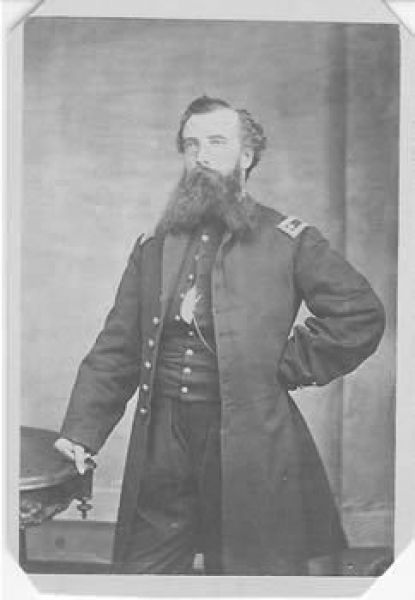

Member of the California Senate from District 17
- In office 1851–1852
- Preceded by: John Bidwell
- Succeeded by: Charles F. Lott, Joseph E.N. Lewis

Personal details
- Born: March 7, 1820 Caroline, New York
- Died: February 22, 1887 (aged 66)
- Resting place: LaGrange, Ohio

Military service
- Allegiance: United States
- Branch/service: United States Army; Union Army
- Years of service: 1848; 1861 - 1865
- Rank: Colonel; Bvt. Brigadier General
- Commands: 1st New York Cavalry Regiment
- Battles/wars: Mexican–American War; American Civil War: Battle of Antietam; Battle of Gettysburg

Alonzo Whitney Adams (March 7, 1820 – February 22, 1887) was an American lawyer, politician and military officer. Born in Caroline, New York, he served in the California legislature.

During the Mexican–American War, Adams served as a captain in the U.S. Army.

During the American Civil War Adams fought at the Battle of Antietam as major and commander of the 1st Regiment New York Volunteer Cavalry. He reached the rank of colonel as of July 27, 1864. Adams was mustered out of the volunteers on June 27, 1865. On March 18, 1867, President Andrew Johnson nominated Adams for the rank of brevet brigadier general, to rank from March 13, 1865, and the United States Senate confirmed the nomination on March 28, 1867.

Alonzo W. Adams died February 22, 1887 and is buried at LaGrange, Ohio.

== Notes ==
Preceded by John Bidwell	Member of the California Senate from District 17; 1851–1852	Succeeded by Joseph E.N. Lewis; Charles F. Lott
