= Ralston Hall =

Historic house in Belmont, California

- William C. Ralston House
- U.S. National Register of Historic Places
- U.S. National Historic Landmark
- California Historical Landmark
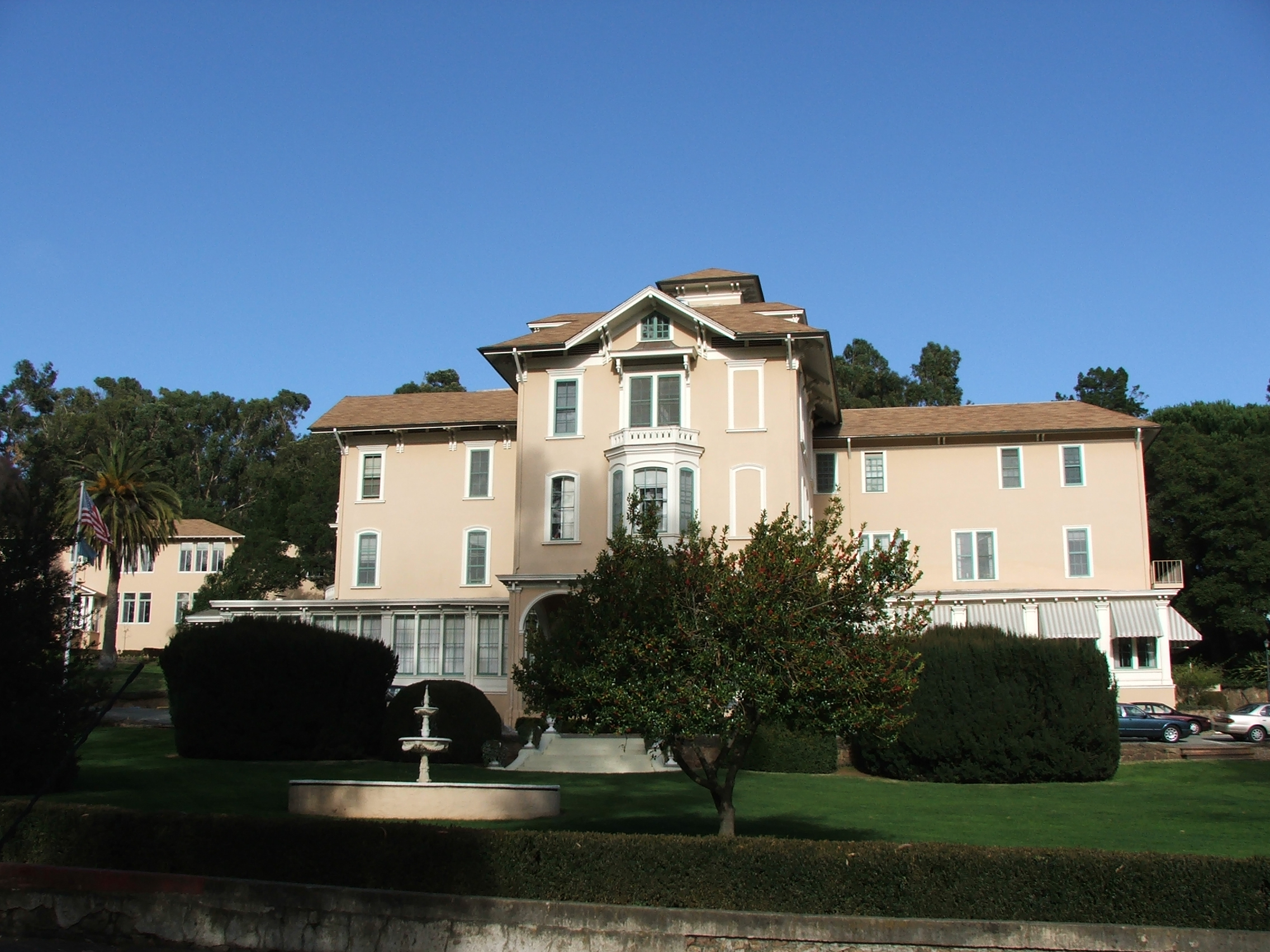
- The mansion in 2005

- Location within San Francisco Bay Area Location within California Location within the United States
- Location: Belmont, California, United States
- Coordinates: 37°31′3″N 122°17′10″W
- Area: 4 acres (1.6 ha)
- Built: 1864
- Architect: Henry Cleaveland
- Architectural style: Victorian-Italianate Villa
- NRHP reference No.: 66000234
- CHISL No.: 856

Significant dates
- Added to NRHP: November 15, 1966
- Designated NHL: November 13, 1966
- Designated CHISL: 1972

Ralston Hall Mansion located in Belmont, California, was the country house of William Chapman Ralston, a San Francisco businessman, a founder of the Bank of California, and a financier of the Comstock Lode. It is an opulent Italianate Villa, modified with touches of Steamboat Gothic and Victorian details. It is a California Historical Landmark and is designated a National Historic Landmark. It has been incorporated into the campus of Notre Dame de Namur University.

== Description ==
Ralston Hall Mansion is situated on the campus of Notre Dame de Namur University, on the San Francisco Peninsula. The mansion has been built around the villa of Count Leonetto Cipriani, the former owner of the estate. Taking three years to build, it was completed in 1867, when San Francisco's leaders and first citizens had large summer homes on the Peninsula, an integral part of San Francisco high society. Architect John Painter Gaynor, who later worked with Ralston on the Palace Hotel in San Francisco, is thought to have worked on it. Several of the design elements of Ralston Hall Mansion were copied in the design of the Palace.

A history of San Francisco speaks of the palatial grandeur of Ralston Hall: "In a domed wing was the oval ballroom. Its walls were mirrored, and from the frescoed ceiling hung a great crystal chandelier whose reflected lights and sparkle filled the room. I have never seen a more effective setting for a ball."

The Hall is a four-floor, 55,000-square-foot (5,100 m^{2}) mansion, with a stately dining room, a mirrored ballroom in the Versailles tradition, an opera box modelled after the Opéra Garnier in Paris, a grand staircase, 23 crystal chandeliers, and inlaid wood floors. Ralston greatly admired the Palace of Versailles, and incorporated several of the palace's elements in his design of the mansion. The mansion has a number of elegant sitting rooms and parlours. The Oriental Music Room has a set of Chinese high-tea chairs and buffets. Ralston Hall houses a collection of antiques accumulated by Ralston, including some valuable Thomas Hill paintings.

The grounds of the mansion contain numerous gardens, a stoney grotto, and a garden of 150-year-old bamboo trees.

== Uses ==
After Ralston's death, the estate passed to his former business partner, United States Senator from Nevada William Sharon, whose family lived in the house. Sharon's daughter Flora's wedding to Englishman Sir Thomas George Fermor-Hesketh, 7th Baronet, of Rufford was one of the last elaborate social events of the time, taking place in the mansion's ballroom. After Senator Sharon's death in 1885, the mansion became Radcliffe Hall, a girls' finishing school. From 1900 to 1922, it was the Gardner Sanitarium.

Since 1922, Ralston Hall has been on the campus Notre Dame de Namur University, formerly the College of Notre Dame. Prior to its closure in 2012, the mansion contained some of the university's administrative and faculty offices, such as the admissions office. It was also used for some of the university's events, such as “drama productions, concerts, recitals, guest lectures, student, faculty and staff meetings and forums”. The mansion was also used for weddings, galas, and other various events. In addition, it was open for public tours.

A few of the notable persons who have been entertained at Ralston Hall include:

- President Ulysses S. Grant
- Admiral David Farragut
- Leland Stanford
- Mark Hopkins

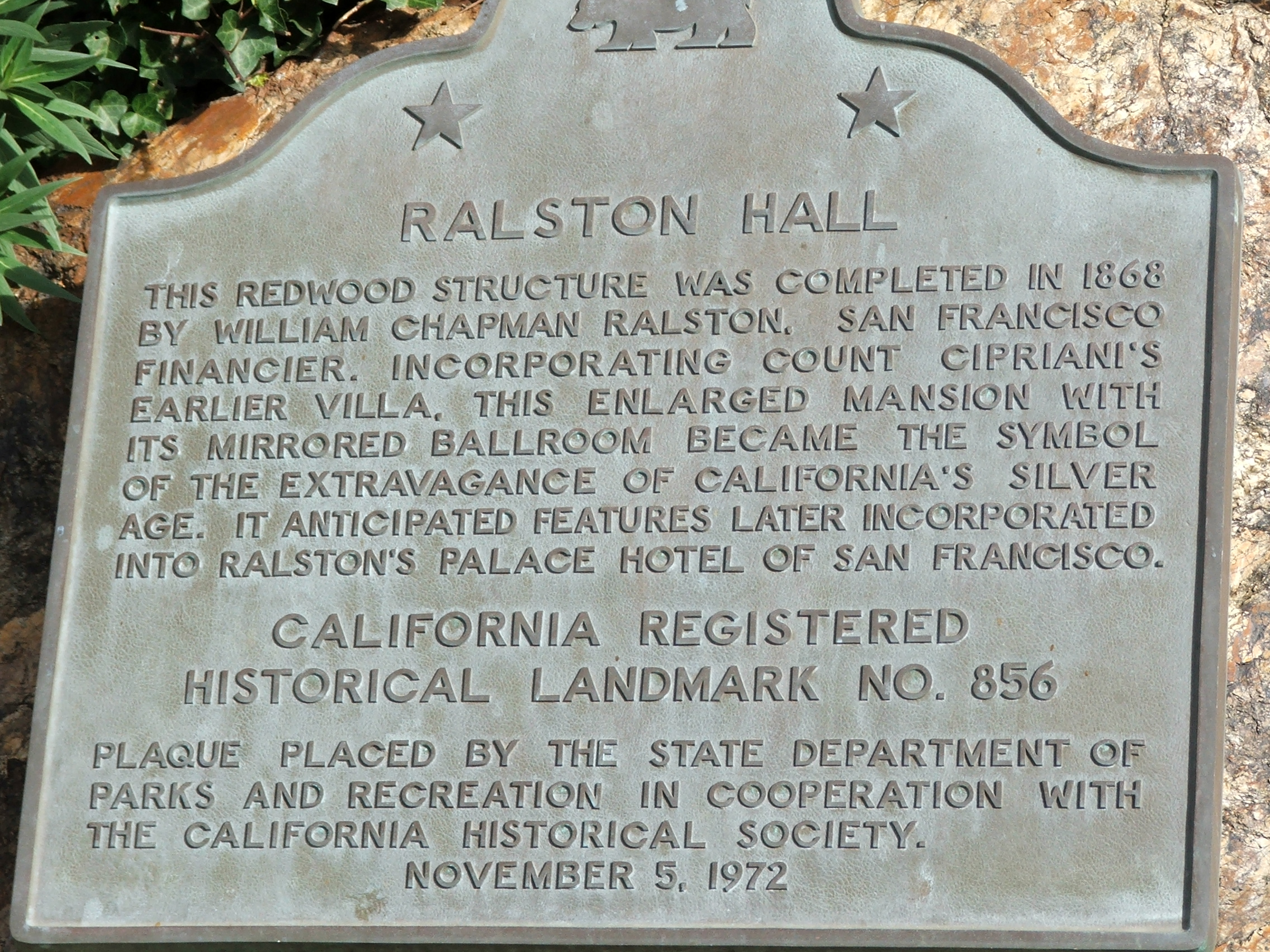

== History ==
=== Cipriani period (1853–1864) ===
Originally, the mansion was built for Count Leonetto Cipriani in 1853. The original house was a “two-story Italian Villa-style house, featuring asymmetrical massing, Italianate cave brackets, lacy bargeboards, and a tower”. Some of the original house remains in the east wing. In 1864, Cipriani sold the building to William Chapman Ralston.

=== William Chapman Ralston period (1864–1875) ===
In 1864, William Chapman Ralston bought the villa. Ralston was a San Francisco businessman and entrepreneur who created the Bank of California. For the next few years, Ralston added to the building and grounds, and created one of the “first palatial home on the Peninsula”. He hosted many guests at the mansion, including Admiral David Farragut, Vice President Schuyler Colfax, Leland Stanford, Mark Hopkins, Anson Burlingame, James Flood, and Mark Twain.

After Ralston finished expanding the mansion, it “resembled a hotel with extensive High Victorian architectural interiors; grand entertainment spaces on the main floor; European Renaissance designed pilasters, moldings, columns, interior arches, staircases, and furnishings; a remodeled ballroom, reception hall, and dining room; state-of-the-art ventilation system; imported embossed glass in skylights, doors, and windows; and decoratively painted rooms”.

Ralston called the estate “Belmont”, and this eventually became the name for the town surrounding the estate. Outside of the mansion, the estate had a “ stone carriage house, barns, a bowling alley, greenhouses, servants’ quarters, and a gymnasium with Victorian Turkish baths”. The estate was built to be self sufficient, with innovative gas and water systems. A reservoir was constructed on the property in 1870.

In 1875 when Ralston himself died, and the Ralston era of the estate ended. Before his death, Ralston gave the estate to Senator William Sharon, his business partner.

=== Senator William Sharon period, and Radcliffe Hall (1875–1895; 1895–1898) ===
Sharon inherited the mansion in 1875. He did not live in the mansion, but maintained it and used it for entertaining. Ulysses S. Grant visited during this time in 1879, two years after his presidency. In 1885, Sharon died. His family kept the mansion until 1895. After the Sharon family, the mansion was used as a girls finishing school from 1895 to 1898, called Radcliffe Hall.

=== Gardner Sanitarium (1900–1922) ===
From 1900 to 1918, it was then a sanitarium founded and operated by Dr. A. M. Gardner formally of Napa State Hospital, and was called Gardner Sanitarium. After Gardner's death in 1913 the hospital became less popular and finally closed after World War I in 1922.

=== Sisters of Notre Dame de Namur (1922–to present) ===
The sanitarium closed after World War I. In 1922, the Sisters of Notre Dame de Namur bought the mansion as a location for their college. The mansion is owned by the Notre Dame de Namur University. In 1966, Ralston Hall was designated a National Historic Landmark and in 1972, it became a California registered Historic Landmark.

In 2012 an engineering firm advised Notre Dame de Namur University (NDNU) that in spite of the home's relatively good condition “it could not guarantee the safety of the building’s occupants in the event of an earthquake on the San Andreas Fault”. In April 2012, the building was closed, pending renovation.

Among the required work is “replacement or retrofit, as necessary, of the entire masonry foundation”, and the "re-roofing, removal and replacement of existing siding and localized replacement of the flooring” of the upper floors. The repairs are estimated to cost at least $12 million.

In February 2019, NDNU decided to place the Ralston Hall renovation project on hold to focus on fundraising for the school.

== Historical significance ==
In order to help assure its preservation, the City of Belmont commissioned an architectural historian in 2016 to conduct an assessment of the Ralston Hall's historical significance.

Among his findings were that the mansion “retains its historic integrity, location, design, setting, materials, workmanship, feeling, and association” (with William Chapman Ralston from 1864 to 1875). One of the first palatial homes on the peninsula, it is noted for its architecture.
