= Rancho Jimeno =

Land grant in California

Coordinates: 39.030°N 121.860°W

Rancho Jimeno was a 48,854-acre (197.71 km^{2}) Mexican land grant in present-day Colusa County and Yolo County, California given in 1844 by Governor Manuel Micheltorena to Manuel Jimeno Casarin. The grant extended along the west bank of the Sacramento River from near the northern border of Colusa County south to just over the northern border of Yolo County.

== History ==
Micheltorena granted eleven square leagues (the maximum allowable under Mexican law) to Jimeno. Manual Jimeno Casarin served as secretary of state under Governor Alvarado and Governor Micheltorena, was a senior member of the State Assembly, and occasionally acting governor. He was married to María de las Angustias, the daughter of José de la Guerra y Noriega. Jimeno, who lived in Monterey, also owned Rancho Salsipuedes in Santa Cruz County and Rancho Santa Paula y Saticoy in Ventura County. Unlike many land grants holders, Jimeno was not required to show any use or development of the land and apparently he did not use the land, either for agriculture or ranching. He died in 1853 during a visit to Mexico.

Thomas O. Larkin (1802 - 1858), consul of the United States at Monterey, was not a Mexican citizen, and could not obtain a direct land grant. But in 1847, with California in the possession of General Kearney, Larkin, in association with John S. Missroon, a naval lieutenant, bought Manuel Jimeno's eleven-league grant.

With the cession of California to the United States following the Mexican-American War, the 1848 Treaty of Guadalupe Hidalgo provided that the land grants would be honored. As required by the Land Act of 1851, a claim for Rancho Jimeno was filed with the Public Land Commission in 1852, confirmed by the US Supreme Court in 1855, and the grant was patented to Thomas O. Larkin and John S. Missroon in 1862.

However, the final survey of Rancho Jimeno included the Rancho Colus grant, resulting in much litigation regarding ownership of the land.
