= Bidwell Mansion State Historic Park =

Historic building in Chico, California, United States

- Bidwell Mansion State Historical Park
- U.S. National Register of Historic Places
- California Historical Landmark
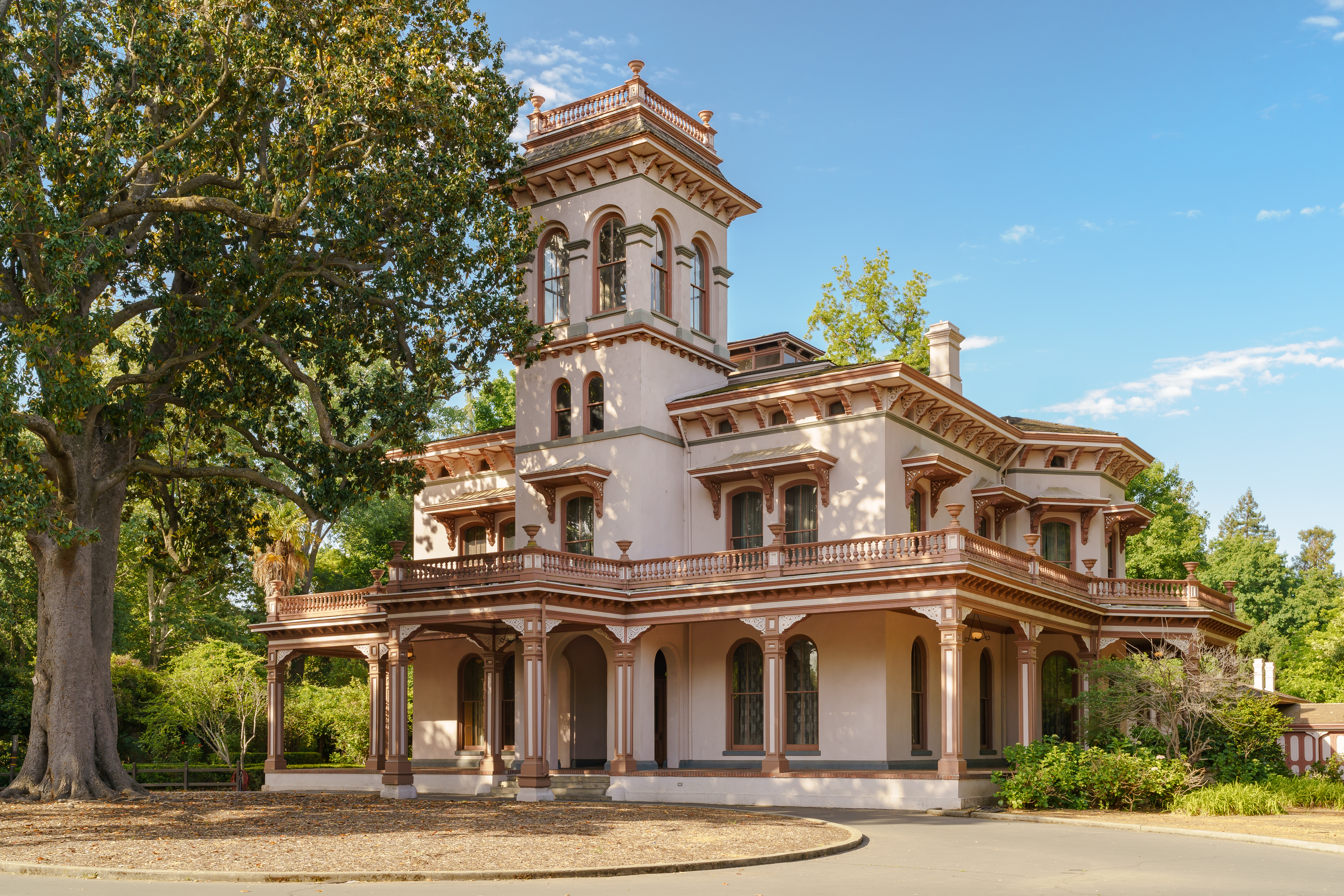
- Bidwell Mansion in May 2021
- Location: 525 Esplanade, Chico, California, United States
- Coordinates: 39°43′56.47″N 121°50′36.53″W
- Built: 1865
- Architect: Henry W. Cleaveland
- Architectural style: Italianate, Italian Villa, Octagon house
- NRHP reference No.: 72000216
- CHISL No.: 329

Significant dates
- Added to NRHP: March 24, 1972
- Designated CHISL: August 8, 1939

Bidwell Mansion State Historic Park was a historic building with surrounding land in Chico, California, United States. It is listed as a California Historical Landmark #329 under the name "Rancho Chico And Bidwell Adobe" in 1939; and was listed on the National Register of Historic Places under the name "Bidwell Mansion" on March 24, 1972. On December 11, 2024, the building was destroyed by arson, although the bulk of the brick and masonry frame remains standing.

== History ==
Bidwell Mansion was the home of General John Bidwell and Annie Bidwell from late 1868 until 1900, when Gen. Bidwell died. Annie continued to live there until her death in 1918. John Bidwell began construction of the mansion on his 26,000 acres (110 km^{2}) Rancho del Arroyo Chico in 1865, during his courtship of Annie Ellicott Kennedy. After their marriage in 1868, the three-story, 26-room Victorian house became the social and cultural center of the upper Sacramento Valley. The mansion was a $60,000 project, and was finished in May 1868.

When constructed, Bidwell Mansion featured modern plumbing, gas lighting and water systems. The three-story brick structure was built in an informally romantic version of the Italianate style. It also had aspects of the Italian Villa and Octagon house types present. The building's exterior was finished with a pink tinted plaster.

From 1925 to 1935, Bidwell Mansion served as a dormitory for Chico State Teachers College female students. The mansion was later dubbed "Bidwell Hall" and housed the art and home economics departments.

The state of California acquired the site in 1964.

Some of the interior scenes from the film The Thin Man (1934) were shot inside the mansion.

=== Fire and destruction ===
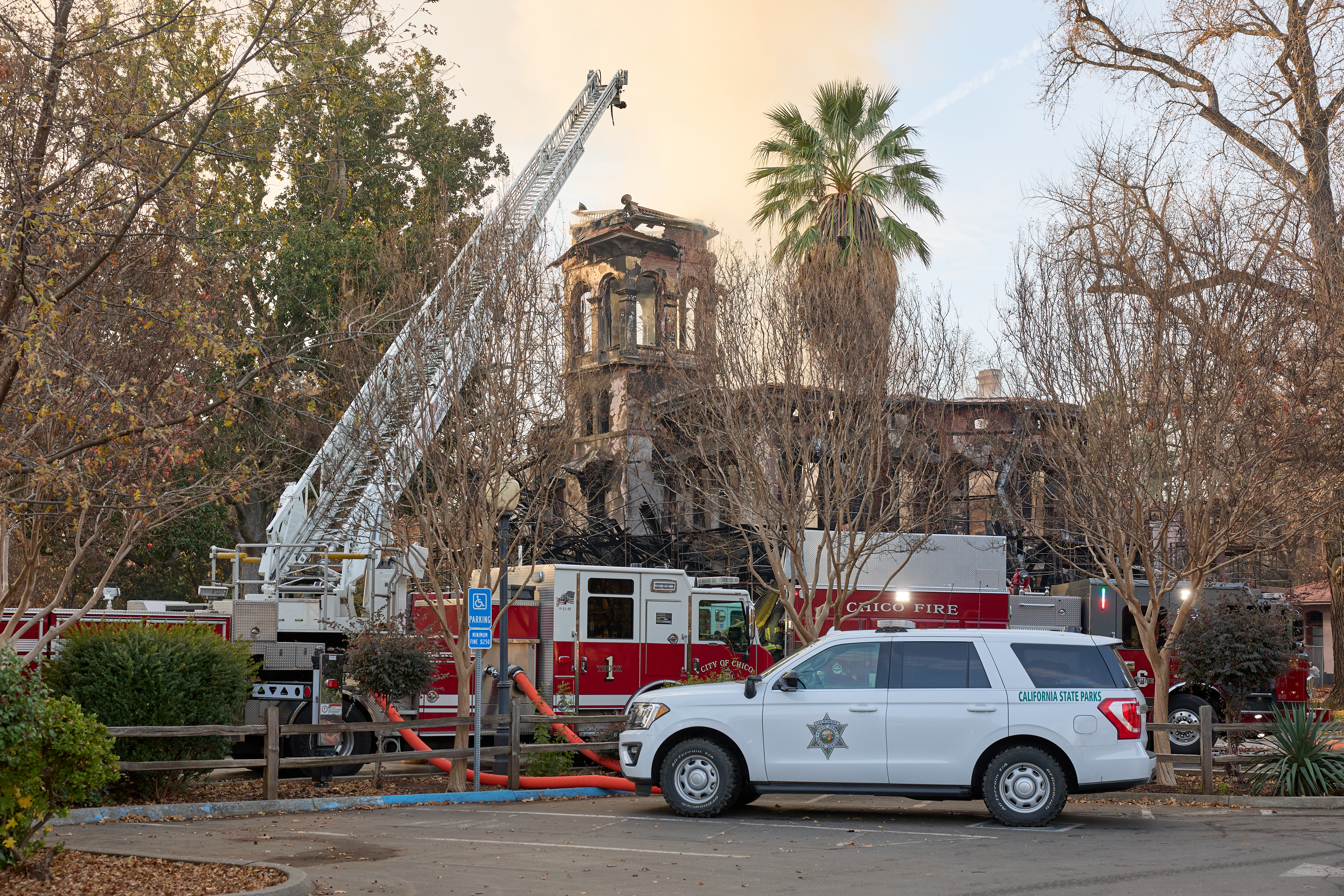
Ruins of Bidwell Mansion after a fire on December 11, 2024

In the early morning on December 11, 2024, a fire swept the mansion. It was reported that the top tower collapsed at 4:05 a.m. Arson was determined as the cause of the fire. The mansion had been closed for renovations since early 2024, with plans to reopen in March 2025. No injuries were reported. On March 5, 2025, thirty-year-old Chico man Kevin Carlson was sentenced to 11 years in state prison for intentionally starting the fire. The recovery planning effort will include close coordination with stakeholders, community members, and the Mechoopda Tribe. The first stage of recovery focuses on debris removal, then moves into planning and execution. According to Matt Teague, District Superintendent for the California Department of Parks and Recreation’s Northern Buttes District, this initial phase may take roughly a year. The long-term vision is to restore and elevate the mansion as a richer, more engaging historical site.

== See also ==
- National Register of Historic Places listings in Butte County, California
- Bidwell Park
- Michael Gillis
