= Michael Gillis =

American historian

- Born: Michael Jerome Gillis; 1949; Walpole, Massachusetts, U.S.
- Died: April 7, 2007 (aged 57–58); Stanford University Medical Center, Stanford, California, U.S.
- Occupations: Academic, writer

Michael Jerome Gillis (1949 – April 7, 2007) was an American academic and writer.

== Life and career ==
Born in Walpole, Massachusetts, Gillis served as a history instructor at Butte College (1981–1985) and, for twenty-five years, as a lecturer at California State University, Chico. Professor Gillis was greatly admired by many of his students for his interesting lectures and warm personality.

His articles and reviews have appeared in the History/Social Science Journal, Diggins (Butte County Historical Society), the Dogtown Territorian Quarterly, now known as The California Territorial Quarterly, John Muir Newsletter, Overland Journal, Canadian Social Studies, California History, the American Indian Quarterly, Journal of the West, Pacific Northwest Quarterly, and Nevada Historical Society Quarterly.

During the course of his career, Gillis published three books (see bibliography). As part of his research for the Bidwell book, Gillis undertook an exploratory backpacking trip during which he and his wife located and retraced the probable route taken by the Bartleson-Bidwell Party during its famous trek across the Sierra Nevada in 1841. Gillis later published an account of the trip, along with his findings, in an article that appeared in the Winter 1998–99 issue of the Overland Journal.

Gillis served as vice president of the Bidwell Mansion Association (1997–2000) and was a member of the association's board of directors from 1995 to 2005. Gillis was also a member of the Butte County Historical Society and the Association for Northern California Records and Research, serving as ANCRR's president from 1994 to 1998.

He was known and respected by every historian on the Western seaboard and was an emeritus professor.

Gillis died April 7 at Stanford University Medical Center after a 10-month battle with a rare liver disease called primary sclerosing cholangitis.

== Bibliography ==
- Gillis, Michael J. (editor) (1990). Essays in North American Indian History. Kendall/Hunt. ISBN 978-0-8403-6263-6.
- Gillis, Michael J.; Michael Magliari (2003). John Bidwell and California: The Life and Writings of a Pioneer, 1841-1900 (Western Frontiersmen Series, 30). Spokane: Arthur H. Clark. ISBN 978-0-87062-316-5.
- Gillis, Michael J. (2004). Soper-Wheeler Company: A Century of Tree Farming. Documentary Media LLC and University of Washington. ISBN 978-0-9719084-4-4.
