= Rancho Colus =

Mexican land grant in California

Coordinates: 39.240°N 122.040°W

Rancho Colus was a 8,877-acre (35.92 km^{2}) Mexican land grant in present-day Colusa County, California given in 1845 by Governor Pío Pico to John Bidwell. The name is derived from the name of a Native American tribe living on the west side of the Sacramento River. The grant extended two leagues along the west bank of the Sacramento River, and encompassed present-day Colusa.

== History ==
John Bidwell (1819–1900) was born in Chautauqua County, New York, and led the Bartleson-Bidwell Party to California in 1841. John Sutter employed Bidwell as his business manager shortly after Bidwell's arrival in California. Bidwell obtained the two square league Mexican land grant in 1845.

Colonel Charles D. Semple arrived in California in 1849. Semple's brother, Dr. Robert B. Semple, was president of the 1849 California Constitutional Convention and co-owner of the adjacent Rancho Jimeno. Charles D. Semple bought Rancho Colus from Bidwell in 1850.

With the cession of California to the United States following the Mexican-American War, the 1848 Treaty of Guadalupe Hidalgo provided that the land grants would be honored. As required by the Land Act of 1851, a claim for Rancho Colus was filed with the Public Land Commission in 1852, but was rejected as the Land Commission considered the grant boundaries were undefined. On appeal, the grant was confirmed by the District Court in 1855, and by the US Supreme Court, and the grant was patented to Charles D. Semple in 1869.

However, the final survey of Rancho Jimeno included the Rancho Colus grant, resulting in much litigation regarding ownership of the land.
