= Dallas Jackson =

Dallas Jackson may refer to:

- Dallas Jackson (ice hockey)
- Dallas Jackson (American football)
