= Victoria Taft =

American actress (1951–2018)

Victoria "Vicki" Taft (November 11, 1951 – November 8, 2018) was an American actress, model, and television commercial actress. She worked in the entertainment industry during the 1960s, 1970s, and 1980s and was known among family and friends for her involvement in film and television productions in Southern California. She died during the 2018 wildfire in Paradise, California.

== Early life ==
Victoria Taft was born in Norristown, Pennsylvania, and grew up primarily in Los Angeles, California. She was the daughter of cameraman Larry Debaun and Marian Bradford Taft. Through her family, she was exposed to the entertainment industry from an early age. Her father worked on productions for major studios including Paramount Pictures, Columbia Pictures, and Metro-Goldwyn-Mayer, and later on the television series Happy Days. Her paternal grandfather, Everett Debaun, was a television screenwriter.

Taft made her stage debut at the age of six in a production of Gentleman Jane, appearing alongside her father.

== Career ==
Taft worked as an actress, stunt performer, model, and publicity representative. During the late 1960s, she was associated with the Los Angeles music scene and worked as a publicity agent. Over the course of her career, she appeared in films, television productions, and theatrical performances. According to biographical accounts, she was involved in more than 25 entertainment projects.

Her credited film appearances reportedly included roles in Checkered Flag, Rocky III, and Malibu Hot Summer. Other production records and résumés associated with her career listed appearances in television programs such as Flying High, The Love Boat, and The Dating Game. She also worked behind the scenes in production-related roles and served as a stunt double in the 1990 Disney film Dick Tracy, where she doubled for actress Glenne Headly.

Taft worked in real estate in Southern California and was involved in residential property sales in the Beverly Hills area.

== Personal life ==
Taft traveled extensively throughout Europe, North Africa, and the Mediterranean region. She attended Los Angeles Valley College and pursued studies related to real estate and film production. After leaving the entertainment industry, she devoted much of her time to raising her daughter, Christina Taft, in Arizona.

In 2008, she relocated to Paradise, California, where she assisted family members and participated in community activities, including volunteer work with the Paradise Lions Club.

== Death ==
On November 8, 2018, Taft died during the wildfirefire in Paradise, California, the deadliest wildfire in California history at the time. She remained at her home in Paradise, California, as the fire rapidly approached the town. Her remains were later recovered from the ruins of her living room. Her daughter, Christina Taft, subsequently helped document her life and experiences as part of efforts to memorialize wildfire victims. She was 66 years old.

== Legacy ==
Following her death, Taft was featured in several news stories and memorial projects highlighting the lives of wildfire in Paradise, California victims. These accounts documented her background in acting and stunt performance as well as her life in California before relocating to Paradise.
