= List of killings by law enforcement officers in the United States, May 2025 =

This is a list of people reported killed by non-military law enforcement officers in the United States in May 2025, whether in the line of duty or not, and regardless of reason or method. The listing documents the occurrence of a death, making no implications regarding wrongdoing or justification on the part of the person killed or officer involved. Killings are arranged by date of the incident that caused death. Different death dates, if known, are noted in the description. The table below lists 115 people.

== May 2025 ==
Date	Name (age) of deceased	Race	Location	Description
2025-05-31	Michael Collins (75)	Unknown	Mobile, Alabama	MPD conducted a traffic stop on a man, for he had threatened to kill a female. During which, he produced a gun while threatening to harm himself. Officers shot him when he pointed the gun at them.
2025-05-31	Jacob Lyle Epple (32)	White	San Diego, California	A man was blocking traffic while making suicidal statements before driving off, which led police on a chase. After a pursuit through Ocean Beach, he approached SDPD officers with a knife and was tased. He grabbed the knife again and approached officers before getting shot. Police had released the bodycam footage which led to Epple's death.
2025-05-31	Joshua Hayden Sikes (18)	White	Monroe, North Carolina	Monroe Police shot and killed a murder suspect during a manhunt when he shot at officers with a rifle. The suspect also shot one of the officers in a chase.
2025-05-30	Martin Soria (30)	Hispanic	Los Angeles, California	A man fled a traffic stop for speeding and led police on a chase. After crashing the vehicle, he exited it and was tackled and restrained by officers. He suffered a medical condition and died as a result.
2025-05-29	Anthony Collins (24)	Unknown	St. Louis, Missouri	St. Louis police chased a suspect after finding out that he was linked to a robbery. After the pursuit, FBI Fugitive Task Force agents and St. Louis officers found him near the railroad tracks. They shot and killed him for reasons unknown.
2025-05-29	Aamir Allen (35)	Black	Woodbridge, New Jersey	During a domestic violence dispute investigation, WPD found the suspect, Allen, who was reportedly armed with a baseball bat outside a convenience store. He was then shot dead by police during the encounter.
2025-05-29	Johnny Andrew Collins (51)	White	Greer, South Carolina	Greenville County Police was tracking a wanted suspect, Collins, after receiving a tip from an anonymous person. During the encounter, five deputies shot Collins dead when he presented a hatchet.
2025-05-29	Nathaniel Fejerang (19)	Hispanic	Chicago, Illinois	CPD officers attempted to detain Fejerang in an alley in Humboldt Park, however Fejerang ran from the officers, prompting a foot chase. Officers later managed to detain him, during which, Fejerang's gun went off, striking an officer. The officer fired back, killing him. The footage was released by COPA.
2025-05-29	Jorge Dominguez (39)	Hispanic	Albuquerque, New Mexico	Police located a theft suspect, Dominguez, at a motel. After Dominguez jumped out of a second-story window, he held K9 Rebel as a shield and then pointed a gun at officers. In total of 17 rounds were fired by officers, 10 of which struck Dominguez and at least one round hit K9 Rebel. Both of them died from their injuries. The footage had been released.
2025-05-28	Kyle Webster (29)	Unknown	San Tan Valley, Arizona	A Pinal County deputy shot and killed Webster after responding to a domestic violence report. They stated that he approached the deputy with a knife and a pocket tool before being shot.
2025-05-28	Carrie Hall (50)	White	Cartersville, Georgia	A homeowner contacted police to report Hall had fired a shot at the caller's home. Sheriff's deputies pulled Hall over and shot her when she allegedly pointed a gun at them.
2025-05-28	Gary J. Moyer (73)	White	South Whitehall Township, Pennsylvania	Police shot and killed a man holding a rifle while advancing toward them. According to the DA's office, the man was suffering from health issues and had a suicide note at his home.
2025-05-28	Michael Anthony Koch (41)	White	Marshall, Michigan	Calhoun County Police responded to reports of a suicidal man. Deputies shot and killed the man after he pointed a BB gun and yelled "shoot me" at them. The first ten seconds of body camera video before the fatal shooting was released.
2025-05-27	John Bonds (65)	Black	Colonie, New York	Bonds, a pedestrian, was struck by a car driven by an off-duty Colonie officer. He died on June 2. The CCTV footage was released.
2025-05-27	Christian Thomas Allen (60)	White	Salt Lake City, Utah	A woman dialed 911 about a man who violated a protective order and threatened to kill her, later identified as Allen. When SLCPD officers arrived, they shot and killed Allen when he walked toward them with a knife. The bodycam footage had been released.
2025-05-27	unidentified female (34)	Unknown	Tahlequah, Oklahoma	Cherokee County Police responded to a domestic violence report and found a victim who was attacked by a female family member. Sheriff's Office stated that a deputy shot and killed the suspect after she suddenly moved toward him with a sharp object.
2025-05-27	Michael Anthony Baker Jr. (47)	White	Middletown, Ohio	Police shot and killed a man while executing an arrest warrant at a home. The man allegedly pointed a handgun at officers. A woman in the home was injured by shrapnel.
2025-05-27	Marco Dorsey (43)	Black	Jeffersontown, Kentucky	An off-duty officer heard reports of a man behaving strangely and breaking car windows. The officer confronted and shot the man, Dorsey. The officer said he shot Dorsey when he charged at the officer.
2025-05-26	Cornelius Johnson (21)	Black	Fort Lauderdale, Florida	Police pursued Johnson during a shots fired call. Police unleashed a K-9 on Johnson, which bit him several times. Johnson suffered an infection as a result of the dog and died after several days in the hospital.
2025-05-26	Albert Florencio Howie (54)	Hispanic	Ingleside, Texas	After responding to a shooting, Ingleside Police officers discovered a homicide victim. An off-duty officer was placed under arrest and faced murder charges.
2025-05-26	Timothy Schultz (42)	White	Polk County, Florida	A convenience store clerk called police to report Schultz was acting erratically. While deputies searched for him, residents of a neighborhood reported that a man, later identified as Schultz, was swimming in an alligator-infested lake. Schultz exited the lake with an apparent alligator bite, then walked between houses holding a pair of garden shears before attempting to break into a vehicle with a brick. Two deputies shot Schultz when he allegedly entered a police vehicle and attempted to grab a rifle.
2025-05-26	Dennis Arment (58)	White	Bloomfield, New Mexico	Police shot and killed Arment after he shot an officer during a traffic stop. Bloomfield Police Officer Timothy Ontiveros, who was shot by Arment, ultimately succumbed to his injuries on June 1st.
2025-05-26	Jose Hernandez (91)	Hispanic	Los Angeles, California	Two officers were responding to a call in the San Fernando Valley when another driver made a left turn in front of them. The LAPD vehicle struck the other car, and the driver was killed. The two officers were injured.
2025-05-25	Rosamond Brookins (46)	White	Tampa, Florida	Hillsborough County Police initially responded to a burglary report and found Brookins, a grandmother who just shot her daughter. A deputy shot and killed her as she refused to follow commands and raised the gun. HCSO had released the bodycam footage.
2025-05-25	Kevin Reyes Portillo (31)	Unknown	Fontana, California	Police responded to a domestic dispute at an apartment building. The suspect allegedly pointed a gun at officers when they opened the door, leading them to fire.
2025-05-24	Billy Joe Faircloth Jr. (39)	Native American	Clinton, North Carolina	Sheriff's deputies pursued a motorcyclist, Faircloth, for a registration violation. Faircloth crashed, and deputies shot and killed him after he allegedly pulled a gun on them.
2025-05-23	Dustin Pearson (32)	White	Midvale, Utah	Unified Police responded to a robbery and encountered the suspect, Pearson. Officers shot and killed him after he walked toward them with a knife, reportedly tried to commit suicide by cop, after tasers failed to stop him. On January 30, 2026, District Attorney Sim Gill justified the officers' actions and also released the video.
2025-05-23	Albizo Rodrigues (64)	Hispanic	Houston, Texas	A security guard called Houston police to report a man threatening people with a bat in the Spring Branch neighborhood. An officer located Rodrigues and shot him after he picked up a piece of concrete and threatened them with it. Footage of the shooting was released on June 16th.
2025-05-22	Daniel Trujillo (37)	Hispanic	Albuquerque, New Mexico	Off-duty APD officers Ezekiel Florez and Krystal Garcia were riding a motorcycle when they hit a pedestrian, Trujillo, before leaving the scene. Trujillo died as a result. Krystal Garcia was convicted of knowingly leaving the scene of a crime and tampering with evidence. Florez plead guilty to the sentenced and received three years in prison to the same charges. Both officers had been fired from the department.
2025-05-22	Janidi Ibrahim (19)	Black	Omaha, Nebraska	A sheriff's deputy in North Omaha approached a vehicle with multiple suspects inside. Several of the suspects fled on foot, but Ibrahim remained in the SUV. For reasons unknown, the deputy shot into the vehicle, killing Ibrahim.
2025-05-22	Thomas Feminella (30)	White	Bartlett, Tennessee	Police responded to a shoplifting complaint with multiple suspects. One of the suspects, Feminella, allegedly walked towards officers with a knife, leading them to shoot him.
2025-05-21	Degeorge Darby (20)	Black	Woodfield, South Carolina	Police responded to reports of two men breaking into vehicles. Officers arrested one man, but shot the other, Darby, after he allegedly shot at them.
2025-05-21	Raymond Tellis Jr (19)	Black	Montgomery, Alabama	An Alabama Law Enforcement Agency agent attempted to arrest Tellis for an armed robbery. The agent shot and killed Tellis after he allegedly pulled a gun on the agent.
2025-05-21	Ezequiel Espinoza (22)	Hispanic	El Centro, California	Officers responded to reports of a burglary and shot the suspect when he pointed an object at an officer. The object was not a weapon despite one of the callers reported that the burglar had a firearm. The shooting is being investigating under a state law that requires all police killings where the decedent is unarmed to be investigated by the California Department of Justice. The footage of the shooting was released.
2025-05-21	Robert Edward Davis (65)	White	Coon Rapids, Minnesota	Police responded to reports of a domestic incident at a home involving a man with a knife. Following a stand-off, SWAT officers entered the home. Police hit the man with less-lethal rounds, then shot and tased him.
2025-05-21	Bruce Garcia	Hispanic	Philadelphia, Pennsylvania	Police shot and killed Garcia after an altercation. Police said Garcia had a gun that discharged.
2025-05-21	Juan Jose Rivera-Robles (37)	Hispanic	Plano, Texas	Police responded to a call that a woman had been shot in a home. Officer shot and killed Rivera-Robles after he exited the home and allegedly fired at them.
2025-05-20	Joseph Del Rivo (63)	White	Richfield, Utah	A Las Vegas murder suspect led troopers on a chase in Utah. His car crashed after he tried to avoid a second spike strip. He was killed by the impact.
2025-05-20	Jerry D. Smith (37)	Unknown	Columbus, Ohio	CPD received a call about a man assaulting a woman. When SWAT team came, Smith held a female hostage. After Smith opened the apartment door and raised his gun, SWAT members shot and killed him. Police had released the bodycam footage.
2025-05-18	unidentified male (21)	Unknown	St. Charles, Missouri	A suspect who fled a traffic stop caused a collision with another vehicle at an intersection. He then fled on foot with a handgun and was shot dead by police.
2025-05-18	Case Chrouser (38)	Unknown	Lake Havasu City, Arizona	Deputies attempted to arrest Chrouser at his home for a domestic violence incident the previous day in Topock. Following a stand-off, SWAT officers entered the home and shot Chrouser after he exited the bathroom and shot at them.
2025-05-18	Brandon Davenport (32)	Black	Shreveport, Louisiana	A woman called police to report a gun-wielding man attempted to carjack her. Responding officers located and shot the suspect when the suspect pointed an airsoft gun at them. The footage was released. No officers will be charged.
2025-05-18	Glenn Pettie (41)	White	Dundalk, Maryland	Baltimore County officers shot and killed Pettie after responding to a welfare check for mental health. Pettie fired at them when they arrived. Police released the bodycam footage.
2025-05-17	Michael Dziedzic (30)	White	Houston, Texas	Houston Police responded to a crash involving two vehicles, whose drivers both said a green SUV caused the accident. Officers found the SUV nearby and spoke to the driver, who officials believe was intoxicated. Police shot and killed the driver when he attempted to pull a gun on them. Police had released the bodycam footage.
2025-05-17	Benjamin Roberts (34)	White	Alger, Washington	Police pursued a stolen motorcycle from Mount Vernon to Cain Lake in southern Whatcom County. Roberts took a boat onto the lake and allegedly fired at officers, who shot and killed him.
2025-05-17	Danny Palomino (45)	Hispanic	Austin, Texas	A man in a wheelchair pointed a Glock BB gun at APD officers and drivers on a bridge before being shot and killed after ignoring commands to stop. Police had released the bodycam footage.
2025-05-16	Earnest Duke Harrison (33)	Unknown	Houston, Texas	HPD officers responded to a robbery and encountered Harrison, who matched the description and was armed with a machete. An officer shot him after he approached them with the machete. He died a few days later. HPD released the bodycam footage of the fatal shooting.
2025-05-16	Alricko Trimble, Jr. (21)	Black	Chattanooga, Tennessee	Trimble, the driver of a vehicle, began to ram other vehicles and tried to escape after CPD officers attempted to make contact with him and other individuals in the vehicle. At least one officer opened fire as situation escalated. A passenger and an officer sustained injuries.
2025-05-16	Stephen Mason (41)	Black	Detroit, Michigan	During a traffic stop, the suspect fired several shots at a MSP trooper, striking him. The trooper returned fire and killed the suspect.
2025-05-16	Ronald Evans (54)	White	Macon, Georgia	A Putnam County deputy attempted to pull over Evans, who appeared to be drunk and wasn't wearing a seatbelt, but he fled. The chase eventually ended in a store parking lot, where the deputy shot him dead as he exited the vehicle and pointed a gun at him. Putnam County Sheriff shared the footage on May 16.
2025-05-16	Tyrone Devon Henderson Bartley (32)	Black	Orlando, Florida	Orange County SWAT team served a search warrant at a drug house. While they were clearing the rooms, they encountered a man in a bedroom who reached for a rifle behind a door. A deputy then fatally shot him. The footage was released on June 4.
2025-05-16	Jose Gonzalez Ramos (23)	Hispanic	Los Angeles, California	Gonzalez Ramos stabbed his wife to death in North Hollywood neighborhood. Responding officers shot and killed him when he approached them with a knife. The bodycam footage was released by LAPD.
2025-05-16	Daniel Ortega (34)	Hispanic	Las Vegas, Nevada	Ortega opened fire with a rifle at a gym, killing one person and wounding three others in an active shooter incident. He was shot and killed by officers as he left the gym.
2025-05-16	unidentified male	Unknown	Alma, Arkansas	Officers encountered a suspected reckless driver connected to a domestic violence incident and an armed robbery at a travel center. The individual was shot and killed after he allegedly pulled out a handgun and refused to drop it.
2025-05-15	Dennis Bell	Black	Houston, Texas	Officers responded to a suicide in progress call and were charged by a man with a knife. The man was shot by officers and pronounced dead at Ben Taub Hospital. HPD had released the footage.
2025-05-14	Joshua Farmer (19)	Black	Durham, North Carolina	When a homicide suspect in police headquarters was about to be transported, he lunged toward a DPD officer and took his gun. A struggle ensued. During which, the gun went off, killing the suspect.
2025-05-14	unidentified male (49)	Unknown	Montrose, Michigan	Flint narcotics conducted a search warrant at a residence with several departments involved. During which, a man confronted them with a shotgun. A state trooper fatally shot the man after he refused to drop it. Another woman was also injured by the trooper's gunfire.
2025-05-14	Sean Ybarra (35)	Hispanic	Greeley, Colorado	A man who was threatening people with a knife was shot dead by a GPD officer after he approached him with it.
2025-05-14	Andrew Mate (38)	White	South San Francisco, California	Police received reports of a man who was acting erratically and tried to break into a public bathroom. During the encounter, police shot him as he pointed a fake gun at them. The footage was released by police.
2025-05-14	Alfredo (about 60)	Hispanic	Visalia, California	A pedestrian was struck and killed by a Visalia police cruiser.
2025-05-14	Calixto Beavenutti (44)	White	Jacksonville, Florida	Beavenutti, a man who fired shots and yelling in the neighborhood, started an hours-long standoff with SWAT team members. SWAT team members shot him when he carried a gun and attempted to enter a neighbor's home. The footage was released by police.
2025-05-13	Donnell Hogan (42)	Black	Syracuse, New York	SPD Officers responded to an active shooter incident in an apartment building. When they found Hogan in a wheelchair holding a gun, he fired shots at them. One officer returned fire. The bodycam footage was released.
2025-05-13	Damon Louther (25)	Black	New York City, New York	NYPD responded to a domestic abuse call in Brownsville, Brooklyn and encountered a man who was armed with a knife. The man approached officers with it before being shot twice. The footage was released.
2025-05-12	Jai Marc Howell (26)	Black	Baltimore, Maryland	As BPD officers approached Howell for questioning, he ran away and began shooting at police, hitting an occupied police vehicle. Officers fired back and killed him. Bodycam video of Howell's death was released on May 23.
2025-05-12	Rashaud Terrelle Johnson (32)	Black	Aurora, Colorado	An Aurora police officer fatally shot a man during a struggle after responding to reports of a suspicious trespasser. The officer tased him twice but ineffective. APD had released the bodycam footage.
2025-05-12	Utuva Alaelua (41)	Pacific Islander	Anchorage, Alaska	Alaelua was pulled over by officers for a broken headlight. Bodycam footage shows that he had a gun in his lap before being shot. Alaelua's brother, Puipuia Lipoi Alaelua, was shot and killed by Anchorage police in February. APD released the footage.
2025-05-12	Thomas Bean (36)	Unknown	Fairbanks, Alaska	Police were drawn to an altercation between two men that ended in one of the two men fatally shooting the other. The suspect the fired at the officers using a semi-automatic rifle, striking their patrol cars, so the officers would then fatally shoot the suspect after an exchange of gunfire ensued.
2025-05-11	Phillip Stokes Jr. (19)	Black	Natchez, Mississippi	While officers were serving attempted murder warrant on Stokes, he opened fire on them. Officers returned fire. He ultimately died four days later.
2025-05-11	Patrick Kanonczyk (36)	White	Millcreek Township, Pennsylvania	Officers encountered a man striking cars with a hammer in a parking lot. The man, Kanonczyk, allegedly threw his hammer at officers and advanced at officers with another weapon before they deployed a Taser. When the Taser failed to work, officers shot and killed him.
2025-05-11	Tadarius Milan Hunt (29)	Black	Nashville, Tennessee	When a staff member at a homeless shelter told Hunt, a resident, that he had to leave a room or he would contact police, Hunt threatened him and left. As the staff member left the building, he was shot and critically wounded by Hunt. The following day, Hunt fired at officers as they attempted to arrest him, wounding one officer, before he was killed by return fire. Police had released the bodycam footage.
2025-05-10	unidentified female	Unknown	Duchesne, Utah	A woman pointed a gun at deputies when they responded to a domestic violence call. A deputy fired his gun, killing her.
2025-05-10	Ricardo Ware (44)	Unknown	Shreveport, Louisiana	A woman called the police to report that a man shot and killed her husband. SPD officers shot and killed the suspect when he fired at them. The six taser deployments all failed. The footage was released and no officers involved will be charged.
2025-05-09	Jack Lagerwey (55)	Unknown	Kingman, Arizona	Mohave County deputies responded to a report of a man pouring gasoline inside his home. A standoff then ensued. At some point, the suspect pointed a gun at SWAT team members before being shot.
2025-05-09	Curtis Russell	White	Cushing, Oklahoma	A convicted felon was chased by Cushing Police after fleeing in a car. When a Lincoln County deputy located him, he began firing at him. A backup OHP trooper then shot him dead. A semi-automatic pistol and a rifle was found at the scene.
2025-05-09	James Carter (61)	Unknown	St. Louis, Missouri	St. Louis Police and ATF responded to a ShotSpotter notification. Upon arrival, a man confronted them with a rifle and fired it at them, prompting an ATF agent and an officer to return fire, killing him. Three other homicide victims were later found dead inside the home when SWAT team entered.
2025-05-08	Valerie Ann Cadwallader (48)	Unknown	Butte Creek Canyon, California	Cadwallader reportedly pointed a rifle at the Butte County deputies as they responded to a disturbance report. A deputy fired one shot, killing her.
2025-05-08	Philip Aiken Brown (53)	Unknown	Durham, North Carolina	A man with an arrest warrant fled the police after giving them false information. He later crashed his truck into an embankment. When state troopers demanded him to show his hands, he held a black object and a trooper shot him.
2025-05-08	Ashton LaVan (17)	Black	Cloverleaf, Texas	A shootout erupted between two groups of people on the night of May 8. 2 teenagers fled to an off-duty officer's backyard and attempted to enter the home. The officer then opened fire, killing one and wounding another.
2025-05-08	Lierme Reyes (34)	Hispanic	Dimmitt, Texas	During a trespassing investigation, a shootout occurred between the suspect, Reyes, and Castro County deputies. Deputies shot and killed him. One deputy was shot and injured.
2025-05-08	Joseph Navarro (50)	Unknown	Hammond, Indiana	Chicago Police chased a aggravated battery suspect to Hammond, where he crashed his vehicle. The suspect then fired at the officers. They returned fire. Police had released the bodycam footage.
2025-05-08	Josiah Perrault (18)	Hispanic	Las Cruces, New Mexico	Parrault was reportedly chasing two other teens with a gun and fired at them. A LCPD officer in his unit came to intervene and shot Perrault dead when he aimed the gun at him. One teen was injured during the incident.
2025-05-07	Santrina Lester (28)	Black	Deerfield Beach, Florida	Broward County deputies responded to a call about a woman pointing a gun at another person. They found the suspect in a vehicle and fatally shot her after she produced a gun.
2025-05-07	Justin Moegling (41)	White	Poulsbo, Washington	After a pursuit, Kitsap County deputies and Poulsbo officers shot and killed Moegling, who exited his vehicle with a large knife and approached them. Pepper balls and tasers were ineffective. The bodycam footage was released.
2025-05-07	Breanna Wilkerson (25)	White	Farmington, New Mexico	US Marshals were attempting to arrest Roe, who was wanted for three felony charges. During which Wilkerson pulled over nearby. Roe then climbed into driver's seat of the vehicle and veered toward marshals, at which point they opened fire, killing them both.
2025-05-07	Brandon Roe (37)	White	Farmington, New Mexico	US Marshals were attempting to arrest Roe, who was wanted for three felony charges. During which Wilkerson pulled over nearby. Roe then climbed into driver's seat of the vehicle and veered toward marshals, at which point they opened fire, killing them both.
2025-05-07	Vanessa Eugene (19)	Unknown	Oak Ridge, Florida	Orange County Police received a call from someone claiming to have been battered and strangled. When the deputies arrived, they heard screaming so they broke into the front door and cleared the rooms. At which point, Eugene ran out from a room and charged at one of them with a knife, resulting in two of the deputies fatally shot her. The bodycam footage was released.
2025-05-07	Marc Fogle (54)	White	Ridgefield, Washington	Fogle was taken to a police station for DUI. While he was in the room, he tried to reach for the Clark County deputy's gun. During the fight, the deputy stabbed him to death. Police had released the bodycam footage.
2025-05-06	Jemmie Earl Hicks Jr. (33)	Unknown	Union Springs, Alabama	A driver refused to stop and a pursuit involving state troopers ensued. After the chase, the man, Hicks, was shot dead by troopers.
2025-05-06	unidentified male	Unknown	Iraan, Texas	A man was chased by Pecos County deputies after shooting one of them during a traffic stop. After the pursuit, the suspect was killed in a shootout with them, according to Texas DPS.
2025-05-06	Dennis Ritchie Jones (75)	White	Truth or Consequences, New Mexico	During a traffic stop, New Mexico State Police attempted to arrest Jones for a sexual assault warrant in Arizona. When the trooper approached, he fired at the trooper and fled, which led to a chase. He was shot and killed following a standoff with state troopers. Bodycam footage shows that he pointed a gun at them.
2025-05-05	Tasha Grant (39)	Black	Cleveland, Ohio	Grant, an inmate at the Cuyahoga County Jail, was taken to the MetroHealth Medical Center for chest pains on May 2. Three days later, medical staff called for assistance after Grant, who had both legs amputated years prior, threw herself on the ground and refused to cooperate. Three MetroHealth Police officers and a sheriff's deputy restrained Grant on her stomach before handcuffing her to her bed. She was found unresponsive, and her death was declared a homicide.
2025-05-05	James Peterson (50)	Unknown	Woodward, Oklahoma	Peterson fled a traffic stop which led to a police chase. During the pursuit, WPD officers performed TVI on his car, causing it to crash into a tree, killing Peterson.
2025-05-05	Stefan R. Gerenscer (39)	Unknown	Fishersville, Virginia	A man was arrested for public intoxication and had a physical altercation with a deputy. The deputy managed to secure him in the police vehicle. When they arrived at the jail, the man was found dead inside the police vehicle.
2025-05-05	Cody Alexander Burke (28)	White	Kingsport, Tennessee	
2025-05-05	Elejandro Jose Colburn (31)	Hispanic	Muskegon Heights, Michigan	
2025-05-05	Allen "Noochie" Credeur (49)	White	Rayne, Louisiana	Rayne Police Lieutenant Credeur and other officers were serving a search warrant related to a stabbing when Credeur was struck by friendly fire.
2025-05-05	Jesse LaMoine Anderson (24)	White	Orem, Utah	Members of a police task force shot and killed a man while serving a warrant at the home of a suspected drug dealer.
2025-05-05	Ishmael Dennis (56)	Black	Houston, Texas	A man was sleeping in an SUV in a medical facility parking lot and refused to leave. In order to remove him out of the car, deputies broke the window, opened the door, tased him and pulled him out. He then armed himself with a knife before two deputies shot and killed him. Harris County Sheriff's Office released the bodycam footage in June.
2025-05-05	Mark Vawter (65)	White	Danville, Indiana	Deputies who were transporting inmates from a jail to a courthouse when Vawter, who was waiting outside, fired a shot at them. Deputies returned fire and killed him. Vawter's family said they believed he was targeting a man who was charged with killing two of Vawter's great-grandchildren in a crash in February.
2025-05-05	Alfonzo Wright (47)	Black	Chicago, Illinois	Wright was shot by CPD officers inside his apartment at an assisted living facility after approaching them with a butcher knife the Grand Crossing neighborhood. A few hours later, 58-year-old Keith Harding, was found dead in the same apartment with stab wounds. Bodycam video of Wright's death was released by COPA on June 4th.
2025-05-05	Martez Hunter (23)	Black	Detroit, Michigan	Undercover State troopers shot and killed Hunter on Detroit's west side. Police said troopers were conducting an operation when Hunter exited a nearby vehicle and fired at them, striking one trooper, before he was shot and killed by other troopers.
2025-05-04	Dinella Hutsell (37)	White	Hughson, California	Off-duty Stanislaus County Sheriff's Sgt. Daniel Hutsell along with his wife were killed in a murder-suicide. Daniel Hutsell is also one of the SWAT team members who was involved in a fatal police shooting on July 17th, 2019.
2025-05-04	Thurman Wilson (21)	Black	Tulsa, Oklahoma	Two suspects opened fire on a crowd in downtown Tulsa after an altercation, wounding five people. Responding TPD officers fired back, killing one of them, Wilson.
2025-05-04	Marlon Anderson (50)	White	Racine, Wisconsin	Police pursued a man in connection with a domestic assault earlier in the day. After the man crashed, officers shot him when he raised a firearm towards the officers. The footage was released by DOJ.
2025-05-04	Michael Lee Wright (40)	White	Jacksonville, Florida	A woman called police to report her boyfriend, Wright, had attacked her. A responding officer struck Wright with his vehicle, pushing him into a nearby yard, before the officer exited his SUV and shot him. The officer yelled for Wright to drop an object, but it is unclear what Wright was holding.
2025-05-04	James Daniel Webster Jr. (34)	White	Simpsonville, South Carolina	Deputies responded to a domestic violence report at a home. A deputy shot and killed Webster after he allegedly exited the home with a firearm.
2025-05-02	John A. Cox (22)	White	Harriman, Tennessee	During a burglary call, a deputy shot and killed Cox, who was allegedly brandishing a rock. On May 19, a grand jury recommended the deputy involved be charged with negligent homicide.
2025-05-02	Gregory Williams (42)	White	New Orleans, Louisiana	An officer working a security detail at Walmart was called to assist Williams, who was overdosing in a truck in the parking lot. After giving him Narcan, the officer was asking Williams questions when he drove off with the officer's clothes stuck in the doorway. The truck hit a pedestrian, who suffered an injured leg. The officer then shot and killed Williams.
2025-05-02	Norbal Garcia (58)	Hispanic	Jacksonville, Florida	An officer responded to a report of a fight and found Garcia standing over two injured people holding two butcher knives. The officer shot and killed Garcia when he tried to further attack the two victims.
2025-05-01	Dustin J. Johnson (36)	Unknown	Riverside, Missouri	Police responded to a domestic violence shooting call about Johnson shooting at a woman's current husband. He managed to flee the scene which led to a pursuit. After police disabled his rented U-haul truck, he pointed a gun at police and was fatally shot.
2025-05-01	Orlin Manuel Bueso Calderon (25)	Hispanic	Orlando, Florida	Calderon went in a 7-Eleven gas station and began waving a fake gun. When OPD officers arrived, he did not follow commands and five officers shot him. The footage had been released.
2025-05-01	Gregory Painter (44)	Unknown	Milton, Delaware	Delaware State Police troopers responded to a report about a possible impaired driver. When troopers arrived, Painter fled and armed himself with a knife. At some point after the chase, he charged at them with the knife before being fatally shot.
2025-05-01	Kenneth D. Smith (55)	Black	Lafayette, Indiana	Lafayette Police officers were dispatched to escort a woman and her son out of a domestic violence situation. Upon arrival, they engaged in a shootout with the suspect. One officer returned fire and killed the shooter. Officers involved were cleared by prosecutor's office.
2025-05-01	Jeremy Coyle (44)	White	Eureka Springs, Arkansas	Police served a warrant on Coyle in relation to sexual assault charges. A SWAT officer shot and killed Coyle after he allegedly raised a gun towards police.
2025-05-01	Ryan Hinton (18)	Black	Cincinnati, Ohio	Two Cincinnati officers encountered four suspects in a stolen vehicle out of Kentucky. When officers were pursuing the suspects, one of them, Hinton, pointed a handgun at officers before being shot dead. The footage had been released. One day later, Hinton's father, Rodney Hinton Jr, was charged in the killing of Hamilton County Sheriff's Deputy Larry Henderson after striking him with his vehicle.

== See also ==
- Death in custody § United States
- Henry A. Wallace Police Crime Public Database
- List of cases of police brutality
- List of countries with annual rates and counts for killings by law enforcement officers
- List of law enforcement officers killed in the line of duty in the United States
- List of law enforcement officers convicted for an on-duty killing in the United States
- List of shootings by US immigration agents
- List of police reforms related to the George Floyd protests
- List of unarmed African Americans killed by law enforcement officers in the United States
- Lists of killings by law enforcement officers
- Police brutality in the United States
- Police misconduct § United States
- Police riot § United States
- Police use of deadly force in the United States
