= Stirling City =

Stirling City may refer to:

- The city of Stirling, Scotland, United Kingdom
- Stirling City, California, United States

== See also ==
- Sterling City, Texas, United States
