= Paradise, California =

Town in California, United States

- Town
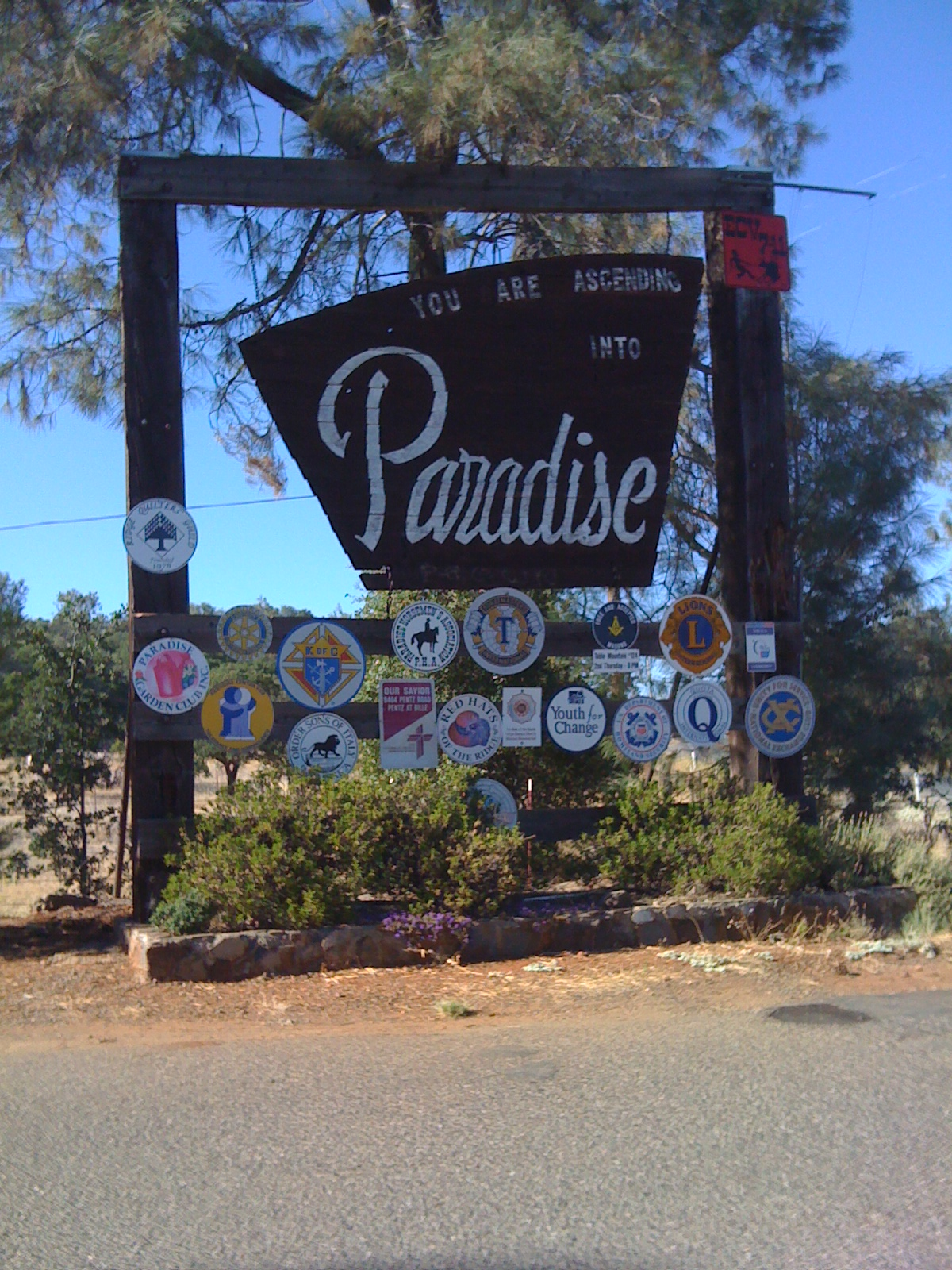
- Welcome to Paradise sign in 2011

- Flag Seal Logo
- Nickname: the Ridge
- Interactive map of Paradise, California
- Coordinates: 39°45′35″N 121°37′19″W
- Country: United States
- State: California
- County: Butte
- Incorporated: November 27, 1979

Government
  - Mayor: Steve Crowder

Area
  - Total: 18.33 sq mi (47.47 km^{2})
  - Land: 18.32 sq mi (47.44 km^{2})
  - Water: 0.012 sq mi (0.03 km^{2}) 0.08%
- Elevation: 1,778 ft (542 m)

Population (2020)
  - Total: 4,764
  - Estimate (2025): 10,023
  - Density: 244.4/sq mi (94.35/km^{2})
- Time zone: UTC-8 (Pacific)
  - Summer (DST): UTC-7 (PDT)
- ZIP codes: 95967, 95969
- Area code: 530, 837
- FIPS code: 06-55520
- GNIS ID: 277573
- Website: www.paradiseca.gov

Paradise is an incorporated town in Butte County, California, United States, in the Sierra Nevada foothills above the northeastern Sacramento Valley. As of the 2020 census, the town population was 4,764, a decline of over 80% from the 26,218 residents recorded in the 2010 census.

On November 8, 2018, a major wildfire, the Camp Fire, killed 85 people and destroyed much of Paradise and Magalia, as well as most of Butte Creek Canyon and Concow. In November 2023, it was reported that there were a little over 9,000 residents living in Paradise, roughly double the number from three years prior. Over 2,500 new structures had also been built, with more construction ongoing.

== History ==
The first post office was established at Paradise in 1877. It closed for a time in 1911, but was re-established later that year, when the post office at Orloff was closed. Paradise incorporated in 1979. For many years, the Butte County Railroad operated trains along the ridge, serving mines and sawmills.

=== Naming ===
According to GNIS, the community has been known in the past by four different names or spellings: Leonards Mill, Poverty Ridge, Pair-O-Dice, and Paradice.

A legend persists that the town was named because it was the home of the Pair o' Dice Saloon, an idea supported by a 1900 railroad map referring to the town as Paradice. However, no documentation has been found to prove the establishment existed, nor an explanation of the spelling of the town's name on the map.

Gene Sylva, a former mayor of the nearby town of Oroville, has stated that the saloon story is false, and that the true etymology of the town's name can be traced to his great-great-grandfather, William Pierce Leonard, who named the town on a summer day in 1864, after a hot and dusty ride from the Sacramento Valley; arriving at his sawmill while the staff were on break, Leonard "took a deep breath of the cool, clean air, and exclaimed, 'boys, this is paradise.'" According to Snopes, Sylva's explanation may be "pleasingly inventive historical fiction", and it is more likely that the town was named for it being a pleasant place to live.

=== 2008 fires ===
In June 2008, a wildfire, named the "Humboldt Fire" for its point of origin, swept over 22,800 acres (9,200 ha) of land between Chico and Paradise. As many as 9,300 people were forced to evacuate southwestern Paradise until the fire could be brought under control.

A month later, a fire burned on the northern side of Paradise in the canyon where the Feather River is located. Again, thousands were evacuated from their homes, but the fire failed to cross the river. It was part of a larger complex of fires called the Butte Lightning Complex or BTU Complex, which also included the Belden and Pit fires. (This was a different fire from the 2018 fire of the same name.)

=== 2018 fire ===
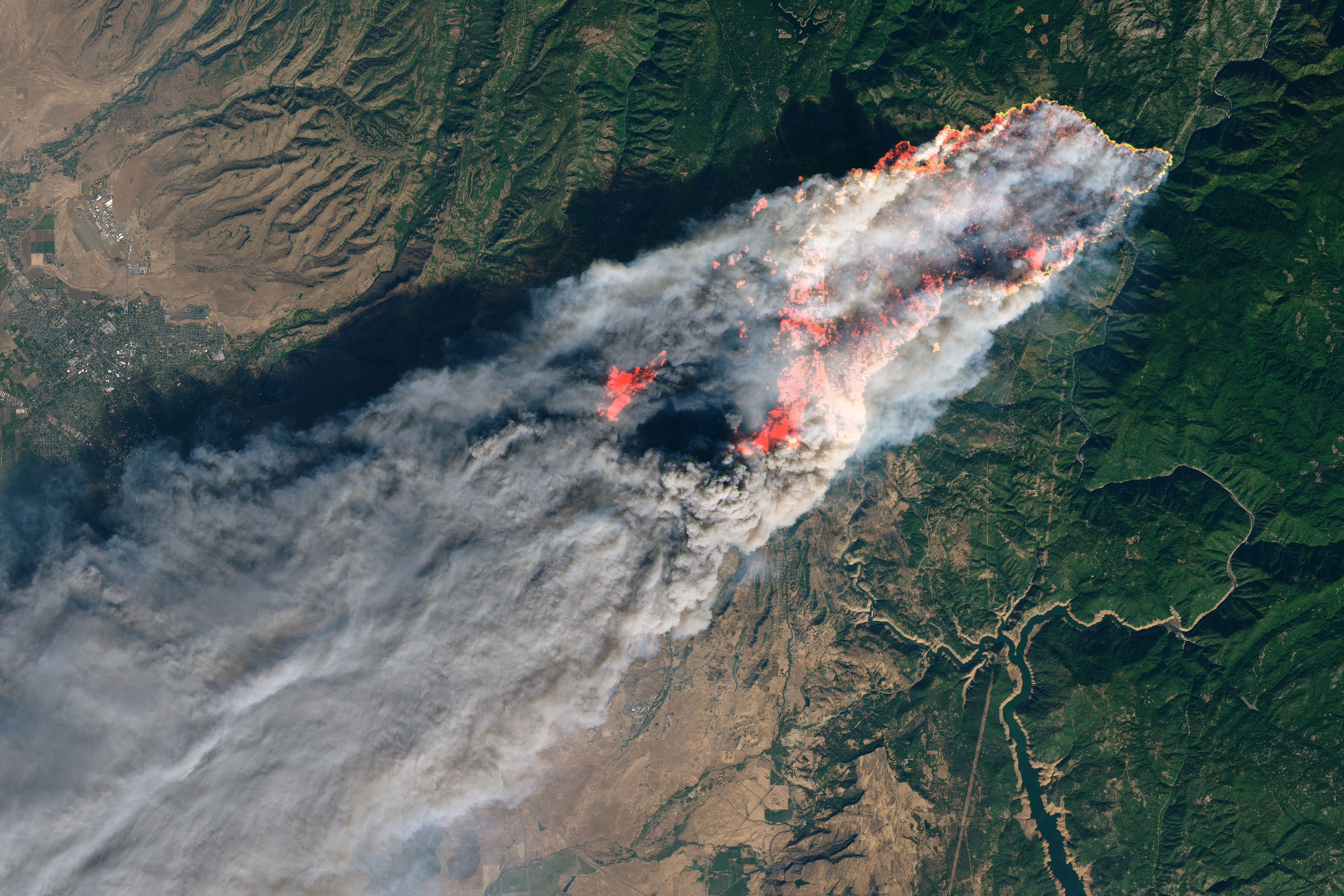
Satellite image showing the fire at 10:45 a.m. on November 8, 2018

On November 8, 2018, a wildfire named the "Camp Fire" was reported at 6:33 a.m. PST, close to Camp Creek Road near Pulga. Shortly after the fire erupted, the Butte County Sheriff's Office ordered the evacuation of the eastern quarter of Paradise, and the remaining portions one hour later. However, many residents never received an evacuation warning, while others chose not to leave because the warnings did not convey the urgency of the situation. Other locations were also issued evacuation orders or warnings, and emergency shelters were established.

Large parts of the towns of Paradise and Magalia were destroyed by the fire, along with most of Concow. Scott McLean, a Cal Fire Deputy Chief, said, "We're talking devastated... . The town center is completely on the ground. The south side as well as the north side has been hit very hard, as well."

A total of 85 people died in the Camp Fire, tens of thousands were displaced, and 18,804 buildings were destroyed. Only 5% of buildings in the town remained without serious damage after the fire. It was the deadliest and most destructive fire in California history. Negligence on the part of Pacific Gas & Electric (PG&E) was found to be the cause of the fire.

==== Camp Fire recovery ====
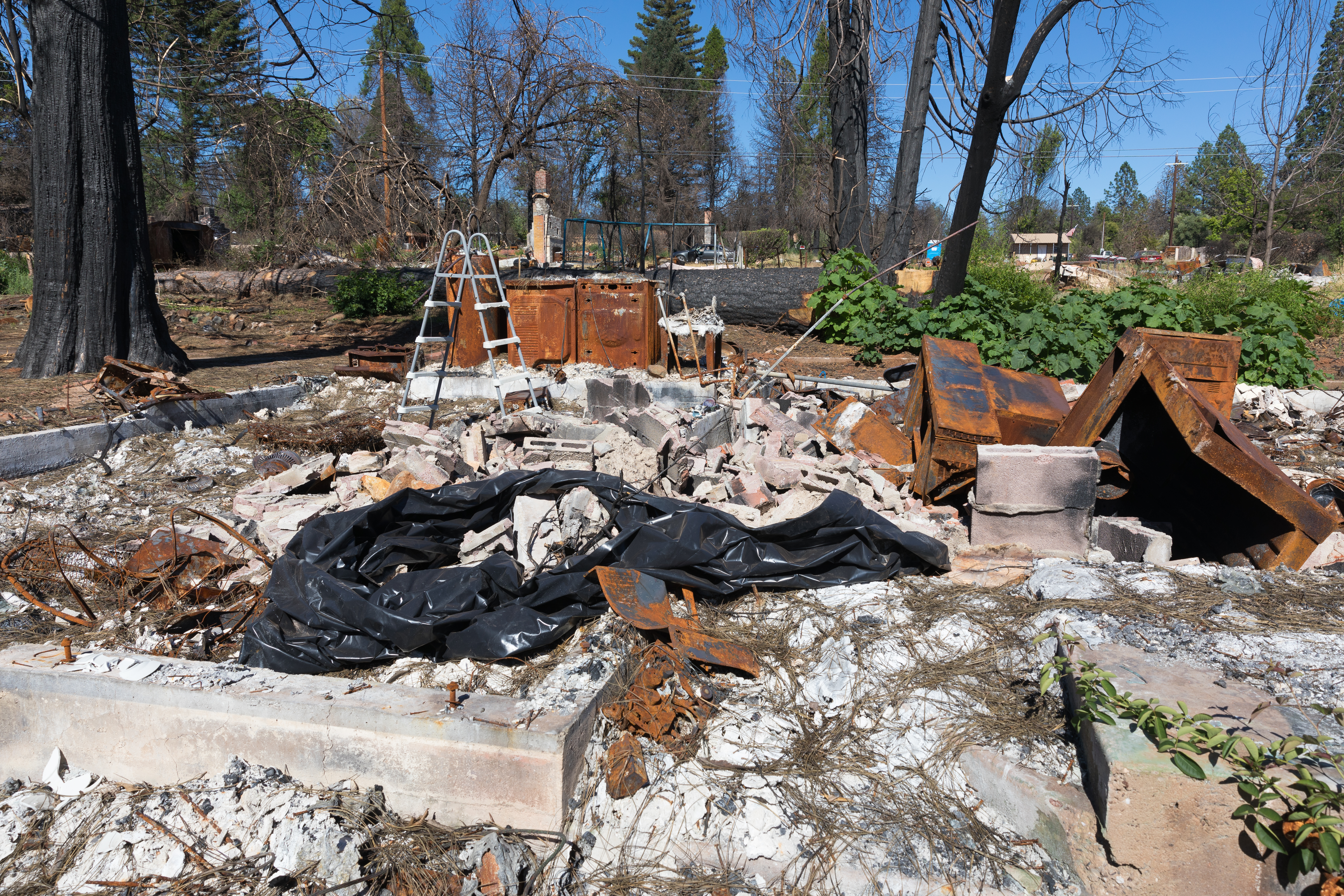
A burnt-down house in Paradise, eight months after the Camp Fire

The first two building permits were reissued for Paradise, after almost five months, on March 28, 2019. Local public policymakers aimed to promote rebuilding with higher standards for fire-resistant construction, upgraded infrastructure, and using the recommended 2009 redesigns for enhanced fire safety, which include expanded road capacity to increase evacuation capacity and to provide better access for emergency equipment. Two weeks of rain in early March 2019 slowed removal of debris; it was prohibited to dump waterlogged waste in landfills. Some 1,000 truckloads of material were expected to be removed daily from properties in Paradise, Concow, and Magalia. Cleanup was anticipated to take a year, involving 11,000 properties.

In 2010 the U.S. census reported a population of 26,800. After the Camp Fire, the population declined by more than 90%. In January 2019, the state of California reported 4,600 residents, and a door-to-door count in April 2019 found 2,034. In the ensuing years, however, more residents have slowly returned to the town. By November 2023, it was reported that there were a little over 9,000 residents living in Paradise. Over 2,500 new structures had also been built, with more construction ongoing.

By 2024, the town had experienced a substantial influx of newcomers who had moved from the Bay Area and Southern California. Building codes had changed, so displaced residents could not rebuild under codes that had formerly allowed homes smaller than 750 square feet (70 m^{2}). Insurance costs had exploded, with annual premiums of $12,000 becoming commonplace.

One year after the fires, the town united behind the Paradise High School football team, which achieved an undefeated season. One team member commented, "You look at the stands, the whole town of Paradise is here, so it's really our only event right now, so it means everything." Paradise Mayor Jody Jones said, "The football team has come to represent all of us.” Los Angeles Times columnist Bill Plaschke was inspired to write a book about the team and the town, Paradise Found: A High School Football Team's Rise from the Ashes (2021).

==== Paradise Greenbelt Buffer Plan ====
After the 2018 Camp Fire caused near complete destruction of Paradise, the town and residents agreed on a Long-Term Community Recovery Plan with five main goals to make the town Safer, Welcoming, Stronger, Better, and Greener. Paradise Recreation and Parks District (PRPD) and the Nature Conservancy teamed up to develop the idea of a Greenbelt defensible buffer zone which would make the town a better fire-adapted community by preventing future wildfires from reaching the town center. The greenbelt would be made up of managed parks and vegetation to allow firefighters to do controlled burns and create a barrier of land without fuel around the town (a firebreak) so future wildfires have no path inwards. This borderland would serve as a source of recreation and greenspace for the community. During the wildfire season, the buffer would protect the town.

The Greenbelt hopes to accomplish a number of projects outlined in the plan, including improvements to parks and walking paths, a stronger fuel management plan, and better transportation access for residents and firefighters. The Nature Conservancy hired an independent nonprofit, the Conservation Biology Institute, to conduct a scientific report on the efficacy of such a barrier. According to their models, such greening of the eastern border of Paradise could reduce combustion risks in the town by as much as 64%.

The most pressing challenges moving forward included obtaining rights to the mostly private land the Conservation Biology Institute identified as the most ideal location for a greenbelt, and funding the purchase of these properties. With local fires worsening every year, PRDP is hoping residents will respond to their fire risk reduction models and sell their outskirt properties to the district. With the successful purchase of several properties so far, Dan Efseaff, district manager for PRDP, "hopes at least to create pockets or sections of that full vision." If this becomes a successful model, the Nature Conservancy hopes to scale up lessons learned from Paradise and inspire other fire-threatened communities to implement their own buffers.

=== 2020 North Complex Fire ===
The North Complex Fire, also known as the "Bear Fire," to the east of Concow, and Pulga endangered Paradise and surrounding communities that had been affected by the 2018 Camp Fire, and evacuations were ordered. Remaining burn scars that had reduced combustible materials contained the westward progress of the 2020 fire, though almost 320,000 acres (130,000 ha) were consumed before it was contained.

== Geography ==
Paradise is located 10 miles (16 km)east of Chico and 85 miles (137 km) north of Sacramento.

The town is spread out on a wide ridge between deep canyons formed by the west branch of the Feather River to the east and Butte Creek to the west. The Paradise area extends northward to include the unincorporated town of Magalia, as well as Stirling City, eleven miles (18 km) north. Elevation of the area where the town is located is 1,778 feet (542 m). The town itself is approximately eight to ten miles (13 to 16 km) east of the city of Chico, and ten miles (16 km) north of the Oroville area.

According to the United States Census Bureau, the town has a total area of 18.3 square miles (47 km^{2}); over 99% of it is land.

Soils are mostly well-drained reddish-brown loam, gravelly in some cases and often grading to clay loam or clay with increasing depth. They have developed on volcanic material. Paradiso is by far the most common soil series in town.

=== Climate ===
The area encompassing Paradise has a hot-summer Mediterranean climate (Csa) according to the Köppen climate classification system. This area is characterized by hot, dry summers and cool, rainy winters. Because of its elevation and up-sloping topography, which create orographic precipitation, Paradise has a much wetter climate than neighboring Chico, which is only about 10 miles distant but receives less than half the precipitation of Paradise. Paradise is also subject to occasional snowfall in winter, while snow is very rare in Chico.

Climate data for Paradise, California (1957-2012)
Month	Jan	Feb	Mar	Apr	May	Jun	Jul	Aug	Sep	Oct	Nov	Dec	Year
Record high °F (°C)	79 (26)	81 (27)	83 (28)	90 (32)	101 (38)	106 (41)	108 (42)	113 (45)	108 (42)	100 (38)	90 (32)	79 (26)	113 (45)
Mean daily maximum °F (°C)	53.8 (12.1)	56.5 (13.6)	60.0 (15.6)	66.0 (18.9)	74.8 (23.8)	84.1 (28.9)	91.7 (33.2)	90.5 (32.5)	85.2 (29.6)	74.2 (23.4)	60.6 (15.9)	53.8 (12.1)	70.9 (21.6)
Daily mean °F (°C)	46.0 (7.8)	48.5 (9.2)	51.2 (10.7)	55.9 (13.3)	63.3 (17.4)	71.4 (21.9)	78.1 (25.6)	76.9 (24.9)	72.5 (22.5)	63.3 (17.4)	52.1 (11.2)	46.0 (7.8)	60.4 (15.8)
Mean daily minimum °F (°C)	38.1 (3.4)	40.4 (4.7)	42.4 (5.8)	45.8 (7.7)	51.8 (11.0)	58.7 (14.8)	64.4 (18.0)	63.4 (17.4)	59.7 (15.4)	52.3 (11.3)	43.6 (6.4)	38.1 (3.4)	49.9 (9.9)
Record low °F (°C)	18 (−8)	17 (−8)	25 (−4)	23 (−5)	32 (0)	40 (4)	42 (6)	41 (5)	38 (3)	29 (−2)	26 (−3)	14 (−10)	14 (−10)
Average precipitation inches (mm)	10.46 (266)	9.07 (230)	7.95 (202)	4.09 (104)	1.87 (47)	0.70 (18)	0.08 (2.0)	0.23 (5.8)	0.79 (20)	3.13 (80)	6.88 (175)	9.58 (243)	54.84 (1,393)
Average snowfall inches (cm)	1.0 (2.5)	0.3 (0.76)	0.3 (0.76)	0.0 (0.0)	0.0 (0.0)	0.0 (0.0)	0.0 (0.0)	0.0 (0.0)	0.0 (0.0)	0.0 (0.0)	0.0 (0.0)	0.4 (1.0)	2.0 (5.1)
Average precipitation days (≥ 0.01 in)	12.4	11.4	11.4	8.1	5.5	2.6	0.2	0.6	1.2	4.5	8.8	11.6	78.3
Average snowy days (≥ 0.1 in)	0.0	0.1	0.0	0.0	0.0	0.0	0.0	0.0	0.0	0.0	0.0	0.0	0.1
Source: Western Regional Climate Center

== Demographics ==
Historical population
Census	Pop.	Note	%±
1960	8,268		—
1970	14,539		75.8%
1980	22,571		55.2%
1990	25,408		12.6%
2000	26,408		3.9%
2010	26,218		−0.7%
2020	4,764		−81.8%
2025 (est.)	10,023		110.4%

Paradise is statistically classified within the Chico Metropolitan Area.

=== 2020 census ===
As of the 2020 census, Paradise had a population of 4,764 and a population density of 260.1 inhabitants per square mile (100.4/km^{2}). The median age was 55.6 years. 14.4% of residents were under the age of 18, 4.8% were aged 18 to 24, 18.6% were aged 25 to 44, 30.8% were aged 45 to 64, and 31.4% were 65 years of age or older. For every 100 females there were 101.1 males, and for every 100 females age 18 and over there were 100.9 males age 18 and over.

The census reported that 98.9% of the population lived in households, 0.6% lived in non-institutionalized group quarters, and 0.4% were institutionalized. In addition, 0.0% of residents lived in urban areas, while 100.0% lived in rural areas.

There were 2,172 households in Paradise, of which 21.8% had children under the age of 18 living in them. Of all households, 45.8% were married-couple households, 8.3% were cohabiting couple households, 21.5% were households with a male householder and no spouse or partner present, and 24.3% were households with a female householder and no spouse or partner present. About 31.0% of all households were made up of individuals and 17.8% had someone living alone who was 65 years of age or older. The average household size was 2.17. There were 1,317 families (60.6% of all households).

There were 2,493 housing units at an average density of 136.1 units per square mile (52.5 units/km^{2}). Of all housing units, 87.1% were occupied and 12.9% were vacant. Of occupied units, 74.6% were owner-occupied and 25.4% were occupied by renters. The homeowner vacancy rate was 1.8% and the rental vacancy rate was 7.1%.

Racial composition as of the 2020 census
Race	Number	Percent
White	4,075	85.5%
Black or African American	17	0.4%
American Indian and Alaska Native	46	1.0%
Asian	68	1.4%
Native Hawaiian and Other Pacific Islander	7	0.1%
Some other race	100	2.1%
Two or more races	451	9.5%
Hispanic or Latino (of any race)	419	8.8%

=== Income and poverty ===
In 2023, the US Census Bureau estimated that the median household income was $67,042, and the per capita income was $36,444. About 18.4% of families and 18.0% of the population were below the poverty line.

=== 2010 census ===
The 2010 United States census reported that Paradise had a population of 26,218. The population density was 1,430.9 inhabitants per square mile (552.5/km^{2}). The racial makeup of Paradise was 24,129 (92.0%) white, 112 (0.4%) African American, 301 (1.1%) Native American, 330 (1.3%) Asian, 24 (0.1%) Pacific Islander, 416 (1.6%) from other races, and 906 (3.5%) from two or more races. There were 1,836 people (7.0%) of Hispanic or Latino origin, of any race.

The Census reported that 25,810 people (98.4% of the population) lived in households, 139 (0.5%) lived in non-institutionalized group quarters, and 269 (1.0%) were institutionalized.

There were 11,893 households, out of which 2,574 (21.6%) had children under the age of 18 living in them, 5,227 (44.0%) were opposite-sex married couples living together, 1,308 (11.0%) had a female householder with no husband present, 511 (4.3%) had a male householder with no wife present. There were 742 (6.2%) unmarried opposite-sex partnerships, and 94 (0.8%) same-sex married couples or partnerships. 4,038 households (34.0%) were made up of individuals, and 2,126 (17.9%) had someone living alone who was 65 years of age or older. The average household size was 2.17. There were 7,046 families (59.2% of all households); the average family size was 2.73.

The age distribution was 4,501 people (17.2%) under the age of 18, 1,858 people (7.1%) aged 18 to 24, 4,822 people (18.4%) aged 25 to 44, 8,466 people (32.3%) aged 45 to 64, and 6,571 people (25.1%) who were 65 years of age or older. The median age was 50.2 years. For every 100 females, there were 90.5 males. For every 100 females age 18 and over, there were 88.5 males.

There were 12,981 housing units at an average density of 708.5 units per square mile (273.6 units/km^{2}), of which 11,893 were occupied, of which 7,975 (67.1%) were owner-occupied, and 3,918 (32.9%) were occupied by renters. The homeowner vacancy rate was 2.8%; the rental vacancy rate was 5.9%. 17,381 people (66.3% of the population) lived in owner-occupied housing units and 8,429 people (32.1%) lived in rental housing units.

== Government ==
The State of California Office of Statewide Health Planning and Development defined Feather River Hospital as a general acute care hospital (GACH) in Paradise with basic emergency care as of August 22, 2006. Since the 2018 Camp Fire, the hospital has been permanently closed, with no plans to reopen at this time.

== Education ==
Paradise is served by the Paradise Unified School District, as well as by several independent charter and private schools.

Paradise Unified School District schools include:

- Paradise High School (9–12)
  - The high school was virtually undamaged in the 2018 Camp Fire and reopened for the 2019–20 school year. Enrollment was expected to be about 600, but about 900 showed up for the first day of classes, with some displaced students traveling more than an hour each way.
- Ridgeview High School (continuation)
- HomeTech Charter School (K–12)
- Paradise Intermediate School (6–8)
- Paradise Charter Middle School (6–8)
- Children's Community Charter School (K–8)
- Cedarwood Elementary School (K–5)
- Paradise Elementary School (K–5)
- Ponderosa Elementary School (K–6)
- Pine Ridge School (K–8)
- Honey Run Academy Elementary & Secondary (2 community day schools)
- Pearson Center (school for 18-22-year-old significantly disabled special education students)

Other Paradise schools include:

- Achieve Charter School
- Paradise Adventist Academy
- Paradise Elearning Charter (Online 9–12)
- Butte College

== Transportation ==
There are not many options for transportation within Paradise. The Paradise/Magalia area is served by the "B-Line" Butte County Transit. Butte Community College also runs bus service for students.

Paradise's link with Chico, Skyway Road (referred to locally as simply "Skyway"), begins in the Sacramento Valley, at Highway 99 in Chico, and runs up the ridge as a four-lane divided highway until it reaches Paradise. Through the town, it is a four-lane undivided highway, which becomes a two-lane road as it continues up the Sierra's ridge to Magalia and into numerous smaller communities to the north. Paradise is connected to Oroville via Highway 191, otherwise known as Clark Road upon entering the town.

The Paradise Memorial Trail is a paved pedestrian and bicycle path which runs through town on the path of the former railroad tracks leading up the ridge. However, aside from points along this path, the very hilly terrain of the town, coupled with the large spacing of commercial areas and large land area made Paradise difficult to navigate on foot or on a bicycle, in addition to the lack of sidewalks.

Paradise Skypark (FAA identifier: CA92) is an airport located parallel to State Route 191 and south of the town.

== Media ==
Eclectic Internet radio station Radio Paradise was founded in Paradise.

The local newspaper is the Paradise Post.

== In popular culture ==
Scenes from the 1939 film Gone with the Wind were filmed in Paradise.

Season 4 Episode 31 Dead Man's Street from Tales of Wells Fargo is set in Paradise.

A 1959 Maverick episode, "The Cats of Paradise", is set in Paradise.

A 1988–1991 American Western family television series, Guns of Paradise, is set in Paradise.

Paradise was used in the comic strip Pickles, by Brian Crane, on June 22, 2011.

The 2020 film Rebuilding Paradise, directed by Ron Howard, is about the 2018 Camp Fire.

The PBS show This Old House season 41 included 4 episodes on rebuilding Paradise.

The 2025 film The Lost Bus, directed by Paul Greengrass, dramatizes when a school bus driver named Kevin McKay (Matthew McConaughey) drove 22 children to safety through the Camp Fire.

== Notable people ==
People who were born, grew up, or lived in Paradise for a portion of their lives or careers.

- Norton Buffalo (1951–2009), musician, artist, actor.
- Richard Campbell, musician.
- Carla Gugino, actress.
- Luther Kelly (1849–1928), soldier
- Lazy Lester, musician.
- Jeff Maehl, professional athlete
- Nate Smith, musician
