= Cecil Newton (disambiguation) =

Cecil Newton, Jr. (born 1986), is an American football center.

Cecil Newton may also refer to:

- Cecil Newton (Coronation Street), a fictional character
- Cecil Newton, Sr., father of NFL quarterback Cam Newton
