= Rebuilding Paradise =

- Theatrical release poster
- Directed by: Ron Howard
- Produced by: Ron Howard; Brian Grazer; Xan Parker; Sara Bernstein; Justin Wilkes
- Cinematography: Lincoln Else
- Edited by: M. Watanabe Milmore
- Music by: Hans Zimmer; Lorne Balfe
- Production company: Imagine Documentaries
- Distributed by: National Geographic Documentary Films; Abramorama
- Release dates: January 24, 2020 (Sundance); July 31, 2020 (United States); November 8, 2020 (National Geographic Channel)
- Running time: 95 minutes
- Country: United States
- Language: English

Rebuilding Paradise is a 2020 American documentary film directed and produced by Ron Howard. The film follows the rebuild of Paradise, California, following the 2018 California wildfires, specifically the Camp Fire, known as the deadliest and most destructive wildfire in California's history, and the most expensive natural disaster in the world in 2018 in terms of insured losses. The film was first announced in January 2019. Lincoln Else was the cinematographer, Hans Zimmer and Lorne Balfe composed the score.

Acquired by National Geographic Films, Rebuilding Paradise had its world premiere at the Sundance Film Festival on January 24, 2020, subsequently followed by theatrical and television release several months later. The former faced challenges due to the COVID-19 pandemic. It later also saw digital and home media releases. The film received universal critical acclaim for its portrayal of the residents of Paradise as well as the cinematography and score, though some critics found its narrative confusing.

== Summary ==
Rebuilding Paradise begins by chronicling the 2018 Camp Fire, part of the 2018 California wildfires, which occurred in Paradise on November 8, 2018, through videos recorded by locals and a policeman. Prior, warnings of a potential fire exacerbated by strong winds had been declared. As predicted, the fire spread rapidly, destroying objects in a short period of time. Mandatory evacuation was soon declared. Residents are warned to evacuate on foot, though most violated and continued driving; many made their way out, while others died of suffocation.

"There [was] a gentleman who [...] said [to me], 'My family is trying to get out of [Paradise] going down Circle Drive.' And I was like, 'They need to not go that way.' But there was no cell service. In the [next] morning, I went down there, and turn up did find that the [car] had burned, and [...] didn't find anything. But a little bit later, I saw a lady [talking] about going down Circle Drive and her vehicle [burned], and her son being there and getting him out of there. She had burns in her arms, [starts tearing up] and I know it was her, so... [silence] I [...] gave her a hug because I've been looking for her body. [silence] Sorry. [leaves the scene, camera stays still]

— Police officer Matt Gates

The residents of Paradise then describe their close connection to the town. Former mayor Woody Culleton recalls being an alcoholic living in the caravan of a backyard in 1981; he sobered up three years later, became an official in 2004, and subsequently became mayor. Meanwhile, many survivors were assisted by disaster recovery centers, though certain residents doubts Paradise will be rebuilt. A memorial was later held honoring the dead.

A month after the fire, the process of rebuilding was announced by the head of the Paradise Police. People later began living in the territory in trailers, they also reunite at a small party held by Paradise police officer Matt Gates. Three months later, however, the Federal Emergency Management Agency (FEMA) states that, due to the discovery of various lethal chemicals like benzene, debris must be removed before any property can be placed; this is met with reluctance-filled resident-government clashes. This slowly found a solution, and Culleton becomes the first person permitted to rebuild his house. While more houses were starting to be built, FEMA also made temporary houses. The Paradise High School also reopens by celebrating delayed graduates. On June 11, 2019, community leader Philip Allan John died from cardiac arrest; his wife, Michelle John, says that this and the Camp Fire stresses the need to prioritize health first. A resident says that the younger generations may not see a better future retaining in Paradise, as it was before the fire. However the film later shines more hope on a better future of the community, through the perseverance of its residents.

Meanwhile, the film reflects: while strong winds and the area's history of logging were factors in the fire, the Pacific Gas and Electric Company (PG&E) was the main one. After the forecast predicting strong winds and elevated wildfire risk, the company claimed that it had cut the power to its transmission lines, but it became clear that it had not, as hardware on a poorly maintained line in the Feather River Canyon failed, igniting sparks and starting the fire. This revelation led to an outcry among residents, who called the company ignorant; Culleton sent a letter featuring photos of the aftermath. Paradise attorney Joe Early and environmental activist Erin Brockovich filed a lawsuit; the former said the company never cared about the environment during his experience working with them, and the latter said the company is responsible for much more incidents. The California Department of Forestry and Fire Protection (Cal Fire) deemed PG&E responsible. Nine months after the fire, prescribed burning was done towards the young trees in an effort to prevent future similar fires.

== Production ==
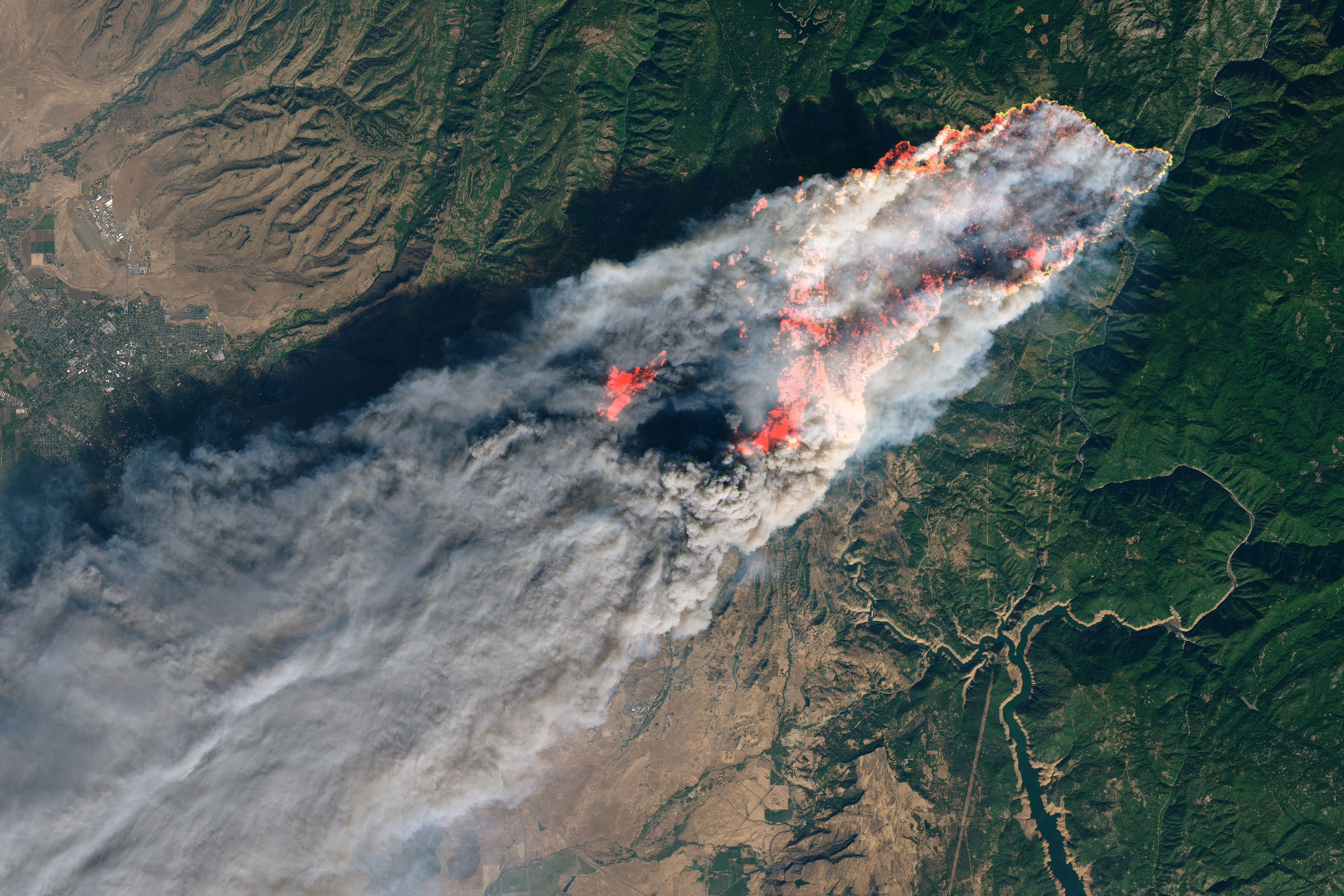
The Camp Fire as seen from satellite

In January 2019, it was announced Ron Howard would direct the film and serve as a producer under his Imagine Entertainment banner, with National Geographic Documentary Films distributing.

== Release ==
Rebuilding Paradise had its world premiere on January 24, 2020, at the Sundance Film Festival. An April 15 screening was also expected at the Tribeca Film Festival, but restrictions due to the COVID-19 pandemic cancelled the festival. It was also an official selection at the 2020 AFI Docs. At its July screening at the Edinburgh International Film Festival, every US$1 from the tickets sold goes to charities supporting Paradise.

The film later premiered theatrically in the United States on July 31, 2020. Due to COVID-19 restrictions that closed various theaters, Howard allowed for any medium of distribution possible. Eventually, over 70 virtual cinemas, "carefully selected" traditional theaters, and drive-in theaters played it. National Geographic and Imagine Entertainment then took to distributor Abramorama, who distributed Howard's previous work, The Beatles: Eight Days A Week (2016). Rebuilding Paradise later saw a virtual cinema premiere on July 12, which amassed over 6,000 viewers, including first responders; the film's team said they were heartened by the news.

== Critical reception ==
Rebuilding Paradise holds a 93% approval rating on review aggregator website Rotten Tomatoes, based on 68 reviews, with an average of 7.5/10. The consensus reads, "From the horror of natural disaster to the spirit summoned behind the titular effort, Rebuilding Paradise stirringly depicts one community's perseverance."
