= Chris Smith (2010s defensive back) =

American football player (born 1987)

No. 5, 23, 3, 2
- Position: Defensive back

Personal information
- Born: June 23, 1987 (age 39); Bradenton, Florida, U.S.
- Listed height: 5 ft 10 in (1.78 m)
- Listed weight: 195 lb (88 kg)

Career information
- High school: Palmetto (Palmetto, Florida)
- College: Northern Illinois
- NFL draft: 2011: undrafted

Career history
- St. Louis Rams (2011); Omaha Nighthawks (2012); Tampa Bay Storm (2012–2014); Montreal Alouettes (2014–2015); Jacksonville Sharks (2015–2016); Columbus Lions (2016–2017); Atlanta Havoc (2018); Jacksonville Sharks (2018)

Awards and highlights
- AIF champion (2016); First-team All-MAC (2010)

Career NFL statistics
- Total tackles: 3
- Stats at Pro Football Reference

Career CFL statistics
- Total tackles: 13
- Stats at CFL.ca (archived)

Career AFL statistics
- Total tackles: 123.5
- Interceptions: 16
- Forced fumbles: 2
- Total touchdowns: 1
- Stats at ArenaFan.com

Chris Smith (born June 23, 1987) is an American former professional football player who was a defensive back in the National Football League (NFL), Canadian Football League (CFL), and Arena Football League (AFL). Smith was a member of the St. Louis Rams, Omaha Nighthawks, Tampa Bay Storm, Montreal Alouettes, Jacksonville Sharks, Columbus Lions, and Atlanta Havoc. He played college football for the Northern Illinois Huskies.

== Amateur career ==
Smith attended Palmetto High School in Palmetto, Florida.

Smith recorded 41 tackles, six interceptions, 15 pass break-ups, forced two fumbles and blocked a kick for the Highland Scotties of Highland Community College in 2008. He was a second-team All-Kansas Jayhawk Community College Conference selection.

He enrolled at Northern Illinois University in January 2009. Smith played in 26 games for the Huskies from 2009 to 2010, starting 25. He earned first-team All Mid-American Conference honors after recording 50 solo tackles, three interceptions and 15 knockdowns his senior season.

== Professional career ==
Pre-draft measurables
Height	Weight	40-yard dash	10-yard split	20-yard split	20-yard shuttle	Three-cone drill	Vertical jump	Broad jump	Bench press
5 ft 9 3/4 in (1.77 m)	186 lb (84 kg)	4.73 s	1.67 s	2.68 s	4.26 s	7.46 s	31.0 in (0.79 m)	9 ft 10 in (3.00 m)	9 reps
All values from Pro Day

Smith was signed by the St. Louis Rams of the National Football League (NFL) on July 27, 2011 after going undrafted in the 2011 NFL draft. He was released by the Rams on August 8, 2011. He was signed by the Rams on November 16, 2011. Smith appeared in three games for the Rams in 2011, recording three tackles. He was released by the Rams on April 30, 2012.

Smith was selected by the Omaha Nighthawks of the United Football League (UFL) with the 17th pick in the 2011 UFL draft. He spent the 2012 season with the Nighthawks.

Smith signed with the Tampa Bay Storm of the Arena Football League (AFL) on November 5, 2012. He was played on Other League Exempt on May 12, 2014.

Smith was signed by the Montreal Alouettes of the Canadian Football League on May 16, 2014. He was released by the Alouettes on May 31, 2015.

On June 9, 2015, Smith was assigned to the Jacksonville Sharks of the AFL. He recorded 26 tackles, two interceptions and six pass breakups in seven games for the Sharks during the 2015 season. On April 9, 2016, Smith was placed on recallable reassignment.

Smith spent time with the Columbus Lions of American Indoor Football in 2016. In January 2017, Smith re-signed with the Lions, who had moved to the National Arena League.

In September 2017, Smith signed with the Atlanta Havoc of the American Arena League for the 2018 season.
