= Damian Copeland =

American football player (born 1990)

No. 83
- Position: Wide receiver

Personal information
- Born: October 17, 1990 (age 36); Bradenton, Florida, U.S.
- Listed height: 6 ft 1 in (1.85 m)
- Listed weight: 182 lb (83 kg)

Career information
- High school: Palmetto (FL)
- College: University of Louisville
- NFL draft: 2014: undrafted

Career history
- Jacksonville Jaguars (2014–2015); Detroit Lions (2016)
- Stats at Pro Football Reference

Damian Copeland (born October 17, 1990) is an American former football wide receiver. He played college football at the University of Louisville and was signed by the Jacksonville Jaguars as an undrafted free agent in 2014.

== Early life ==
Copeland attended Palmetto High School in Palmetto, Florida. During his senior year, he caught 52 passes for 718 yards and 11 TDs. He received All-Area honors and was an All-State selection.

He was considered a two-star recruit by Rivals.com.

== College career ==
Copeland attended the University of Louisville. During his career he played in 34 games and had 116 receptions for 1521 yards and 7 touchdowns.

== Professional career ==
=== Predraft ===
Pre-draft measurables
| Height | Weight | 40-yard dash | 10-yard split | 20-yard split | 20-yard shuttle | Three-cone drill | Vertical jump | Broad jump | Bench press |
|---|---|---|---|---|---|---|---|---|---|
| 5 ft 11 in (1.80 m) | 184 lb (83 kg) | 4.50 s | 1.54 s | 2.60 s | 4.12 s | 6.88 s | 40 in (1.02 m) | 10 ft 00 in (3.05 m) | 12 reps |
All values from NFL Combine and Pro Day

=== Jacksonville Jaguars ===
Copeland was signed by the Jacksonville Jaguars on July 18, 2014, after going undrafted in the 2014 NFL draft. He suffered a wrist injury and was placed on injured reserve on August 4, 2014.

On August 24, 2015, Copeland was waived/injured by the Jaguars. After going unclaimed, he was placed on injured reserve.

=== Detroit Lions ===
On June 7, 2016, Copeland signed to the Detroit Lions.
