= Joel Bell =

American gridiron football player (born 1985)

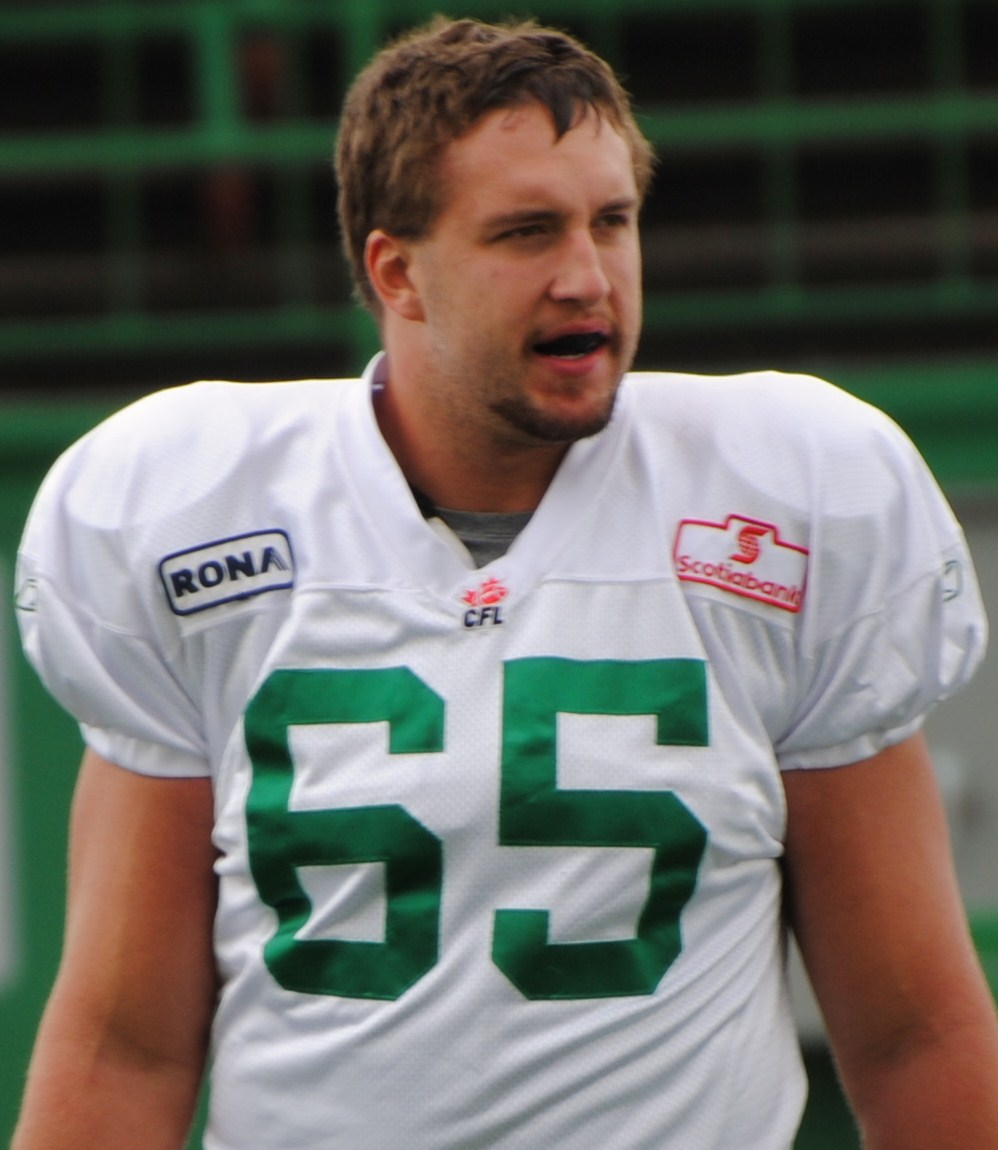
- Bell with the Saskatchewan Roughriders in 2010

No. 65, 68, 73
- Position: Offensive tackle

Personal information
- Born: July 29, 1985 (age 41); Cleveland, Ohio, U.S.
- Listed height: 6 ft 7 in (2.01 m)
- Listed weight: 315 lb (143 kg)

Career information
- College: Furman
- NFL draft: 2009: undrafted

Career history
- 2009: Buffalo Bills*
- 2009–2010: Saskatchewan Roughriders
- 2011: Las Vegas Locomotives
- 2012: Edmonton Eskimos
- * Offseason or practice squad member only

Awards and highlights
- All-American FCS, Associated Press, Land Sports Network (2008); Jacobs Blocking Trophy (2008); College Sporting News FCS Fabulous 50 Team (2008); 2× First-team All-SoCon (2007, 2008); South Carolina All-State College Football Team (2007); Second-team All-SoCon (2006); SoCon Freshman of the Week vs. Hofstra (2005)

Joel Bell (born July 29, 1985) is an American former football offensive lineman. He signed with the Buffalo Bills in 2009.

In 2004 Bell accepted an athletic scholarship to attend Furman University in Greenville, SC. From 2006 to 2008 as left tackle, he captured All-Conference honors each year as well as All-American honors and the Jacobs Blocking Trophy his senior year. Bell was also named to the 2007 South Carolina All-State Football Team and the 2008 College Sporting News FCS Fabulous 50 Team. In 2009 Bell played in the Texas vs. the Nation All-Star Classic and was invited to the 2009 NFL Scouting Combine. After a short stint with the Buffalo Bills in 2009 where chronic injuries lead to Bell's release, he helped lead the Saskatchewan Roughriders of the Canadian Football League to two back-to-back Grey Cup appearances. In the 2011 UFL draft, Bell was chosen fifth overall by the Las Vegas Locomotives and helped the team to the championship game that year. After suffering what would be a career ending injury, Bell spent the 2012 season on injury reserve with the Edmonton Eskimos. Since finishing his football career, he has completed two master's degrees from The Southern Baptist Theological Seminary, and begun a doctorate from Christ Church, University of Oxford in Hebrew and Jewish Studies.
