= Palmetto High School (Florida) =

High school in Palmetto, Florida, United States

Location
- 1200 17th Street West; Palmetto, Florida 34221; United States; 27°31′47″N 82°34′38″W

Information
- Type: Comprehensive public high school
- Established: 1930; 96 years ago
- School district: Manatee County School District
- CEEB code: 101352
- NCES School ID: 120123001232
- Principal: Monica DeLesline
- Teaching staff: 92.00 (on an FTE basis)
- Grades: 9–12
- Enrollment: 2,194 (2023-2024)
- Student to teacher ratio: 23.85
- Colors: Red, white, black
- Mascot: Tigers
- Newspaper: The Prowl
- Website: www.manateeschools.net/o/palmetto

Palmetto High School, a high school located in Palmetto, Florida was originally opened in 1957 and rebuilt in 1999. The school's athletic teams are known as the Tigers, and the school colors are red, white, and black. The school currently serves students in grades 9 through 12.

== Campus layout ==
The campus is made up of about 70 buildings. The cafeteria, office, library and old auditorium are located near the front of the school and the art room, gym, new auditorium, and JROTC building are in the back of the school.

== Notable alumni ==
- Damian Copeland, former NFL wide receiver for the Jacksonville Jaguars and Detroit Lions
- Ralph Haben, former Speaker of the Florida House of Representatives.
- Joe Hills, AFL wide receiver for the Tampa Bay Storm.
- Dallas Jackson, NAL defensive back for the Jacksonville Sharks.
- Mistral Raymond, former NFL defensive back for the Minnesota Vikings and former captain at the University of South Florida.
- Chris Smith, NFL, AFL and CFL player.
- LaJohntay Wester, American football wide receiver/kick returner for the Baltimore Ravens
- Raymond Woodie Jr., football coach
