= Jeff Maehl =

American football player (born 1989)

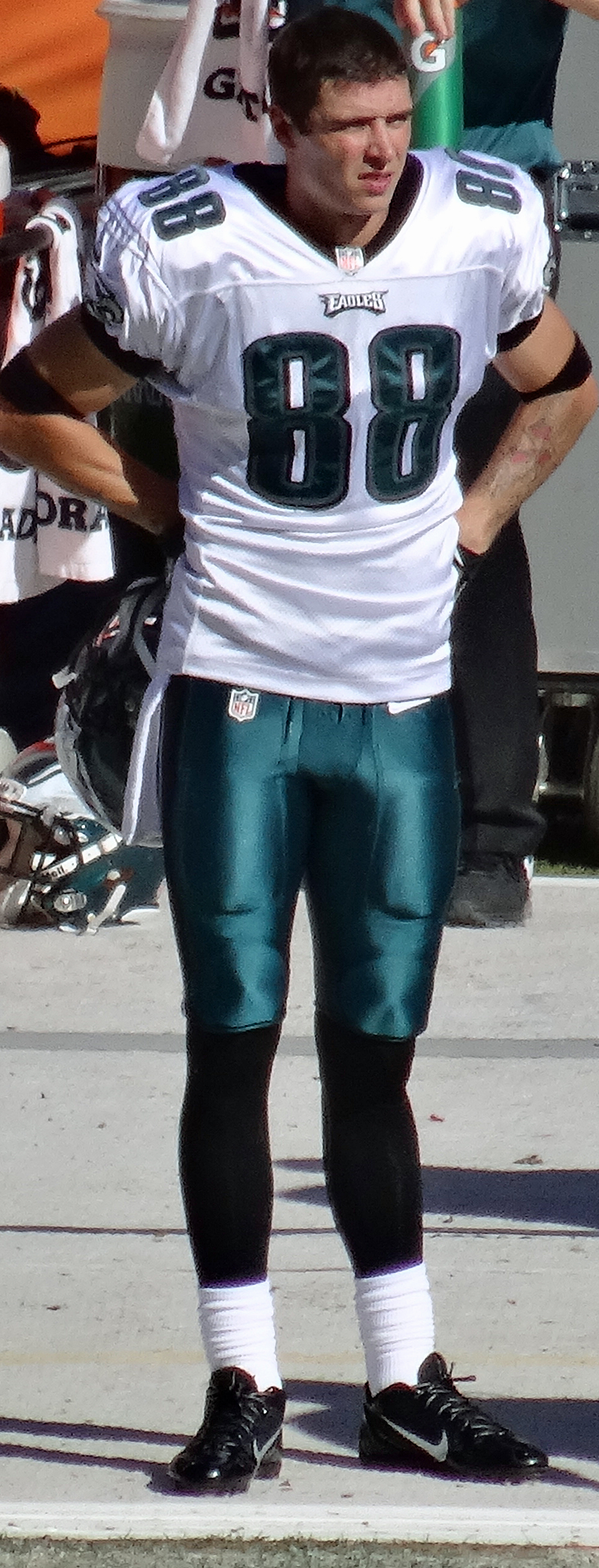
- Maehl with the Eagles in 2013

No. 15, 88
- Position: Wide receiver

Personal information
- Born: March 16, 1989 (age 37); Paradise, California, U.S.
- Listed height: 6 ft 0 in (1.83 m)
- Listed weight: 184 lb (83 kg)

Career information
- High school: Paradise
- College: Oregon
- NFL draft: 2011: undrafted

Career history
- Houston Texans (2011–2012); Philadelphia Eagles (2013–2014)

Awards and highlights
- First-team All-Pac-10 (2010)

Career NFL statistics
- Receptions: 9
- Receiving yards: 113
- Receiving touchdowns: 1
- Stats at Pro Football Reference

Jeffrey David Maehl (born March 16, 1989) is an American former professional football player who was a wide receiver in the National Football League (NFL). He played college football for the Oregon Ducks and was signed by the Houston Texans as an undrafted free agent in 2011. He also played for the Philadelphia Eagles.

== Early life ==
Maehl played for the Paradise High School Bobcats in Paradise, California, where he wore the #15 jersey. He played in the 2007 Lions Club District 4C-1 All-Star Game along with former rival at Pleasant Valley High School quarterback Jordan Rodgers.

== College career ==
Maehl played college football with the University of Oregon Ducks. As a senior in 2010, Maehl caught 77 passes for 1,076 yards while helping Oregon to the 2011 BCS National Championship Game. In that game, quarterback Darron Thomas and Maehl combined to set the record for the longest pass play from scrimmage in a championship game: 81 yards. Prior to the 2011 NFL draft, Maehl was predicted to be a late-round draft pick by draft analyst Mel Kiper Jr.

== Professional career ==
=== Pre-draft ===
Pre-draft measurables
Height	Weight	Arm length	Hand span	40-yard dash	10-yard split	20-yard split	20-yard shuttle	Three-cone drill	Vertical jump	Broad jump
6 ft 0 7/8 in (1.85 m)	190 lb (86 kg)	31 1/2 in (0.80 m)	9 1/8 in (0.23 m)	4.69 s	1.60 s	2.69 s	3.94 s	6.42 s	33.5 in (0.85 m)	9 ft 7 in (2.92 m)
All values from NFL Combine

At the NFL Combine, Maehl had a strong performance. He measured in at 6'1" and 190 lbs and had a slower than average 40-time of 4.62 seconds. However, in the measures of quickness – 20-yard shuttle, 60-yard shuttle, and 3-cone drill – Maehl finished 2nd, 1st, and 1st respectively. Maehl's 6.42 second 3-cone drill was not only the fastest in this year's draft, but the fastest it has been run in six years. He still holds the current record as of the end of 2021 Combine.

=== Houston Texans ===
Maehl went undrafted in the 2011 NFL Draft, but he was selected with the final pick of the 2011 UFL draft by the Virginia Destroyers.

Maehl was signed by the Houston Texans as an undrafted free agent on July 25, 2011. Despite being waived by Houston on September 3, 2011, Maehl was signed to the Texans practice squad on September 4, 2011. On December 13, 2011, Maehl was signed to the active roster following the release of fellow wide receiver Derrick Mason. Maehl was cut on September 1, 2012, while the Texans were trimming their roster to 53 men, signed by Texans to the practice squad on September 4, 2011, signed from practice squad to active roster by Texans on December 13, 2011, and signed by the Texans to Reserve/Future contracts on January 24, 2013.

=== Philadelphia Eagles ===
Maehl was traded to the Philadelphia Eagles for offensive tackle Nate Menkin on August 12, 2013, where he was reunited with his former college coach Chip Kelly. In week four of the 2013 season Maehl came in during a blowout loss to the Denver Broncos in the fourth quarter and caught a touchdown. In the 2014 season, he appeared in eight games.

== Personal life ==
Maehl lives in Portland, Oregon. He has one tattoo on his right arm that says "Paradise California", his hometown, and features a row of pine trees, and more scripture and design. There is a tattoo on his left arm in honor of drowned former teammate Todd Doxey, who died in 2008. Doxey was a close friend and roommate of Maehl.
