= Paradise Skypark =

- IATA: PYS; ICAO: none; FAA LID: CA92

Summary
- Airport type: Private
- Owner: John H. Franklin+
- Serves: Paradise, California
- Elevation AMSL: 1,300 ft / 396 m
- Coordinates: 39°42′38″N 121°36′59″W
- Website: paradiseairport.com

Map
- Location of Paradise Skypark in California

Runways
Direction	Length		Surface
Direction	ft	m	Surface
17/35	3,017	920	Asphalt

Statistics (2005)
- Aircraft operations: 14,900
- Based aircraft: 45
- Source: Federal Aviation Administration

Paradise Skypark (IATA: PYS, FAA LID: CA92, formerly L24) is a private use airport located three nautical miles (6 km) south of the central business district of Paradise, in Butte County, California, United States.

It was previously a public use airport with the FAA identifier L24 (formerly P40).

== Facilities and aircraft ==
The airport covers an area of 35 acres (14 ha) at an elevation of 1,300 feet (396 m) above mean sea level. It has one runway designated 17/35 with an asphalt surface measuring 3,017 by 60 feet (920 x 18 m).

For the 12-month period ending December 31, 2005, the airport had 14,900 aircraft operations, an average of 40 per day: 97% general aviation and 3% air taxi. At that time there were 45 aircraft based at this airport: 98% single-engine, and 2% multi-engine.
