= Paradise Unified School District =

School district in California, United States

Location
- 6696 Clark Rd. Paradise, California 95969 United States

District information
- Grades: K–12
- Schools: 3 elementary (K–5), 2 smaller learning communities (6), 1 middle (6–8), 1 K–8, 3 high (9–12), 1 academy (7–12)

Other information
- Website: www.pusdk12.org

Paradise Unified School District is a public school district in Butte County, California, United States.

The district includes Paradise, Butte Meadows, Stirling City, almost all of Magalia, and a small piece of Butte Creek Canyon.

== Schools ==
The District includes:

- Pine Ridge School
- Cedarwood Elementary School
- Paradise Ridge Elementary School
- Paradise Junior High School
- Paradise High School
- Ridgeview High School
- Paradise eLearning Academy
