= 2011 UFL draft =

The 2011 UFL draft was the third and final draft of the United Football League. The draft took place on Monday, May 2, 2011. The draft was held over a period of 10 rounds during which each of the five UFL teams was allowed one pick per round, in reverse order of 2010 finish, with the last-place Hartford Colonials picking first and the champion Las Vegas Locomotives picking last in each round. The expansion Virginia Destroyers took the place of the defunct Florida Tuskers, from whom the Destroyers inherited their staff, in the draft order; the Destroyers also received a "bonus selection" at both the end of the fourth round and the end of the draft, respectively. During rounds one and two, each team had five minutes to make their selection of a player. During rounds three through ten, each team had three minutes to make their selection of a player. The round by round results were announced via the Twitter feeds of each individual coach, as well as through commissioner Michael Huyghue's Twitter feed.

The UFL moved its draft up to May 2, two days after the end of the 2011 NFL draft, in part to accommodate the UFL's proposed earlier start in August (since abandoned) for the 2011 season, and also to take advantage of the lockout in the National Football League. Players who went undrafted in the 2011 NFL Draft could not sign with NFL teams because of the lockout. As a result, the UFL made efforts to draft and sign those players before the lockout was lifted. Pat Devlin, the former Delaware quarterback and one of the higher rated undrafted prospects, was given an offer to be the first overall draft pick, but because the Hartford Colonials also requested he sign a UFL contract as a condition of being picked, Devlin declined. As in previous UFL drafts, players with professional experience were also eligible to be drafted. Overall, 24 undrafted rookies and 28 professional veterans were selected in the draft.

First overall draft pick Jerrod Johnson defected from the UFL to the Philadelphia Eagles in late July 2011, amid rumors that the Colonials were to be contracted. He returned to the UFL for the 2012 season, this time with the Sacramento Mountain Lions.

Players selected in the draft remain on each team's reserve/unsigned list until the player signs the league's standard form contract and is added to the roster.

== Trades ==
- The Las Vegas Locomotives traded their fourth-round draft pick to the Hartford Colonials and their tenth-round pick to the Omaha Nighthawks.
- The Sacramento Mountain Lions traded their eighth-round draft pick to the Omaha Nighthawks.

== Draft results ==
=== Round one ===
Pick	Overall	Team	Position	Name	School
1	1	Hartford	QB	Jerrod Johnson**	Texas A&M
2	2	Omaha	CB	Reynaldo Hill*	Florida
3	3	Sacramento	QB	Ryan Colburn*	Fresno State
4	4	Virginia	DE	Martail Burnett*	Utah
5	5	Las Vegas	OT	Joel Bell*	Furman

=== Round two ===
Pick	Overall	Team	Position	Name	School
1	6	Hartford	OG	Kurt Quarterman*	Louisville
2	7	Omaha	DE	Jamie Cumbie*	Clemson
3	8	Sacramento	DE	Ugo Chinasa	Oklahoma State
4	9	Virginia	DT	Ryan Sims**	North Carolina
5	10	Las Vegas	DE	Lawrence Wilson*	Connecticut

=== Round three ===
Pick	Overall	Team	Position	Name	School
1	11	Hartford	C	Cecil Newton**	Tennessee State
2	12	Omaha	OT	Joe Toledo*	Washington
3	13	Sacramento	CB	Derrick Roberson	Rutgers
4	14	Virginia	RB	Adrian N. Peterson*	Georgia Southern
5	15	Las Vegas	WR	Eric Peterman*	Northwestern

=== Round four ===
Pick	Overall	Team	Position	Name	School
1	16	Hartford	OG	Ricky Henry	Nebraska
2	17	Omaha	CB	Chris Smith*	Northern Illinois
3	18	Sacramento	DE	Roberto Davis*	NW Missouri State
4	19	Virginia	WR	Aundrae Allison*	East Carolina
5	20	Hartford	OL	Brad Thorson	Kansas
B	21	Virginia	LB	Clint Ingram**	Oklahoma

=== Round five ===
Pick	Overall	Team	Position	Name	School
1	22	Hartford	RB	Philip Tanner*	Middle Tennessee State
2	23	Omaha	OT	Mike Smith	Nebraska
3	24	Sacramento	LB	Spencer Paysinger	Oregon
4	25	Virginia	DT	Trevor Anderson*	Albany
5	26	Las Vegas	FB	Kennedy Tinsley* (later released)	North Carolina

=== Round six ===
Pick	Overall	Team	Position	Name	School
1	27	Hartford	DE	Ervin Baldwin*	Michigan State
2	28	Omaha	OT	D. J. Jones*	Nebraska
3	29	Sacramento	WR	Jamel Hamler	Fresno State
4	30	Virginia	DT	Ian Scott	Florida
5	31	Las Vegas	QB	Mike Teel	Rutgers

=== Round seven ===
Pick	Overall	Team	Position	Name	School
1	32	Hartford	TE	Greg Smith	Texas
2	33	Omaha	TE	Kyle Nelson	New Mexico State
3	34	Sacramento	OT	Kainoa LaCount*	Hawaii
4	35	Virginia	TE	Joe Monteverde*	Richmond
5	36	Las Vegas	LB	Dave Philistin*	Maryland

=== Round eight ===
Pick	Overall	Team	Position	Name	School
1	37	Hartford	DT	Colby Whitlock	Texas Tech
2	38	Omaha	QB	Jeremiah Masoli*	Mississippi
3	39	Omaha	DE	Brian Johnston	Gardner–Webb
4	40	Virginia	RB	Wynel Seldon*	Wyoming
5	41	Las Vegas	WR	Cameron Colvin*	Oregon

=== Round nine ===
Pick	Overall	Team	Position	Name	School
1	42	Hartford	DT	Jonathan Lewis*	Virginia Tech
2	43	Omaha	RB	Derrick Locke	Kentucky
3	44	Sacramento	CB	Josh Gatlin*	North Dakota State
4	45	Virginia	QB	Derek Devine*	Marshall
5	46	Las Vegas	RB	Mario Fannin	Auburn

=== Round ten ===
Pick	Overall	Team	Position	Name	School
1	47	Hartford	DE	Keith Grennan*	Eastern Washington
2	48	Omaha	DT	Akiem Hicks	University of Regina
3	49	Sacramento	S	Keanemana Silva	Hawaii
4	50	Virginia	DB	Jahi Word-Daniels*	Georgia Tech
5	51	Omaha	LB	Mark Herzlich	Boston College
B	52	Virginia	WR	Jeff Maehl	Oregon

=== Notes ===
(* indicates signed for 2011 season) (** indicates signed, but defected to the NFL)
