= Cecil Newton =

American football player (born 1986)

Cecil Newton Jr.
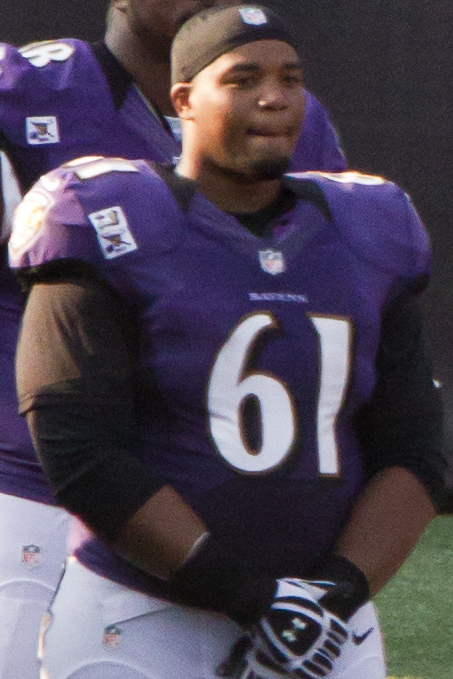
- Newton with the Ravens in August 2012

No. 76, 64, 60, 61
- Position: Center

Personal information
- Born: March 20, 1986 (age 40); Savannah, Georgia, U.S.
- Listed height: 6 ft 2 in (1.88 m)
- Listed weight: 303 lb (137 kg)

Career information
- College: Tennessee State
- NFL draft: 2009: undrafted

Career history
- Jacksonville Jaguars (2009–2010); Hartford Colonials (2011)*; New Orleans Saints (2011)*; Green Bay Packers (2011)*; Baltimore Ravens (2011–2012)*
- * Offseason or practice squad member only

Awards and highlights
- First-team All-OVC (2006)
- Stats at Pro Football Reference

Cecil Newton Jr. (born March 20, 1986) is an American former football center. He was signed by the Jacksonville Jaguars as an undrafted free agent in 2009. He played college football at Tennessee State. He is the son of Cecil Newton Sr. and older brother of Cam Newton.

He was also a member of the Hartford Colonials, New Orleans Saints, Green Bay Packers and Baltimore Ravens.

== Professional career ==
Pre-draft measurables
Height	Weight	40-yard dash	10-yard split	20-yard split	20-yard shuttle	Three-cone drill	Vertical jump	Broad jump	Bench press
6 ft 1 5/8 in (1.87 m)	300 lb (136 kg)	5.13 s	1.73 s	2.91 s	4.15 s	7.55 s	25.5 in (0.65 m)	8 ft 2 in (2.49 m)	25 reps
All values from Pro Day

=== Jacksonville Jaguars ===
After going undrafted in the 2009 NFL draft, Newton was signed by the Jacksonville Jaguars as an undrafted free agent on April 26. He was waived during final cuts on September 5 and re-signed to the team's practice squad the following day. The Jaguars promoted Newton to the active roster on December 21.

=== Hartford Colonials ===
Newton was drafted by the Hartford Colonials with the 11th overall pick in the 2011 UFL draft. After the Colonials' suspension of operations for the 2011 season, Newton's rights were acquired by the Omaha Nighthawks in a dispersal draft.

=== New Orleans Saints ===
On August 1, 2011, Newton signed with the New Orleans Saints, but was waived on September 3 and re-signed to the practice squad the next day. However, he was released from the practice squad on September 5.

=== Green Bay Packers ===
On October 13, 2011, Newton was signed to the Green Bay Packers' practice squad following injuries to starters Chad Clifton and Bryan Bulaga. He was released on October 23.

=== Baltimore Ravens ===
On November 28, 2011, Newton was signed to the Baltimore Ravens' practice squad.

== Personal life ==
His father, Cecil Newton Sr., played college football, as a safety and linebacker, for Savannah State, and was cut from the pre-season rosters of the 1983 Dallas Cowboys and 1984 Buffalo Bills, as a safety on both teams.

His brother Cam Newton won the 2010 Heisman Trophy while playing quarterback for Auburn University, and won the 2010 National Championship during his tenure there. He was the first pick in the 2011 NFL draft by the Carolina Panthers.
