= Dallas Jackson (American football) =

American football player (born 1983)

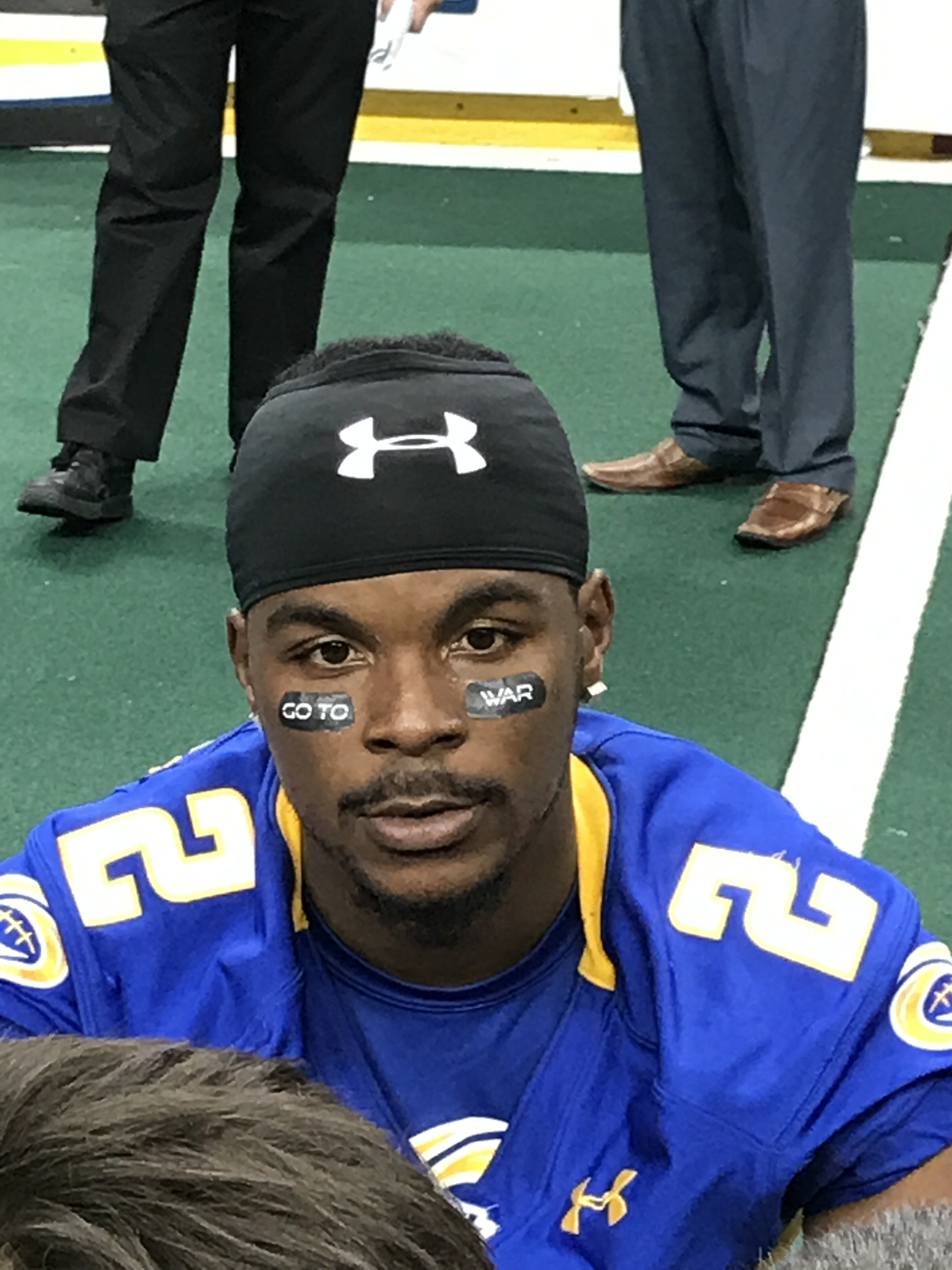
- Jackson with the Tampa Bay Storm in 2017

No. 2, 13, 6
- Position: Defensive back

Personal information
- Born: November 20, 1993 (age 32); Bradenton, Florida, U.S.
- Listed height: 5 ft 10 in (1.78 m)
- Listed weight: 190 lb (86 kg)

Career information
- High school: Palmetto (FL)
- College: Jacksonville
- NFL draft: 2016: undrafted

Career history
- Tampa Bay Storm (2016–2017); Florida Tarpons (2018); Washington Valor (2018)*; Jacksonville Sharks (2018–?)
- * Offseason or practice squad member only

Awards and highlights
- 2× Honorable Mention All-PFL (2014, 2015)

Career AFL statistics
- Tackles: 11.5
- Pass breakups: 1
- Stats at ArenaFan.com

Dallas Jackson (born November 20, 1993) is an American former football defensive back. He played college football at Jacksonville University and attended Palmetto High School in Palmetto, Florida. He was a member of the Tampa Bay Storm, Florida Tarpons, Washington Valor, and Jacksonville Sharks.

== Early life ==
Jackson attended Palmetto High School where he played American football, basketball and track and field.

== College career ==
Jackson played for the Jacksonville Dolphins from 2012 to 2015. He was the team's starter his final two years and helped the Dolphins to 30 wins. He played in 41 games during his career including 24 starts at safety.

== Professional career ==
Pre-draft measurables
| Height | Weight | 40-yard dash | 10-yard split | 20-yard split | 20-yard shuttle | Three-cone drill | Vertical jump | Broad jump | Bench press |
|---|---|---|---|---|---|---|---|---|---|
| 5 ft 9 in (1.75 m) | 187 lb (85 kg) | 4.56 s | 1.60 s | 2.70 s | 4.33 s | 6.79 s | 37.5 in (0.95 m) | 10 ft 1 in (3.07 m) | 13 reps |
All values from Jacksonville Pro Day

Jackson was assigned to the Tampa Bay Storm on August 5, 2016, but did not appear in a game. On January 5, 2017, the Storm exercised their rookie option on Jackson. Jackson made his debut on April 15, 2017 against the Philadelphia Soul. On June 2, 2017, Jackson was placed on reassignment. On June 29, 2017, Jackson was assigned to the Storm. The Storm folded in December 2017.

Jackson signed with the Florida Tarpons of the American Arena League on January 20, 2018.

On March 23, 2018, he was assigned to the Washington Valor. On April 10, 2018, he was placed on reassignment.

On April 19, 2018, Jackson signed with the Jacksonville Sharks.
