= Dallas Jackson (ice hockey) =

Canadian ice hockey player

- Born: March 31, 1989 (age 37) Edson, Alberta, Canada
- Height: 6 ft 2 in (188 cm)
- Weight: 187 lb (85 kg; 13 st 5 lb)
- Position: Defence
- Shot: Left
- Played for: Bridgeport Sound Tigers; Lake Erie Monsters; Springfield Falcons; Hartford Wolf Pack; Hudiksvalls HC
- NHL draft: Undrafted
- Playing career: 2010–2016

Dallas Jackson (born March 31, 1989) is a Canadian former professional ice hockey defenceman. He last played with Hudiksvalls HC of the Hockeyettan (Div.1).

== Playing career ==
Jackson played major junior hockey in the Western Hockey League. On September 2, 2010, the Reading Royals of the ECHL signed Jackson to his first professional contract.

Jackson returned for his third season with the Gwinnett Gladiators of the ECHL to start the 2012–13 season. On December 29, 2012, he was signed to a try-out contract for a second stint with the Bridgeport Sound Tigers. After 11 games in Bridgeport, Jackson was extended and signed to his first AHL contract with the Sound Tigers for the remainder of the season on February 27, 2013.

In the 2013–14 season, Jackson posted 24 points in 53 games as a regular on the Sound Tigers defense before he was traded to the Springfield Falcons in exchange for Jeremy Langlois on March 12, 2014.

On September 11, 2014, the Greenville Road Warriors announced that they had signed Jackson to a one-year contract. In the 2014–15 season, Jackson appeared in 23 games with the Road Warriors before he was loaned to AHL affiliate, the Hartford Wolf Pack. Jackson was able to establish a role on the blueline with the Wolf Pack and was signed for the remainder of the season to feature in 44 games for 10 points.

As an un-signed free agent over the summer, Jackson signed his first contract abroad, agreeing a one-year deal in Sweden with Hockeyettan club, Hudiksvalls HC on August 4, 2015.

== Career statistics ==
			Regular season					Playoffs
Season	Team	League	GP	G	A	Pts	PIM	GP	G	A	Pts	PIM
2006–07	Olds Grizzlys	AJHL	1	1	0	1	0	—	—	—	—	—
2007–08	Red Deer Rebels	WHL	41	4	9	13	26	—	—	—	—	—
2007–08	Regina Pats	WHL	18	1	5	6	15	3	0	0	0	2
2008–09	Prince George Cougars	WHL	67	13	25	38	93	4	0	2	2	18
2009–10	Prince George Cougars	WHL	29	11	18	29	27	—	—	—	—	—
2009–10	Kelowna Rockets	WHL	19	3	13	16	12	12	0	6	6	14
2010–11	Reading Royals	ECHL	30	2	7	9	8	—	—	—	—	—
2010–11	Gwinnett Gladiators	ECHL	9	0	0	0	8	—	—	—	—	—
2011–12	Gwinnett Gladiators	ECHL	62	7	22	29	85	3	1	3	4	2
2011–12	Bridgeport Sound Tigers	AHL	3	0	0	0	0	—	—	—	—	—
2011–12	Lake Erie Monsters	AHL	2	0	1	1	0	—	—	—	—	—
2012–13	Gwinnett Gladiators	ECHL	31	7	8	15	34	8	1	1	2	2
2012–13	Bridgeport Sound Tigers	AHL	21	0	3	3	10	—	—	—	—	—
2013–14	Bridgeport Sound Tigers	AHL	53	3	21	24	36	—	—	—	—	—
2013–14	Springfield Falcons	AHL	4	0	1	1	2	—	—	—	—	—
2014–15	Greenville Road Warriors	ECHL	23	5	9	14	14	—	—	—	—	—
2014–15	Hartford Wolf Pack	AHL	44	1	9	10	18	—	—	—	—	—
2015–16	Hudiksvalls HC	Div.1	20	2	12	14	30	—	—	—	—	—
AHL totals			127	4	35	39	66	—	—	—	—	—
