= Paradise High School =

Location
- 5911 Maxwell Drive; Paradise, California 95969; United States
- Coordinates: 39°45′41″N 121°36′49″W

Information
- Other name: PHS
- Type: Public high school
- School district: Paradise Unified School District
- NCES School ID: 062982004640
- Teaching staff: 26.11 (on an FTE basis)
- Grades: 9–12
- Enrollment: 506 (2023-2024)
- Student to teacher ratio: 16.38
- Colors: Green, gold, white
- Mascot: Bobcats
- Accreditation: Western Association of Schools and Colleges
- Website: phs.pusdk12.org

Paradise High School (PHS) is a public high school in Paradise, California, United States. It is part of the Paradise Unified School District.

The school's curriculum is organized into 13 subject area departments, and students can take up to six classes a day. Senior students can enroll concurrently at Butte Community College. Sports offered by the school are football, basketball, volleyball, cross country, swimming, tennis, soccer, track, golf, wrestling, baseball, softball, and cheerleading.

== History ==
=== Fire and relocation ===
When the Camp Fire destroyed most of the town of Paradise in November 2018, the school campus was mostly spared, losing only a half dozen temporary classrooms. The wildfire, the worst in California's history, burned down 19,000 structures and killed 85 people. The population of the town of Paradise plummeted from 26,800 to 2,034. The campus was shut down for the remainder of the 2018–2019 school year; students studied in nearby Chico, California or via online courses wherever they were staying. In June 2019, 220 seniors returned to the empty campus for their graduation ceremony on the football field.

When the school reopened its doors in the fall of 2019, an enrollment of 600 was expected, but 900 showed up on the first day of school. Many of the students had lost their homes in the fire, and some were living with friends or driving long distances to attend school each day.

The school made national news that same fall when its football team, less than a year after the fire, had an undefeated regular season and went to the section championship. Only three members of the varsity team were living in Paradise; the rest were commuting from locations up to 90 minutes away. But the team had vowed to make a championship run, saying they were "playing for the brothers we lost." (No Paradise High School students died in the fire.) Residents of Paradise and surrounding communities rallied behind the team. One player commented, "You look at the stands, the whole town of Paradise is here... it's really our only event right now, so it means everything." Paradise Mayor Jody Jones said, "The football team has come to represent all of us." Los Angeles Times columnist Bill Plaschke was inspired to write a book about the team and the town, Paradise Found: A High School Football Team’s Rise from the Ashes.

The San Francisco 49ers invited the team and coaches to a Monday Night Football game just four days after the fire, and honored them again at another home game in October 2021. At that time, the team's record was 5-1 and they were hoping to reach the state playoffs.

== Notable alumni ==
- Jamieson Greer, American trade official
- Jeff Maehl, former Oregon Ducks wide receiver
