= Stirling City, California =

- Unincorporated community
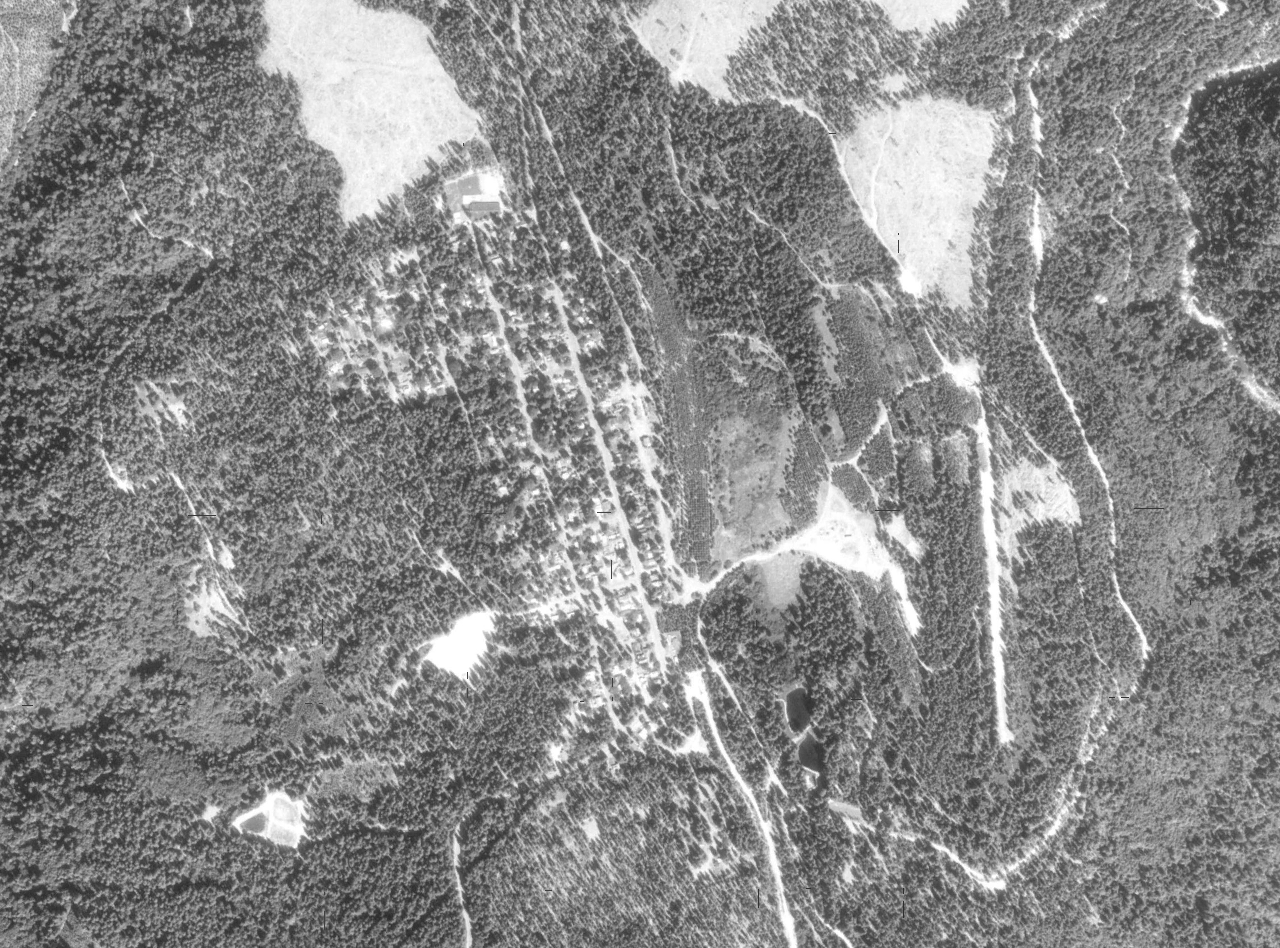
- USGS satellite photo of Stirling City

- Location in California Stirling City, California (the United States)
- Coordinates: 39°54′28″N 121°31′41″W
- Country: United States
- State: California
- County: Butte

Area
  - Total: 1.178 sq mi (3.051 km^{2})
  - Land: 1.177 sq mi (3.049 km^{2})
  - Water: 0.00077 sq mi (0.002 km^{2}) 0.07%
- Elevation: 3,570 ft (1,088 m)

Population (2020)
  - Total: 284
  - Density: 241/sq mi (93.1/km^{2})
- Time zone: UTC-8 (Pacific (PST))
  - Summer (DST): UTC-7 (PDT)
- ZIP Code: 95978
- Area codes: 530, 837
- GNIS feature ID: 235493; 2612488

Stirling City is a census-designated place in Butte County, California, United States, located on Paradise Ridge in the western foothills of the Sierra Nevada. Contrary to its name, Stirling City is not a city. Its ZIP Code is 95978 and the CDP is served by area code 530. It lies at an elevation of 3570 feet (1088 m). Stirling City had a population of 284 at the 2020 census.

Stirling City is located at 39°54′28″N 121°31′41″W, approximately 32 miles (45 km) northeast of Chico. It is built around a loop (which terminates a winding spur line) of the Southern Pacific Railroad, built to collect lumber from the Lassen National Forest.

== History ==
It was founded in 1903 by the Diamond Match Company of Barberton, Ohio, as a center for processing cut lumber from the surrounding forests. Diamond Match official Fred Clough named the city, taking the name from the boiler used at Diamond's Baberton plant, made by the Stirling Boiler Company.

The sawmill closed in the early 1970s. The land surrounding Stirling City is still harvested for timber, and the cleared area is farmed for cattle, fruit, and nuts.

A post office opened in 1903.

The town received minimal damage during the 2018 Camp Fire, during which it was protected by members of the California Department of Forestry and Fire Protection (Cal Fire).

== Demographics ==
Historical population
Census	Pop.	Note	%±
2010	295		—
2020	284		−3.7%
U.S. Decennial Census; 2010

Stirling City first appeared as a census designated place in the 2010 U.S. census.

The 2020 United States census reported that Stirling City had a population of 284. The population density was 241.3 inhabitants per square mile (93.2/km^{2}). The racial makeup of Stirling City was 194 (68.3%) White, 2 (0.7%) African American, 5 (1.8%) Native American, 1 (0.4%) Asian, 0 (0.0%) Pacific Islander, 25 (8.8%) from other races, and 57 (20.1%) from two or more races. Hispanic or Latino of any race were 41 persons (14.4%).

The whole population lived in households. There were 124 households, out of which 35 (28.2%) had children under the age of 18 living in them, 43 (34.7%) were married-couple households, 22 (17.7%) were cohabiting couple households, 25 (20.2%) had a female householder with no partner present, and 34 (27.4%) had a male householder with no partner present. 27 households (21.8%) were one person, and 9 (7.3%) were one person aged 65 or older. The average household size was 2.29. There were 82 families (66.1% of all households).

The age distribution was 67 people (23.6%) under the age of 18, 16 people (5.6%) aged 18 to 24, 56 people (19.7%) aged 25 to 44, 76 people (26.8%) aged 45 to 64, and 69 people (24.3%) who were 65 years of age or older. The median age was 46.0 years. For every 100 females, there were 121.9 males.

There were 158 housing units at an average density of 134.2 units per square mile (51.8 units/km^{2}), of which 124 (78.5%) were occupied. Of these, 69 (55.6%) were owner-occupied, and 55 (44.4%) were occupied by renters.

== Climate ==
Stirling City is categorized as being within the 8a USDA hardiness zone, meaning temperatures can get as low as 10 to 15 °F.

On average, there are four days each year where the temperature rises above 100 F. There are also two days each year on which the temperature drops below 20 F.

Climate data for Stirling City
Month	Jan	Feb	Mar	Apr	May	Jun	Jul	Aug	Sep	Oct	Nov	Dec	Year
Record high °F (°C)	82.0 (27.8)	82.0 (27.8)	87.0 (30.6)	94.0 (34.4)	97.0 (36.1)	108.0 (42.2)	109.0 (42.8)	112.0 (44.4)	106.0 (41.1)	102.0 (38.9)	90.0 (32.2)	86.0 (30.0)	112.0 (44.4)
Mean daily maximum °F (°C)	51.1 (10.6)	54.3 (12.4)	58.6 (14.8)	64.9 (18.3)	73.0 (22.8)	81.8 (27.7)	90.2 (32.3)	89.1 (31.7)	83.2 (28.4)	72.4 (22.4)	59.1 (15.1)	51.7 (10.9)	69.1 (20.6)
Mean daily minimum °F (°C)	31.7 (−0.2)	33.1 (0.6)	34.9 (1.6)	38.5 (3.6)	44.0 (6.7)	50.1 (10.1)	55.1 (12.8)	53.8 (12.1)	49.8 (9.9)	43.6 (6.4)	36.4 (2.4)	32.3 (0.2)	41.9 (5.5)
Record low °F (°C)	−2.0 (−18.9)	11.0 (−11.7)	14.0 (−10.0)	16.0 (−8.9)	21.0 (−6.1)	31.0 (−0.6)	39.0 (3.9)	28.0 (−2.2)	30.0 (−1.1)	19.0 (−7.2)	15.0 (−9.4)	5.0 (−15.0)	−2.0 (−18.9)
Average precipitation inches (mm)	12.2 (310)	11.2 (280)	8.6 (220)	4.8 (120)	2.5 (64)	1 (25)	0.1 (2.5)	0.2 (5.1)	0.9 (23)	3.5 (89)	7.6 (190)	11.7 (300)	74.1 (1,880)
Average snowfall inches (cm)	11 (28)	4.9 (12)	6.7 (17)	1.3 (3.3)	0.0 (0.0)	0.0 (0.0)	0.0 (0.0)	0.0 (0.0)	0.0 (0.0)	0.0 (0.0)	1.1 (2.8)	4.4 (11)	29.4 (74.1)
Source: Weatherbase

== Education ==
Sterling City is served by the Paradise Unified School District.

== In popular culture ==
- Stirling City, CA, is depicted as a location in early stories of the Slender Man internet mythology.
