= Butte Creek Canyon, California =

- Unincorporated community
- Location of Butte Creek Canyon in Butte County, California.

- Position in California.
- Coordinates: 39°44′39″N 121°42′26″W
- Country: United States
- State: California
- County: Butte

Area
  - Total: 20.54 sq mi (53.20 km^{2})
  - Land: 20.51 sq mi (53.13 km^{2})
  - Water: 0.027 sq mi (0.07 km^{2}) 0.13%
- Elevation: 1,024 ft (312 m)

Population (2020)
  - Total: 780
  - Density: 38/sq mi (15/km^{2})
- Time zone: UTC-8 (Pacific (PST))
  - Summer (DST): UTC-7 (PDT)
- GNIS feature ID: 2612473

Butte Creek Canyon is an unincorporated community and census-designated place (CDP) in Butte County, California, United States. Butte Creek Canyon sits at an elevation of 1024 feet (312 m) in the Sierra Nevada foothills. The 2020 United States census reported Butte Creek Canyon's population was 780, down from 1,086 at the 2010 census. In November 2018, the Camp Fire destroyed a large portion of the town.

== Demographics ==
Historical population
Census	Pop.	Note	%±
2010	1,086		—
2020	780		−28.2%
U.S. Decennial Census; 2010

Butte Creek Canyon first appeared as a census designated place in the 2010 U.S. census.

=== 2020 census ===
As of the 2020 census, Butte Creek Canyon had a population of 780. The population density was 38.0 inhabitants per square mile (14.7/km^{2}). The median age was 58.4 years. The age distribution was 15.6% under the age of 18, 3.7% aged 18 to 24, 14.6% aged 25 to 44, 30.5% aged 45 to 64, and 35.5% who were 65 years of age or older. For every 100 females there were 92.6 males, and for every 100 females age 18 and over there were 98.2 males age 18 and over. 0.0% of residents lived in urban areas, while 100.0% lived in rural areas.

There were 323 households in Butte Creek Canyon, of which 23.8% had children under the age of 18 living in them. Of all households, 57.0% were married-couple households, 8.0% were cohabiting couple households, 22.9% were households with a male householder and no spouse or partner present, and 12.1% were households with a female householder and no spouse or partner present. About 18.3% of all households were made up of individuals and 10.9% had someone living alone who was 65 years of age or older. The average household size was 2.41. There were 234 families (72.4% of all households).

There were 392 housing units at an average density of 19.1 units per square mile (7.4 units/km^{2}), of which 323 (82.4%) were occupied. Of occupied units, 84.2% were owner-occupied, and 15.8% were occupied by renters. The homeowner vacancy rate was 2.5% and the rental vacancy rate was 13.6%.

Racial composition as of the 2020 census
Race	Number	Percent
White	679	87.1%
Black or African American	0	0.0%
American Indian and Alaska Native	10	1.3%
Asian	13	1.7%
Native Hawaiian and Other Pacific Islander	4	0.5%
Some other race	18	2.3%
Two or more races	56	7.2%
Hispanic or Latino (of any race)	66	8.5%

== Education ==
Almost all of the CDP is served by the Chico Unified School District. A small part of the CDP extends into the Paradise Unified School District.
