= Rancho Jacinto =

Mexican land grant in California

- Location in California Rancho Jacinto (the United States)
- Coordinates: 39°59′00″N 122°00′50″W
- Country: United States
- State: California
- County: Glenn County

Rancho Jacinto was a 35,487-acre (143.61 km^{2}) Mexican land grant in present-day Glenn County, California given in 1844 by Governor Manuel Micheltorena to Jacinto Rodriguez. The grant extended along the west bank of the Sacramento River, and encompassed present-day Ordbend, Bayliss, Jacinto and Glenn.

== History ==
Jacinto Rodríguez (1815–1880) was a civil and military officer of the Mexican Government in Monterey. Rodriguez received the eight square league Rancho Jacinto in 1844. He was not required to occupy the land, as his services were needed in the army. He was subsequently transferred from the military to the civil service, and worked until July, 1846, in the custom house at Monterey, except at intervals when he was called into military service.

Dr. William H. McKee, a Scotch physician living in Monterey, acquired Rancho Jacinto.

With the cession of California to the United States following the Mexican–American War, the 1848 Treaty of Guadalupe Hidalgo provided that the land grants would be honored. As required by the Land Act of 1851, a claim for Rancho Jacinto was filed with the Public Land Commission in 1852, and the grant was patented to William H. McKee in 1859.

Dr. Hugh James Glenn (1824–1883) bought 8,000 acres (32.4 km^{2}) on the north end of Rancho Jacinto. He continue to add to his holdings, until he had purchased the entire Rancho and also 6,000 acres (24.3 km^{2}) of Rancho Larkin’s Children. Glenn was shot and killed at his home by Huram Miller in 1883. The land was later sold in small parcels, a great part purchased by the Sacramento Valley Irrigation Company and subdivided later years.
