= 1948 United States presidential election in California =

- November 2, 1948
- Turnout: 80.54% (of registered voters) ▼5.59 pp 66.77% (of eligible voters) ▲1.05 pp

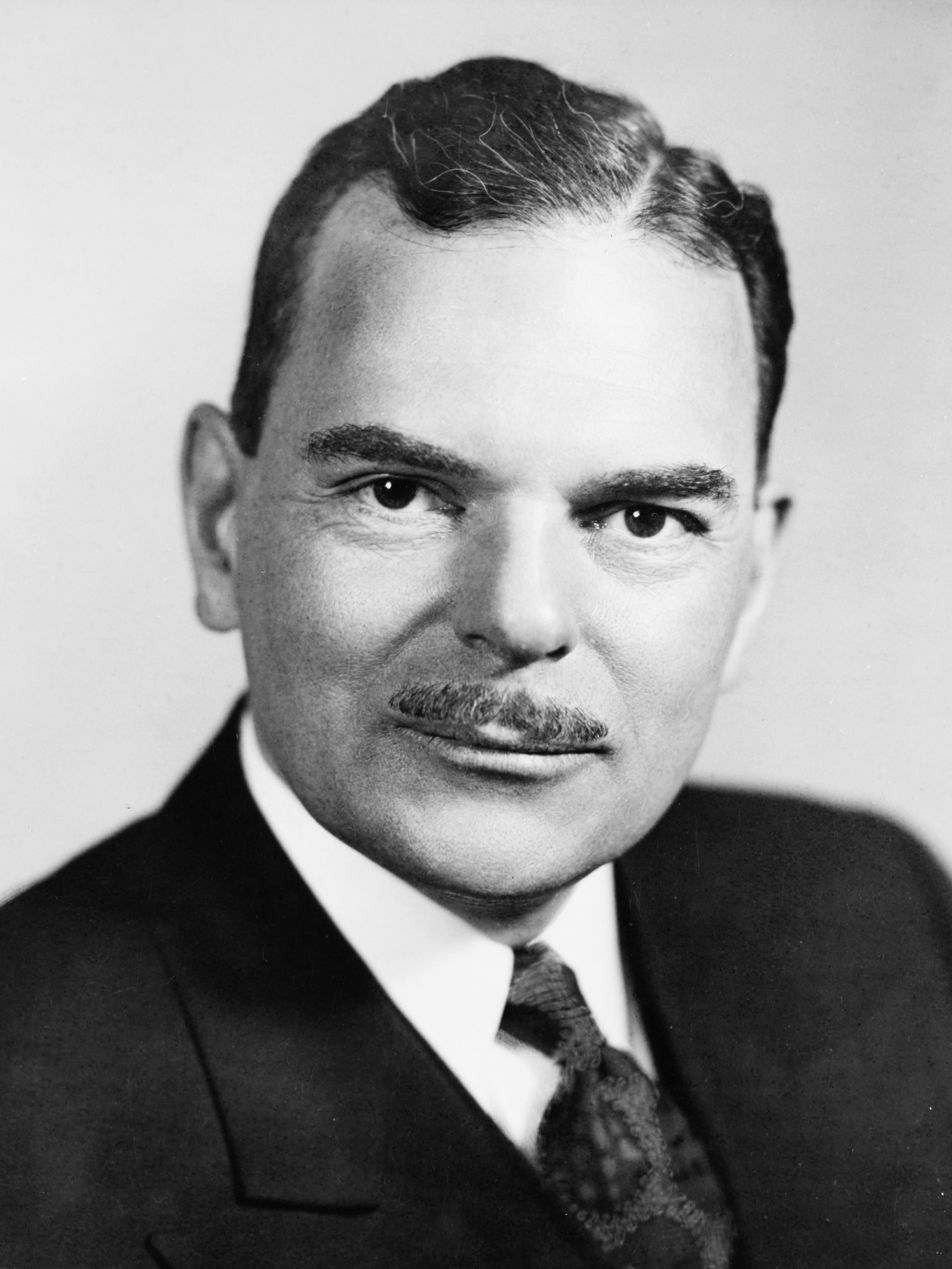
Nominee	Harry S. Truman	Thomas E. Dewey
Party	Democratic	Republican
Home state	Missouri	New York
Running mate	Alben W. Barkley	Earl Warren
Electoral vote	25	0
Popular vote	1,913,134	1,895,269
Percentage	47.57%	47.13%
County results
Truman
40–50%
50–60%
60–70%
Dewey
40–50%
50–60%
60–70%
70–80%
President before election
Harry S. Truman
Democratic
Elected President
Harry S. Truman
Democratic

The 1948 United States presidential election in California took place on November 2, 1948, as part of the 1948 United States presidential election. State voters chose 25 representatives, or electors, to the Electoral College, who voted for president and vice president.

California narrowly voted for the Democratic incumbent, Harry S. Truman, over the Republican challenger, New York Governor Thomas E. Dewey, even though Dewey's running mate was California Governor Earl Warren. California was the tipping-point state for Truman's victory.

The Progressive Party submitted 464,000 signatures, greater than the 275,970 required, from all but one of California's counties a month before the deadline. The final signature amount submitted was 482,781 with around 295,000 validated.

== Results ==
1948 United States presidential election in California
Party	Candidate	Votes	Percentage	Electoral votes
Democratic	Harry S. Truman (incumbent)	1,913,134	47.57%	25
Republican	Thomas E. Dewey	1,895,269	47.13%	0
Independent Progressive	Henry A. Wallace	190,381	4.73%	0
Prohibition	Claude A. Watson	16,926	0.42%	0
No party	Norman Thomas (write-in)	3,459	0.09%	0
No party	Strom Thurmond (write-in)	1,228	0.03%	0
No party	Write-ins	813	0.02%	0
No party	Edward A. Teichert (write-in)	195	0.00%	0
No party	Farrell Dobbs (write-in)	133	0.00%	0
Invalid or blank votes				—
Totals		4,021,538	100.00%	25
Voter turnout				—

=== Results by county ===
County	Harry S. Truman Democratic		Thomas E. Dewey Republican		Henry A. Wallace Progressive		Various candidates Other parties		Margin		Total votes cast
County	#	%	#	%	#	%	#	%	#	%	Total votes cast
Alameda	154,549	47.80%	150,588	46.57%	16,853	5.21%	1,341	0.41%	3,961	1.23%	323,331
Alpine	25	18.12%	106	76.81%	6	4.35%	1	0.72%	-81	-58.69%	138
Amador	2,334	57.45%	1,578	38.84%	117	2.88%	34	0.84%	756	18.61%	4,063
Butte	10,133	45.68%	10,948	49.36%	936	4.22%	164	0.74%	-815	-3.68%	22,181
Calaveras	1,995	49.42%	1,888	46.77%	128	3.17%	26	0.64%	107	2.65%	4,037
Colusa	2,020	51.78%	1,803	46.22%	69	1.77%	9	0.23%	217	5.56%	3,901
Contra Costa	50,277	55.02%	36,958	40.45%	3,868	4.23%	273	0.30%	13,319	14.57%	91,376
Del Norte	1,172	41.27%	1,541	54.26%	121	4.26%	6	0.21%	-369	-12.99%	2,840
El Dorado	3,493	51.95%	2,894	43.04%	289	4.30%	48	0.71%	599	8.91%	6,724
Fresno	47,762	58.49%	30,379	37.20%	3,056	3.74%	468	0.57%	17,383	21.29%	81,665
Glenn	2,578	46.64%	2,819	50.99%	108	1.95%	23	0.42%	-241	-4.35%	5,528
Humboldt	11,268	48.43%	10,979	47.19%	909	3.91%	110	0.47%	289	1.24%	23,266
Imperial	5,301	44.89%	6,217	52.64%	228	1.93%	64	0.54%	-916	-7.75%	11,810
Inyo	1,539	40.21%	2,135	55.79%	138	3.61%	15	0.39%	-596	-15.58%	3,827
Kern	33,029	56.16%	24,464	41.60%	1,109	1.89%	209	0.36%	8,565	14.56%	58,811
Kings	6,909	59.97%	4,289	37.23%	219	1.90%	104	0.90%	2,620	22.74%	11,521
Lake	1,999	37.48%	3,054	57.27%	238	4.46%	42	0.79%	-1,055	-19.79%	5,333
Lassen	3,632	62.91%	1,960	33.95%	159	2.75%	22	0.38%	1,672	28.96%	5,773
Los Angeles	812,690	47.00%	804,232	46.51%	101,085	5.85%	11,075	0.64%	8,458	0.49%	1,729,082
Madera	5,226	58.18%	3,416	38.03%	277	3.08%	63	0.70%	1,810	20.15%	8,982
Marin	12,540	38.17%	18,747	57.06%	1,513	4.61%	55	0.17%	-6,207	-18.89%	32,855
Mariposa	983	39.85%	1,378	55.86%	91	3.69%	15	0.61%	-395	-16.01%	2,467
Mendocino	5,593	44.06%	6,368	50.53%	642	5.09%	40	0.32%	-775	-6.47%	12,643
Merced	9,959	54.95%	7,721	42.60%	360	1.99%	84	0.46%	2,238	12.35%	18,124
Modoc	1,607	50.53%	1,480	46.54%	82	2.58%	11	0.35%	127	3.99%	3,180
Mono	255	30.54%	541	64.79%	33	3.95%	6	0.72%	-286	-34.25%	835
Monterey	15,704	46.10%	17,233	50.59%	959	2.82%	167	0.49%	-1,529	-4.49%	34,063
Napa	7,207	43.64%	8,724	52.82%	477	2.89%	108	0.65%	-1,517	-9.18%	16,516
Nevada	3,914	47.01%	3,917	47.05%	454	5.45%	41	0.49%	-3	-0.04%	8,326
Orange	29,018	36.36%	48,587	60.88%	1,545	1.94%	664	0.83%	-19,569	-24.52%	79,814
Placer	8,837	58.49%	5,570	36.87%	632	4.18%	70	0.46%	3,267	21.62%	15,109
Plumas	3,125	61.78%	1,657	32.76%	257	5.08%	19	0.38%	1,468	29.02%	5,058
Riverside	23,305	40.28%	32,209	55.66%	1,694	2.93%	656	1.13%	-8,904	-15.38%	57,864
Sacramento	54,197	58.38%	35,074	37.78%	3,185	3.43%	386	0.42%	19,123	20.60%	92,842
San Benito	2,096	42.03%	2,775	55.64%	90	1.80%	26	0.52%	-679	-13.61%	4,987
San Bernardino	45,691	47.68%	46,570	48.59%	2,746	2.87%	831	0.87%	-879	-0.91%	95,838
San Diego	98,217	47.80%	101,552	49.43%	4,815	2.34%	875	0.43%	-3,335	-1.63%	205,459
San Francisco	167,726	47.82%	160,135	45.66%	21,492	6.13%	1,356	0.39%	7,591	2.16%	350,709
San Joaquin	27,908	47.01%	29,135	49.08%	2,051	3.46%	267	0.45%	-1,227	-2.07%	59,361
San Luis Obispo	8,135	42.14%	10,325	53.49%	696	3.61%	148	0.77%	-2,190	-11.35%	19,304
San Mateo	34,215	39.66%	48,909	56.69%	2,993	3.47%	155	0.18%	-14,694	-17.03%	86,272
Santa Barbara	13,085	38.04%	19,998	58.13%	1,122	3.26%	195	0.57%	-6,913	-20.09%	34,400
Santa Clara	41,905	42.11%	52,982	53.25%	4,049	4.07%	566	0.57%	-11,077	-11.14%	99,502
Santa Cruz	9,862	36.95%	15,395	57.68%	1,084	4.06%	349	1.31%	-5,533	-20.73%	26,690
Shasta	7,177	56.86%	5,010	39.69%	402	3.18%	34	0.27%	2,167	17.17%	12,623
Sierra	660	52.46%	546	43.40%	48	3.82%	4	0.32%	114	9.06%	1,258
Siskiyou	6,749	54.00%	5,315	42.53%	400	3.20%	34	0.27%	1,434	11.47%	12,498
Solano	23,257	63.50%	12,345	33.71%	962	2.63%	60	0.16%	10,912	29.79%	36,624
Sonoma	16,026	40.08%	22,077	55.21%	1,705	4.26%	176	0.44%	-6,051	-15.13%	39,984
Stanislaus	18,350	47.82%	18,564	48.38%	899	2.34%	558	1.45%	-214	-0.56%	38,371
Sutter	3,362	45.08%	3,913	52.47%	130	1.74%	53	0.71%	-551	-7.39%	7,458
Tehama	2,920	44.72%	3,348	51.27%	206	3.15%	56	0.86%	-428	-6.55%	6,530
Trinity	1,053	48.68%	975	45.08%	126	5.83%	9	0.42%	78	3.60%	2,163
Tulare	19,681	50.22%	18,414	46.98%	797	2.03%	300	0.77%	1,267	3.24%	39,192
Tuolumne	2,561	46.78%	2,639	48.21%	249	4.55%	25	0.46%	-78	-1.43%	5,474
Ventura	18,100	54.77%	13,930	42.15%	856	2.59%	163	0.49%	4,170	12.62%	33,049
Yolo	6,655	52.47%	5,560	43.83%	409	3.22%	60	0.47%	1,095	8.64%	12,684
Yuba	3,608	49.68%	3,403	46.85%	217	2.99%	35	0.48%	205	2.83%	7,263
Total	1,913,134	47.57%	1,895,269	47.13%	190,381	4.73%	22,754	0.57%	17,865	0.44%	4,021,538

==== Counties that flipped from Democratic to Republican ====
- Butte
- Glenn
- Marin
- Mariposa
- Mendocino
- Monterey
- Napa
- Nevada
- San Bernardino
- San Diego
- San Joaquin
- San Luis Obispo
- San Mateo
- Santa Barbara
- Santa Clara
- Stanislaus
- Tehama
- Tuolumne

== See also ==
- United States presidential elections in California

== Works cited ==
- Schmidt, Karl (1960). Henry A. Wallace: Quixotic Crusade 1948. Syracuse University Press. ISBN 978-0-8156-0020-6.
