= Kyle Lohse =

American baseball player (born 1978)

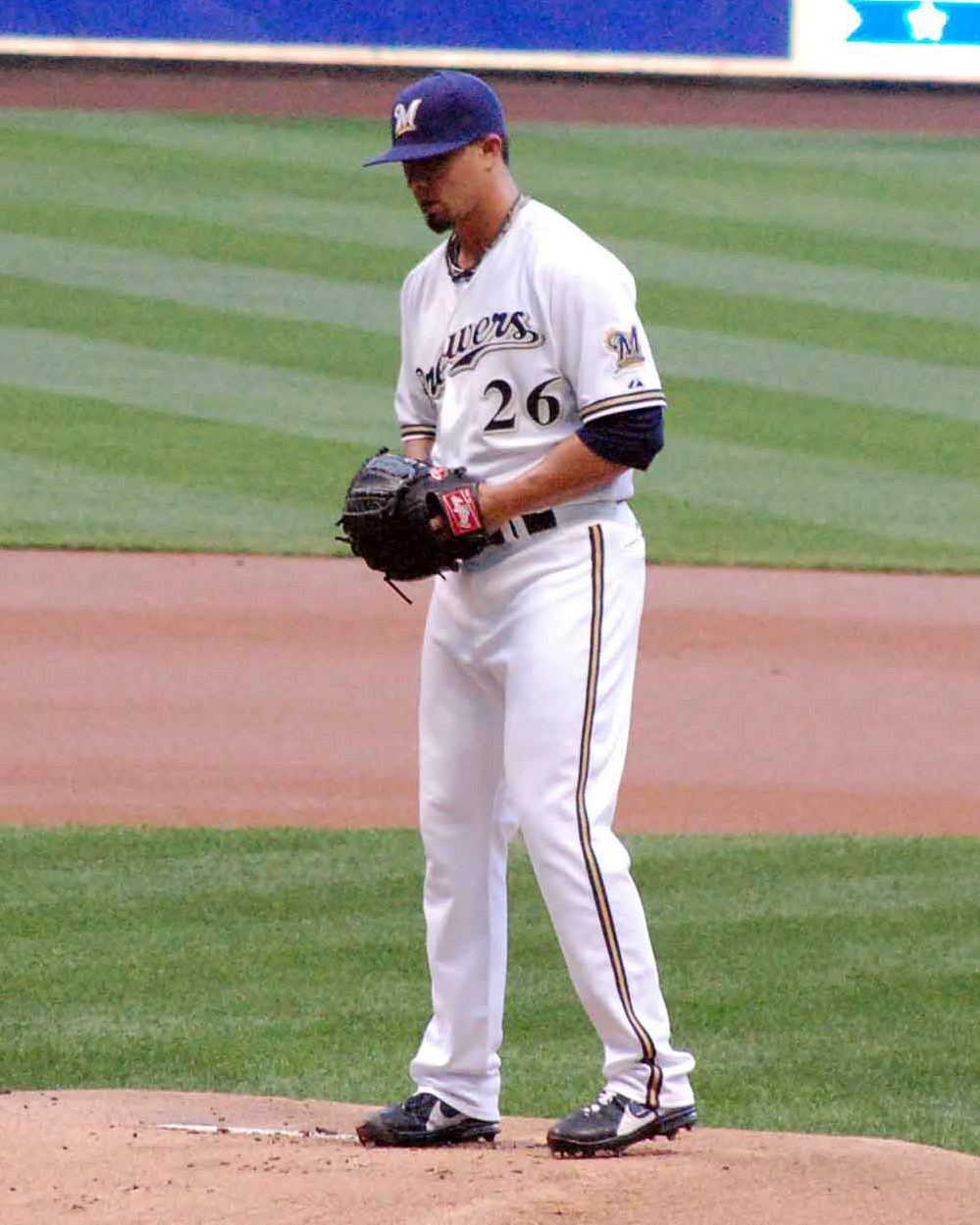
- Lohse with the Milwaukee Brewers
- Pitcher
- Born: October 4, 1978 (age 48); Chico, California, U.S.
- Batted: Right Threw: Right

MLB debut
- June 22, 2001, for the Minnesota Twins

Last MLB appearance
- July 19, 2016, for the Texas Rangers

MLB statistics
- Win–loss record: 147–143
- Earned run average: 4.40
- Strikeouts: 1,615
- Stats at Baseball Reference

Teams
- Minnesota Twins (2001–2006); Cincinnati Reds (2006–2007); Philadelphia Phillies (2007); St. Louis Cardinals (2008–2012); Milwaukee Brewers (2013–2015); Texas Rangers (2016)

Career highlights and awards
- World Series champion (2011)

Kyle Matthew Lohse (/ˈloʊʃ/; born October 4, 1978) is an American former professional baseball pitcher. He played in Major League Baseball (MLB) for the Minnesota Twins, Cincinnati Reds, Philadelphia Phillies, St. Louis Cardinals, Milwaukee Brewers, and Texas Rangers.

As of 2014, he was one of only three active non-Hispanic Native American players in MLB, with the others being Joba Chamberlain of the Cleveland Indians and Jacoby Ellsbury of the New York Yankees.

On June 26, 2015, Lohse became the 14th pitcher to defeat all 30 MLB teams. In 2014 he pitched a complete 9 inning shutout for the Brewers, a feat not duplicated by a Brewer pitcher until Adrian Houser on September 4, 2021.

== Early life ==
Lohse was raised in Ord Bend, California, and attended nearby Hamilton Union High School in Hamilton City, California. He followed in the footsteps of his parents, Larry and Leslie, who were both star athletes when they attended the same high school in the 1970s. He played basketball, baseball, and football. While playing baseball, he was an All-Conference pick in all four years of high school. He was also on the Honor Roll and took several advanced classes. He graduated in 1996.

Lohse's mother has Nomlaki Native American and Filipino ancestry and his father has German ancestry. Growing up, Lohse did not think of himself as anything other than "American" because the Nomlaki tribe did not reestablish itself until 1996.

After high school, Lohse attended Butte College.

== Major leagues ==
=== Minnesota Twins ===
The Chicago Cubs selected Lohse in the 29th round of the 1996 Major League Baseball draft. In 1999, the Cubs traded Lohse with Jason Ryan to the Minnesota Twins for Rick Aguilera and Scott Downs. Lohse made his MLB debut with the Twins on June 22, 2001.

In 2002, Lohse's first full year as a starter, he posted a 13–8 record with an ERA of 4.23. He followed that with success in 2003, starting 33 games and going 14–11 with a 4.61 ERA. In 2004, he did not fare as well, going 9–13 with a 5.34 ERA. Lohse has been to one ALCS, with the Twins in 2002.

On May 17, 2006, he was sent down to AAA Rochester, and the Twins called up replacement pitcher Boof Bonser. On June 9, Matt Guerrier broke his thumb and Lohse was recalled.

=== Cincinnati Reds ===
On July 31, 2006, Lohse was traded to the Cincinnati Reds for minor-league pitcher Zach Ward. Lohse made his first start for the Reds on August 17, 2006.

=== Philadelphia Phillies ===
On July 30, 2007, Lohse was traded to the Philadelphia Phillies for minor-league pitcher Matt Maloney. After his departure from the Reds, Lohse's performance dropped off slightly, and in 11 starts with the Phillies, Lohse went 3–0, receiving a large number of no-decisions due to late offensive rallies by the Phillies lineup. His ERA for the Phillies swelled to 4.72, and he averaged fewer than six innings pitched per start.

=== St. Louis Cardinals ===
On March 14, 2008, Lohse signed a one-year deal with the St. Louis Cardinals worth $4.25 million.

Lohse was one of the biggest surprises for the Cardinals in the first half of the 2008 season, going 11–2 with a 3.39 ERA. He was later suspended for five games for throwing at Reds' pitcher Edinson Vólquez. Lohse appealed the ruling and pitched as he awaited a decision on his appeal, but Lohse eventually dropped his appeal and served his suspension in full.

Lohse and the Cardinals agreed to a four-year, $41-million contract extension on September 29, 2008.

On April 17, 2010, in a 20-inning game against the New York Mets, Lohse entered the game playing left field in the 18th inning while shortstop Felipe López pitched.

On August 28, 2011, Lohse won his 100th game as a pitcher when the Cardinals defeated the Pittsburgh Pirates 7–4. That year – during which the Cardinals won the World Series – he led the Cardinals with 14 wins and a 3.39 ERA. In the Cardinals’ come from behind win in Game Six of the 2011 World Series against the Texas Rangers, Lohse pinch hit in the 10th inning and delivered a key sacrifice bunt, moving the eventual tying run into scoring position. The Cardinals won the game in the 11th inning, forcing a Game Seven, on infielder David Freese’s lead-off home run.

Lohse was named the Cardinals' Opening Day starting pitcher in 2012. In that game, Lohse did not give up a hit until the seventh inning, when José Reyes hit a single to right field. In total, Lohse threw 7 1/3 innings, giving up two hits while allowing one run and striking out three. Thus, Lohse became the first pitcher to earn a win at the new Marlins Park.

His 16–3 won-lost record for 2012 led the National League in winning percentage, at .842, among eligible pitchers. He became a free agent following the 2012 season.

=== Milwaukee Brewers ===
On March 25, 2013, it was confirmed that Lohse had signed a three-year, $33 million contract with the Milwaukee Brewers. Despite moving to one of the most hitter-friendly parks in Miller Park to pitch with Milwaukee, Lohse continued to pitch well. In his first season with the Brewers, Lohse went 11-10 with a 3.35 ERA over the course of 198 innings pitched.

In 2014 Lohse pitched to a 3.54 ERA over the course of 31 starts and 198 and third innings pitched for the Milwaukee Brewers and struck out 141 batters, only two short of his career high. He became a free agent following the 2015 season.

=== Texas Rangers ===
On May 13, 2016, Lohse signed a minor league deal with the Texas Rangers worth $2 million, with another $1.5 million in performance bonuses. After two rough starts in which he allowed more than 10 runs, he was designated for assignment. Lohse refused his outright assignment and became a free agent on July 31.

=== Kansas City Royals ===
After sitting out the 2017 season, Lohse signed a minor league contract with the Kansas City Royals on March 31, 2018. On May 10, 2018, Lohse announced his retirement from baseball via his Instagram.

== Pitching style ==
Lohse's arsenal features a two-seam fastball at 90-91 mph, a biting slider in the mid 80s, a downward-fading changeup in the low 80s, and a 12-6 curveball in the low-to-mid 70s. At the beginning of his career, and until he began pitching with the Cardinals, his primary fastball was a normal four-seam fastball in the low 90s. After signing with St. Louis and under the tutelage of Dave Duncan, Lohse started using a two-seamer, a major reason for his development. Developing his two-seamer and refining his off-speed pitches, Lohse has become known as a command pitcher capable of inducing many ground-ball outs without walking many batters. He is not a major strikeout pitcher, but in 2012 set a new career high in strikeouts with 143 in 211 innings, giving him 6.1 strikeouts per nine innings, with only 1.6 walks.

== Personal life ==
Lohse and his ex-wife, Gabrielle, have a son and a daughter together.

During his career in Minnesota, Lohse dedicated himself to working with Cars for Courage, an organization that serves disabled children through sports programs and activities.
