= Rancho Larkin's Children =

Mexican land grant in California

Coordinates: 39.440°N 122.020°W

Rancho Larkin's Children was a 44,364-acre (179.53 km^{2}) Mexican land grant in present-day Glenn County and Colusa County, California given in 1844 by Governor Manuel Micheltorena to Francisco Larkin, Caroline Ann Larkin, and Sophia Adelaide Larkin, children of Thomas O. Larkin. The grant extended south from Glenn and Rancho Jacinto along both banks of the Sacramento River, and encompassed present-day Butte City, Princeton and Codora.

== History ==
Thomas O. Larkin (1802 –1858), consul of the United States at Monterey, was unwilling to become a Mexican citizen, and thus could not obtain a direct land grant. In 1844 Larkin applied for the naturalization of three of his children and a land grant for them. Larkin had John Bidwell locate it for him. Manuel Micheltorena, heavily in debt to Larkin, complied. Two days after the children where naturalized, they received the ten square league grant. Larkin arranged for John S. Williams to run the rancho.

John Smith Williams (Feb.1818-May 1849) came to California in 1843 from Missouri. His brother, Isaac Williams, owned Rancho Santa Ana del Chino. John S. Williams and his brother James owned the north half of Rancho Farwell. In 1847, John S. Williams married Maria Louisa Gordon. After three years, Williams left Rancho Larkin's Children in 1849, but died shortly thereafter.

With the cession of California to the United States following the Mexican-American War, the 1848 Treaty of Guadalupe Hidalgo provided that the land grants would be honored. As required by the Land Act of 1851, a claim for Rancho Larkin's Children was filed with the Public Land Commission in 1852, and the grant was patented to Francisco Larkin, Caroline Ann Larkin, and Sophia Adelaide Larkin in 1857.

Senator John Boggs (1829–1899), born in Missouri, came to Colusa County in 1854 and bought 6,000 acres (24 km^{2}) of Rancho Larkin's Children. In 1866 be was elected to the California State Senate and died in office.

In 1855, Larkin sold the south half of this grant to settlers, and in 1866 the residue was sold to A. Montgomery.

== See also ==
- List of California Ranchos
- Ranchos of Colusa County, California
- Ranchos of Glenn County, California
