= Hugh J. Glenn =

American politician and businessman (1824–1883)

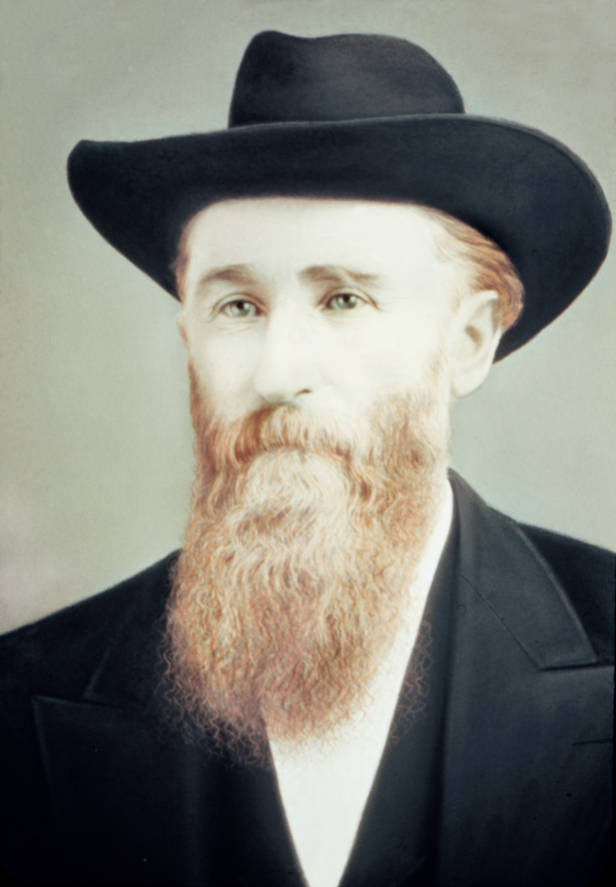
- Hugh J. Glenn
- Born: Hugh James Glenn; September 18, 1824; Staunton, Virginia, U.S.
- Died: February 17, 1883 (aged 58); Jacinto, California, U.S.
- Occupation: farmer
- Spouse: Nancy Harrison Abernathy
- Children: 8

Hugh James Glenn (September 18, 1824 – February 17, 1883) was a 19th-century medical doctor, stockman, wheat farmer and politician in California. In 1879, he ran in the California gubernatorial election as the candidate of both the Democratic and the New Constitution parties but lost to Republican George C. Perkins. At the time of his death he was considered the largest wheat-grower in California. Glenn County, California is named after him.

== Early life and education ==
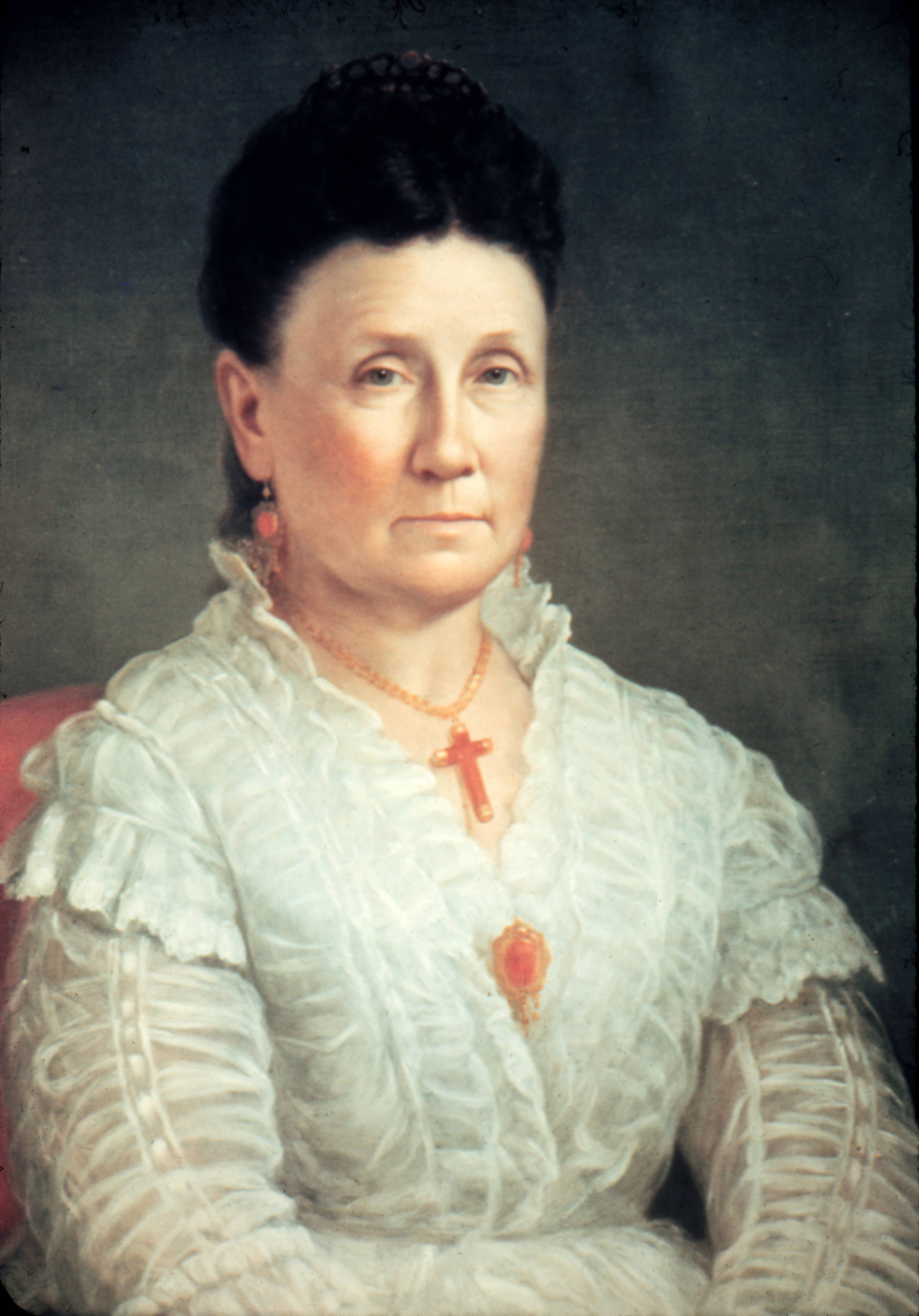
Nancy Abernathy Glenn courtesy of California State University, Chico, Meriam Library Special Collections.

Glenn was born near Staunton, Virginia, in 1824. He was the son of George Glenn (1802-1875) and Mary Gleave Anderson (1805-1845). His father came to Monroe County, Missouri in 1831 and settled in Paris, Missouri. Hugh went to school in Paris and was educated as a physician at McDowell's Medical College in St. Louis, Missouri. Glenn served with Colonel Alexander William Doniphan's Missouri Volunteers in the Mexican–American War, returning to St. Louis in 1847. He resumed his medical studies at Cooper Medical College, where he graduated with honors in 1849. He practiced in St. Louis for two years. He married Nancy Harrison Abernathy, daughter of Missouri politician James R. Abernathy, on March 15, 1849, in Monroe, Missouri.

On May 3, 1849, Glenn left Missouri to join the California Gold Rush, leaving with an ox team and wagon. He sold his gold claim and operated a livery stable in Sacramento, later selling it for a good profit. He returned to Missouri in 1852 with $5,000 and came back to California in 1853, bringing his family with him.

== Ranching and political career ==
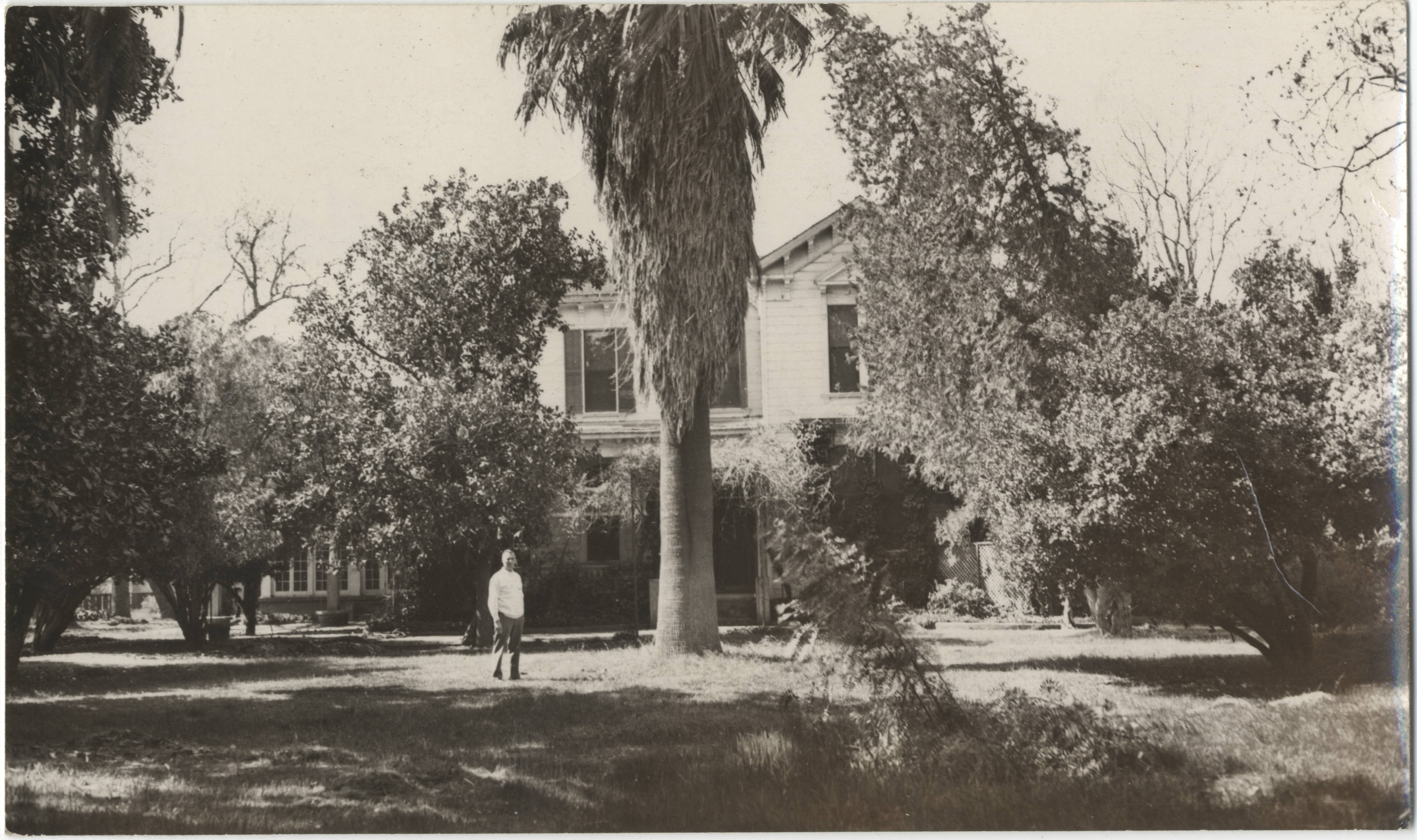
Hugh J. Glenn's Home in Glenn, California.

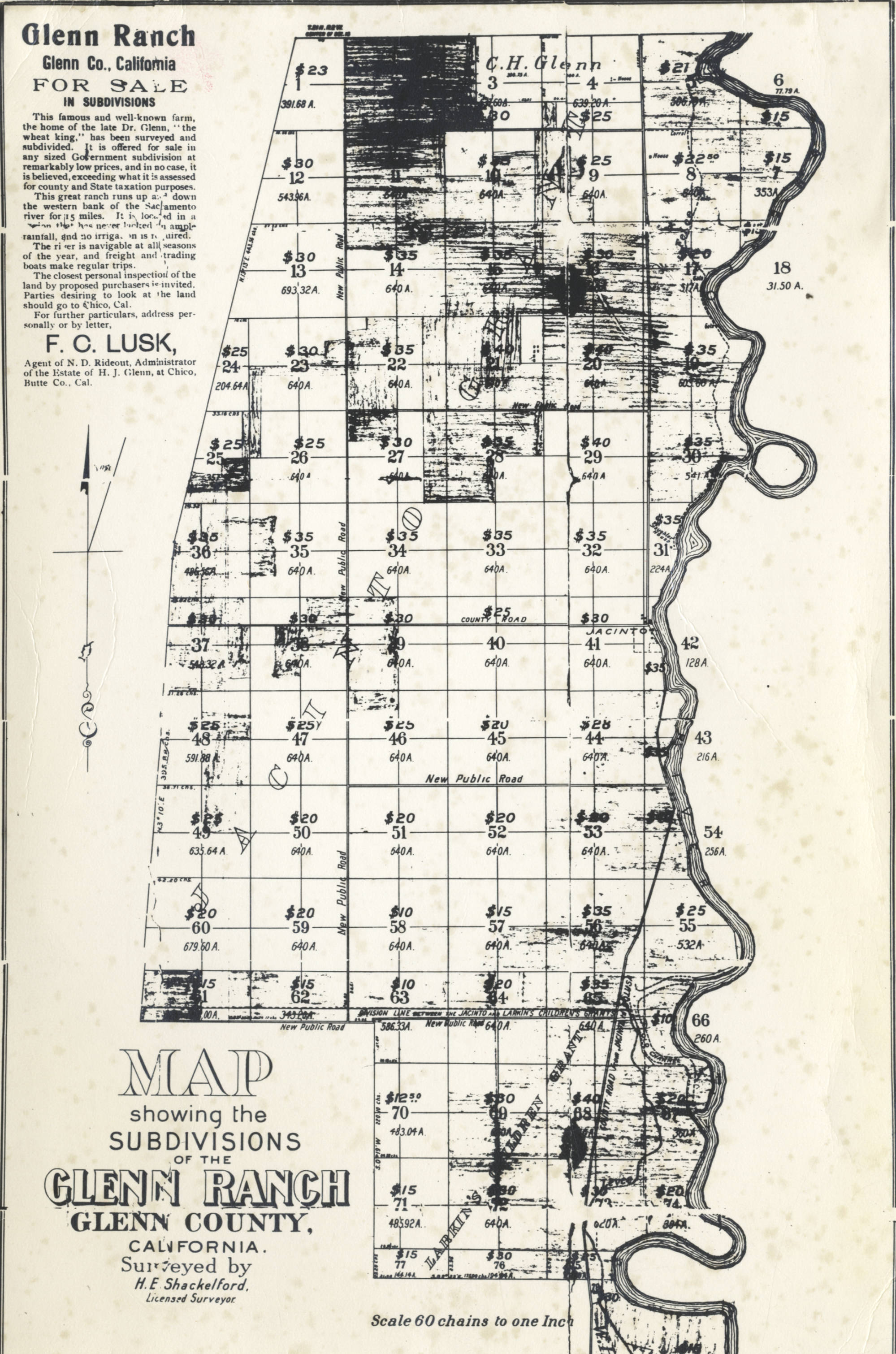
Map showing subdivisions of the Glenn Ranch, Glenn County, California.

Glenn became a cattle rancher, and in 1868 moved to Jacinto, California, then in Colusa County. He bought 8,000 acres (32.4 km^{2}) on the north end of Rancho Jacinto. He continued to add to his holdings, until he had purchased the entire Rancho and also 6,000 acres (24.3 km^{2}) of Rancho Larkin’s Children. In all, he had 55,000 acres (222.6 km^{2}), cultivating 6,000 acres (24.3 km^{2}) of them in grain, earning him the nickname of the "Wheat King" of California. He had his own machines and blacksmith shops, boring, turning and planing machines. He employed 50 men in seeding and 150 men in harvest. On August 8, 1879, he brought in 5,779 bushels of wheat in one day.

Peter French moved to Jacinto where he met and accepted employment as a horse breaker with Glenn. French was promoted to foreman. In 1872, Glenn sent French to Oregon with 1,200 head of Shorthorn cattle, where he bought land. In 1883, French married Glenn’s daughter, Ella Abernathy Glenn.

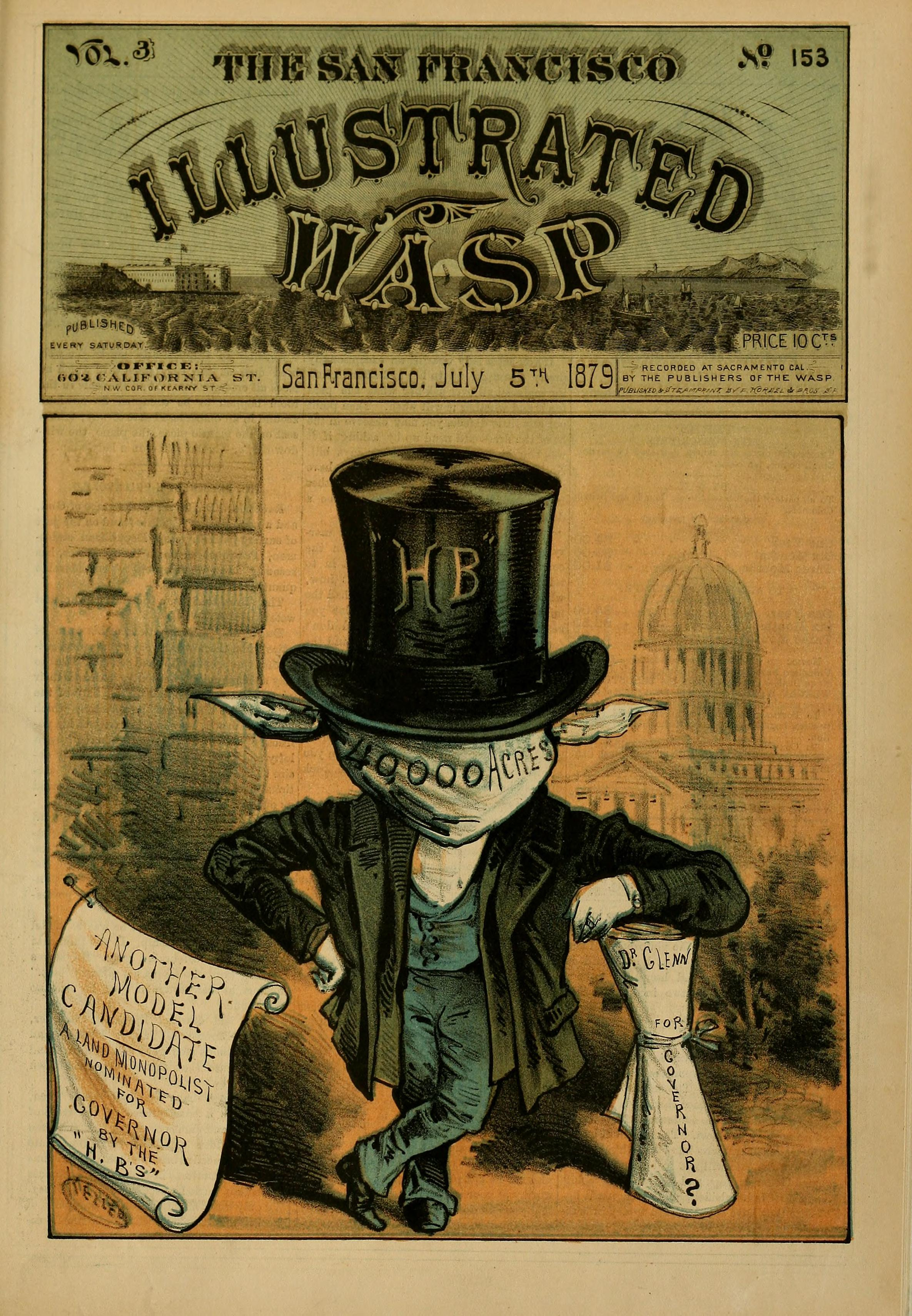
"Another Model Candidate, a Land Monopolist Nominated for Governor of California by the 'H. B.'s,'" a caricature of Glenn by George Frederick Keller published in The Wasp, July 5, 1879

Glenn began his public career on the California State Board of Agriculture. In 1879, he ran in the California gubernatorial election as the candidate of both the Democratic and the New Constitution parties. He lost to Republican George C. Perkins.

== Death ==
On February 17, 1883, Dr. Glenn was murdered on his ranch at Jacinto by Huram Miller, who worked for him as a bookkeeper. Miller was an alcoholic and Glenn finally struck him, after being verbally abused by the drunken employee. Miller brooded for several days, then shot Glenn in the head from ambush with a load of buckshot. Glenn was survived by his wife and three sons and one daughter. His remains were taken to Oakland for interment.

Peter French continued to manage the Oregon operation for the Glenn family, selling more cattle to help pay the family’s debts. In 1894, Glenn’s heirs decided to incorporate the French-Glenn partnership into the French-Glenn Livestock Company, making French the company president. The land was later sold in small parcels, a great part purchased by the Sacramento Valley Irrigation Company and subdivided in later years.

== Legacy ==
In 1891, Glenn County was created and named in honor of Dr. Glenn, who purchased 8,000 acres (32.4 km^{2}) on the north end of Rancho Jacinto in 1867.

In 1908 more land was reported for sale: "The Glenn Rancho contains 86 square miles, embodying 55,000 acres, occupies a strip five miles wide and sixteen miles long on the west bank of the Sacramento River .... "

Party political offices
Preceded by William Irwin	Democratic nominee for Governor of California; 1879	Succeeded by George Stoneman
