= Hamilton City, California =

Hamilton City
- census-designated place
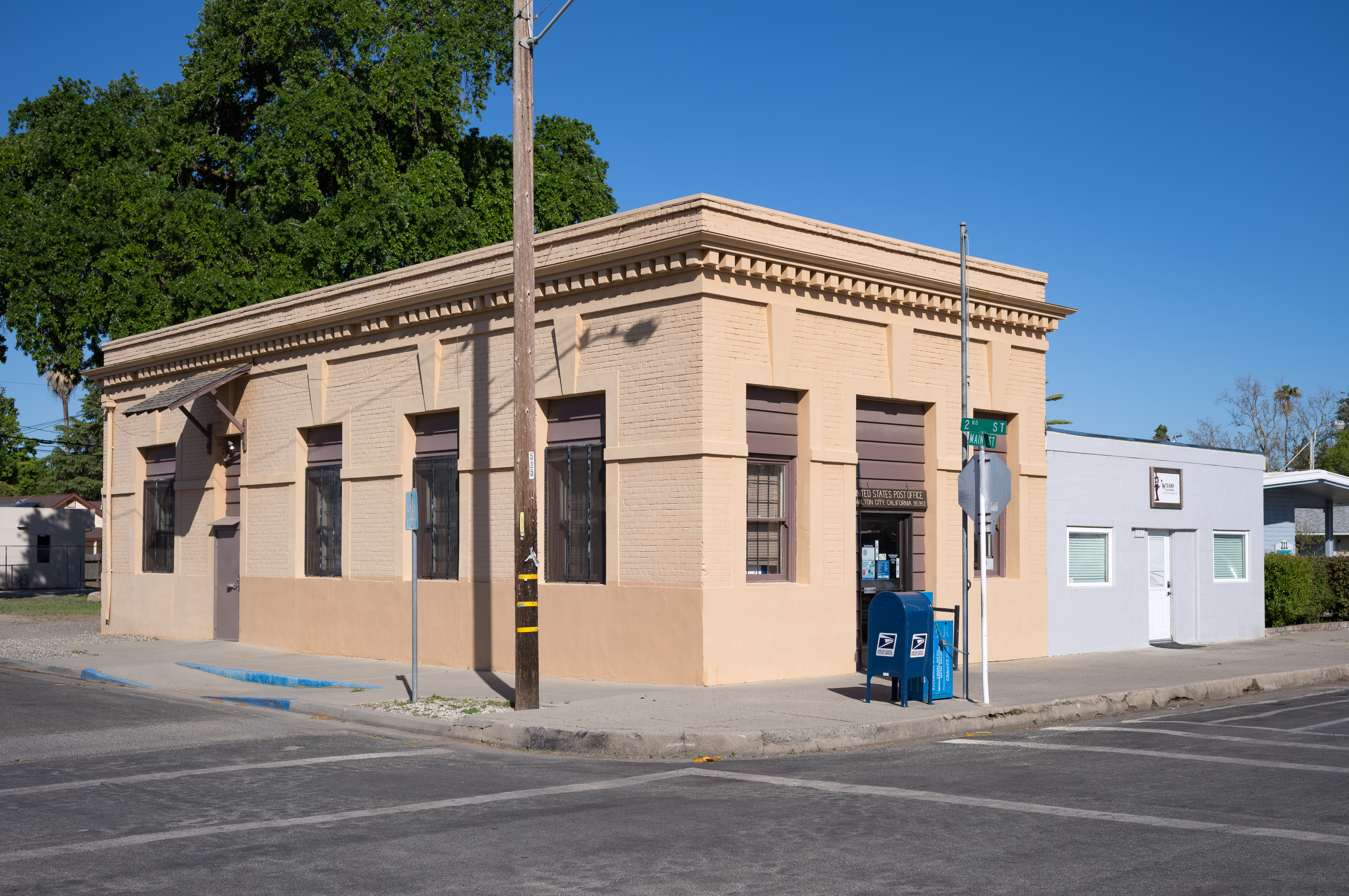
- Hamilton City Post Office

- Location in Glenn County and the state of California

- Location in the United States
- Coordinates: 39°44′34″N 122°00′49″W
- Country: United States
- State: California
- County: Glenn

Area
  - Total: 0.409 sq mi (1.060 km^{2})
  - Land: 0.409 sq mi (1.060 km^{2})
  - Water: 0 sq mi (0 km^{2}) 0%
- Elevation: 151 ft (46 m)

Population (2020)
  - Total: 2,263
  - Density: 5,529/sq mi (2,135/km^{2})
- Time zone: UTC-8 (Pacific (PST))
  - Summer (DST): UTC-7 (PDT)
- ZIP code: 95951
- Area code: 530
- FIPS code: 06-31890
- GNIS feature ID: 1658701

Hamilton City (formerly, Hamilton) is a census-designated place (CDP) in Glenn County, California, United States. The population was 2,263 at the 2020 census, up from 1,759 at the 2010 census. Hamilton City is located 9.5 miles (15 km) east of Orland, and 10 miles west of Chico at an elevation of 151 feet (46 m). The community is inside area code 530. The default prefix used for wired telephones in the Hamilton City area is 826. The postal ZIP Code is 95951.

== Signature features ==
The community is located along the Sacramento River near Mile 199. Hamilton High School is in the community.

The large silos of the former Holly Sugar Plant (formerly served by California Northern Railroad) are visible from all over town.

"Las Palmas" (Palm Drive; a.k.a. County Road 16) is well known to locals and is 2.1 miles (3.4 km) long. It connected Hamilton City to the now-defunct Mills Orchards, which were originally the home of James Mills Sr. and his family.

== Geography ==
According to the United States Census Bureau, the CDP has a total area of 0.4 square miles (1.0 km^{2}), all land.

=== Climate ===
According to the Köppen Climate Classification system, Hamilton City has a warm-summer Mediterranean climate, abbreviated "Csa" on climate maps.

== History ==
The town began in 1905 with the founding of a large sugar beet processing plant, completed the following year by James Hamilton and the Alta California Sugar Beet Company (which changed its name in 1908 to Sacramento Valley Sugar Company). The plant later belonged to Holly Sugar Corporation and is known to this day as the Holly Sugar Plant. Holly Sugar was sold in 1936 to Spreckels Sugar Company and, in turn, Spreckels was later purchased by Imperial Sugar. The sugar plant closed in 2006, and in 2021 was acquired and renovated by Nutrien Company, a fertilizer producer.

The first post office at Hamilton City opened in 1906. As the town's population grew, to make room for development the local cemetery was moved to a new location about 10 miles north of Artois, California.

== Demographics ==
Historical population
Census	Pop.	Note	%±
1980	1,337		—
1990	1,811		35.5%
2000	1,903		5.1%
2010	1,759		−7.6%
2020	2,263		28.7%
U.S. Decennial Census; 1860–1870 1880-1890; 1900 1910 1920; 1930 1940 1950; 1960 1970 1980; 1990 2000 2010; 2020

Hamilton City first appeared as a census designated place in the 1980 United States census.

=== Racial and ethnic composition ===
Hamilton City CDP, California – Racial and ethnic composition Note: the US Census treats Hispanic/Latino as an ethnic category. This table excludes Latinos from the racial categories and assigns them to a separate category. Hispanics/Latinos may be of any race.
Race / Ethnicity (NH = Non-Hispanic)	Pop 2000	Pop 2010	Pop 2020	% 2000	% 2010	% 2020
White alone (NH)	330	221	171	17.34%	12.56%	7.56%
Black or African American alone (NH)	5	10	16	0.26%	0.57%	0.71%
Native American or Alaska Native alone (NH)	10	11	10	0.53%	0.63%	0.44%
Asian alone (NH)	6	15	44	0.32%	0.85%	1.94%
Native Hawaiian or Pacific Islander alone (NH)	0	0	2	0.00%	0.00%	0.09%
Other race alone (NH)	6	0	5	0.32%	0.00%	0.22%
Mixed race or Multiracial (NH)	13	13	25	0.68%	0.74%	1.10%
Hispanic or Latino (any race)	1,533	1,489	1,990	80.56%	84.65%	87.94%
Total	1,903	1,759	2,263	100.00%	100.00%	100.00%

=== 2020 census ===
As of the 2020 census, Hamilton City had a population of 2,263. The population density was 5,533.0 inhabitants per square mile (2,136.3/km^{2}).

The whole population lived in households. There were 674 households, out of which 305 (45.3%) had children under the age of 18 living in them, 357 (53.0%) were married-couple households, 46 (6.8%) were cohabiting couple households, 140 (20.8%) had a female householder with no spouse or partner present, and 131 (19.4%) had a male householder with no spouse or partner present. 104 households (15.4%) were one person, and 41 (6.1%) were one person aged 65 or older. The average household size was 3.36. There were 531 families (78.8% of all households).

The age distribution was 613 people (27.1%) under the age of 18, 235 people (10.4%) aged 18 to 24, 575 people (25.4%) aged 25 to 44, 536 people (23.7%) aged 45 to 64, and 304 people (13.4%) who were 65 years of age or older. The median age was 34.5 years. For every 100 females, there were 109.0 males. For every 100 females age 18 and over, there were 104.7 males age 18 and over.

0.0% of residents lived in urban areas, while 100.0% lived in rural areas.

There were 695 housing units at an average density of 1,699.3 units per square mile (656.1 units/km^{2}), of which 674 (97.0%) were occupied. Of these, 397 (58.9%) were owner-occupied, and 277 (41.1%) were occupied by renters. 3.0% of housing units were vacant. The homeowner vacancy rate was 0.0%, and the rental vacancy rate was 2.5%.

=== Income and poverty ===
In 2023, the US Census Bureau estimated that the median household income was $70,665, and the per capita income was $23,202. About 6.5% of families and 7.5% of the population were below the poverty line.

=== 2010 ===
At the 2010 census Hamilton City had a population of 1,759. The population density was 5,642.8 inhabitants per square mile (2,178.7/km^{2}). The racial makeup of Hamilton City was 834 (47.4%) White, 18 (1.0%) African American, 23 (1.3%) Native American, 15 (0.9%) Asian, 0 (0.0%) Pacific Islander, 804 (45.7%) from other races, and 65 (3.7%) from two or more races. Hispanic or Latino of any race were 1,489 persons (84.7%).

The whole population lived in households, no one lived in non-institutionalized group quarters and no one was institutionalized.

There were 510 households, 269 (52.7%) had children under the age of 18 living in them, 304 (59.6%) were opposite-sex married couples living together, 79 (15.5%) had a female householder with no husband present, 48 (9.4%) had a male householder with no wife present. There were 40 (7.8%) unmarried opposite-sex partnerships, and 5 (1.0%) same-sex married couples or partnerships. 54 households (10.6%) were one person and 24 (4.7%) had someone living alone who was 65 or older. The average household size was 3.45. There were 431 families (84.5% of households); the average family size was 3.66.

The age distribution was 530 people (30.1%) under the age of 18, 203 people (11.5%) aged 18 to 24, 493 people (28.0%) aged 25 to 44, 359 people (20.4%) aged 45 to 64, and 174 people (9.9%) who were 65 or older. The median age was 29.6 years. For every 100 females, there were 103.8 males. For every 100 females age 18 and over, there were 106.6 males.

There were 539 housing units at an average density of 1,729.1 per square mile (667.6/km^{2}), of which 510 were occupied, 289 (56.7%) by the owners and 221 (43.3%) by renters. The homeowner vacancy rate was 2.0%; the rental vacancy rate was 5.1%. 947 people (53.8% of the population) lived in owner-occupied housing units and 812 people (46.2%) lived in rental housing units.

== Politics ==
In the state legislature Hamilton City is in the 1st senatorial district, represented by Republican Megan Dahle, and in the 3rd Assembly district, represented by Vacant.

Federally, Hamilton City is in California's 3rd congressional district, represented by Independent Kevin Kiley.

== Education ==
It is in the Hamilton Unified School District, which operates Hamilton Elementary School and Hamilton High School.

The Hamilton Union High School District and Hamilton Union Elementary School Districts unified in 2009 to become the Hamilton Unified School District. Longtime Hamilton Union High School Principal/Superintendent Ray Odom served as the first Superintendent of the new Hamilton Unified School District. Mr. Odom retired in 2011. The current Superintendent is Jeremy Powell and the current High School Principal is Cris Oseguera. Hamilton Unified School District includes Hamilton High School, Hamilton Elementary School, Ella Barkley High School, Hamilton Adult School, Hamilton High Community Day School, and Hamilton Elementary Community Day School.

== Emergency services ==
Law enforcement is provided by the Glenn County Sheriff's Department.

Fire services are provided by the Hamilton City Fire Protection District which covers the town as well as the surrounding area, including a mutual aid agreement with Butte County Fire, the Capay Volunteer Fire Department and Ord Bend Volunteer Fire Department, eight miles south.

The Fire District consists of a full-time fire chief, a part-time division chief, and volunteer firefighters. Dispatch services for HCFPD are provided by Glenn county sheriffs department.

== Notable people ==
- Kyle Lohse - Major League Baseball (MLB) pitcher for the Milwaukee Brewers; attended Hamilton Union High School.
- Rigoberto Sanchez - National Football League (NFL) punter for the Indianapolis Colts; attended Hamilton Union High School.
