= List of St. Louis Cardinals Opening Day starting pitchers =

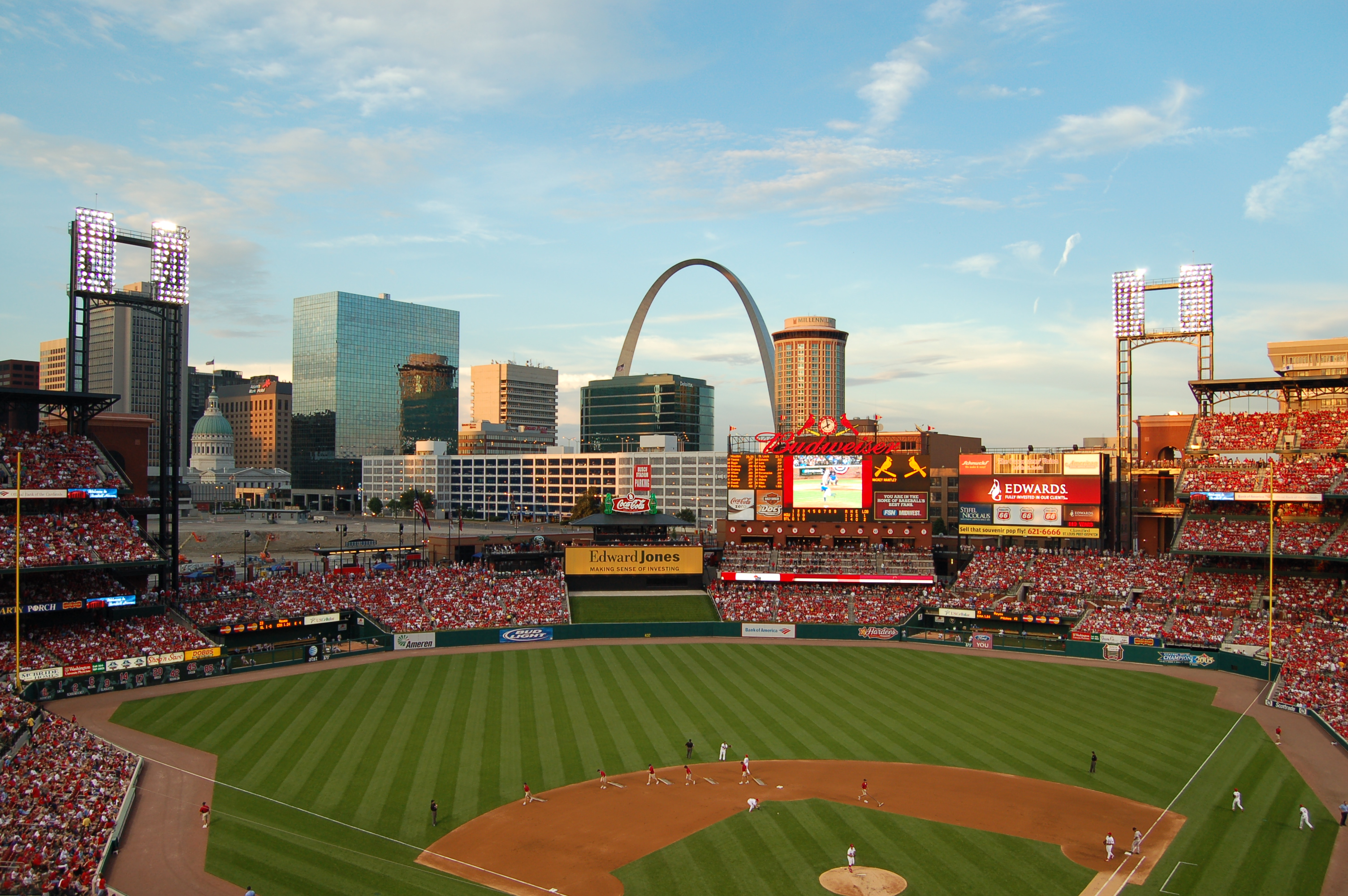
Busch Stadium, St. Louis' home ballpark since 2006

The St. Louis Cardinals are a Major League Baseball (MLB) franchise based in St. Louis, Missouri. They play in the National League Central division. The first game of the new baseball season for a team is played on Opening Day, and being named the Opening Day starter is an honor, which is often given to the player who is expected to lead the pitching staff that season, though there are various strategic reasons why a team's best pitcher might not start on Opening Day. As of 2008, The Cardinals have used 71 different Opening Day starting pitchers in their 128 seasons. Since the franchise's beginning in 1882, the starters have a combined Opening Day record of 70 wins, 57 losses (70–57), and 22 no decisions. No decisions are only awarded to the starting pitcher if the game is won or lost after the starting pitcher has left the game. Although in modern baseball, ties are rare due to extra innings.

Bob Gibson holds the Cardinals record for most Opening Day starts with ten.

== Key ==
| Season | Each year is linked to an article about that particular Cardinals season. |
| W | Win |
| L | Loss |
| T | Tie |
| ND (W) | No decision by starting pitcher; Cardinals won game |
| ND (L) | No decision by starting pitcher; Cardinals lost game |
| Pitcher (#) | Number of appearances as Opening Day starter with the Cardinals |
| (W) | Cardinals won game; no information on starting pitcher's decision |
| (L) | Cardinals lost game; no information on starting pitcher's decision |
| † | AA Champions |
| * | Advanced to the post-season |
| ** | NL Champions |
| *** | World Series Champions |

== Pitchers ==
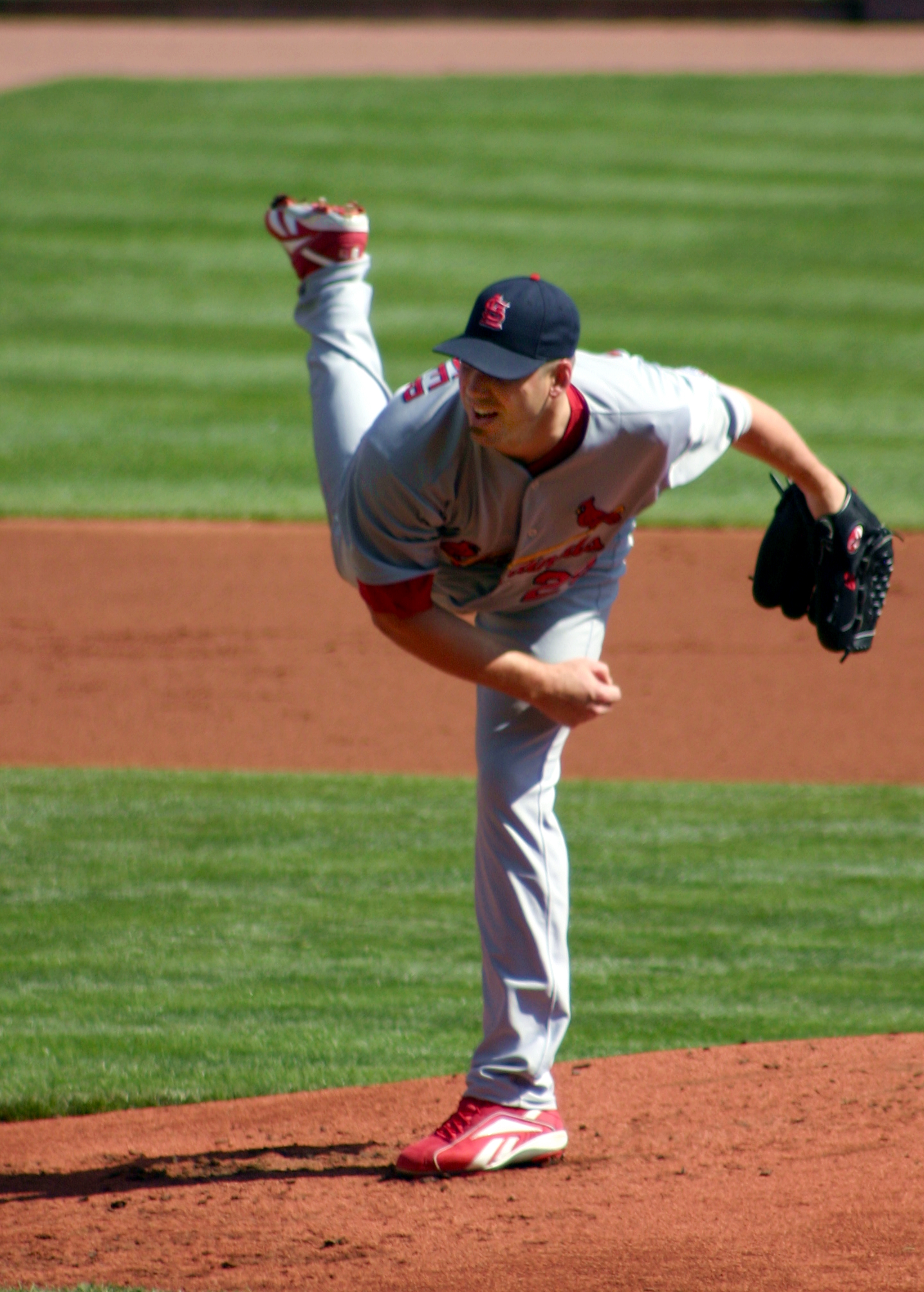
Chris Carpenter, the 2005, 2006, 2007, and 2010 opening day starter

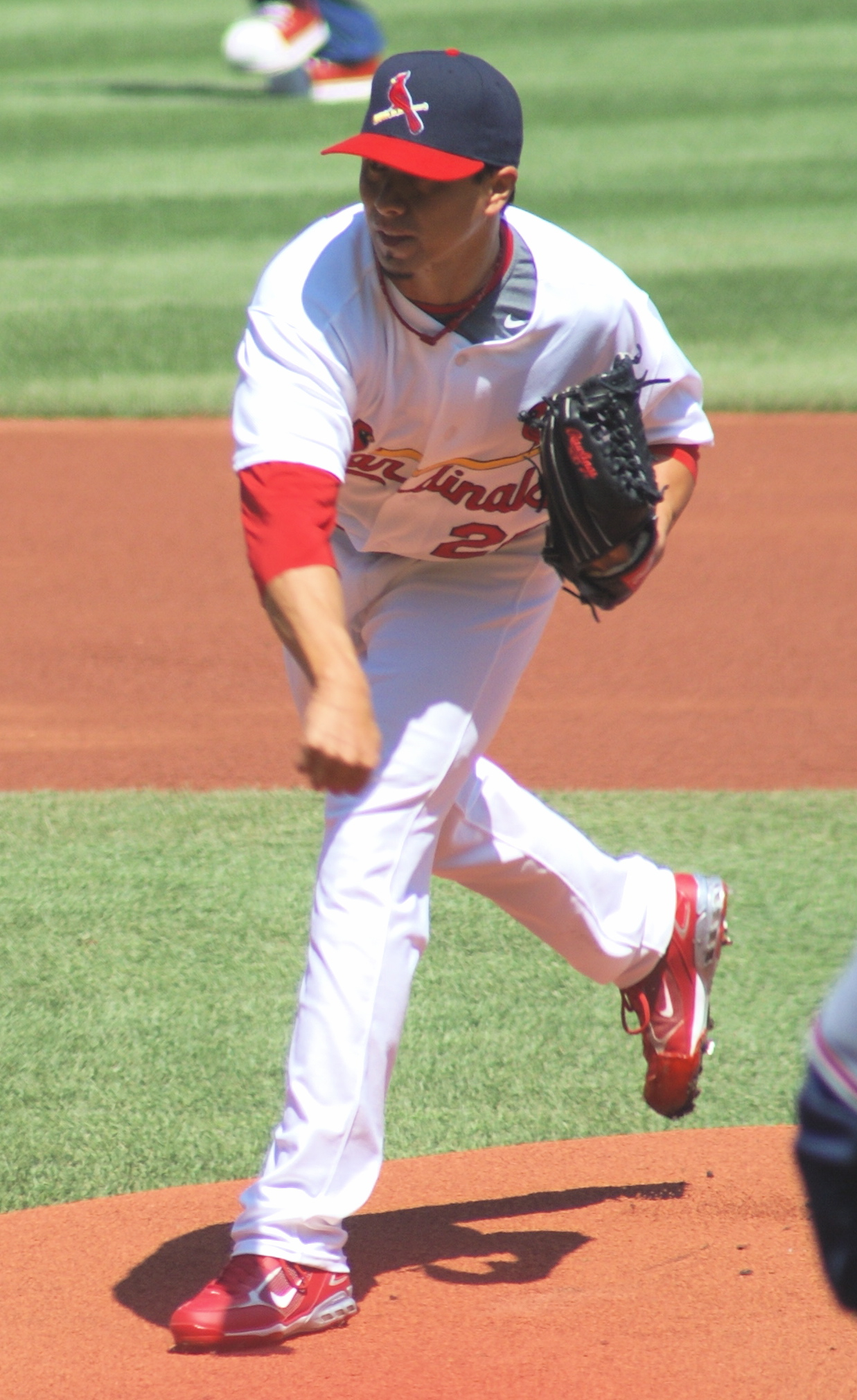
Kyle Lohse, the 2008 and 2012 opening day starter

| Season | Pitcher | Decision | Opponent | Location | Ref(s) |
|---|---|---|---|---|---|
| 1882 | Jumbo McGinnis | (W) | Louisville Eclipse | Sportsman's Park | |
| 1883 | Jumbo McGinnis (2) | (L) | Cincinnati Red Stockings | Bank Street Grounds | |
| 1884 | Tip O'Neill | (W) | Indianapolis Hoosiers | Sportsman's Park | |
| 1885† | Dave Foutz | (L) | Pittsburgh Pirates | Sportsman's Park | |
| 1886† | Bob Caruthers | (W) | Pittsburgh Pirates | Sportsman's Park | |
| 1887† | Dave Foutz (2) | (L) | Louisville Colonels | Eclipse Park | |
| 1888† | Silver King | (W) | Louisville Colonels | Sportsman's Park | |
| 1889 | Silver King (2) | (W) | Cincinnati Reds | League Park (CIN) | |
| 1890 | Toad Ramsey | (W) | Louisville Colonels | Eclipse Park | |
| 1891 | Jack Stivetts | (T) | Cincinnati Kelly's Killers | East End Park | |
| 1892 | Kid Gleason | (L) | Chicago Colts | Sportsman's Park | |
| 1893 | Pink Hawley | (W) | Louisville Colonels | New Sportsman's Park | |
| 1894 | Ted Breitenstein | (W) | Pittsburgh Pirates | New Sportsman's Park | |
| 1895 | Ted Breitenstein (2) | (L) | Chicago Colts | New Sportsman's Park | |
| 1896 | Ted Breitenstein (3) | (W) | Cleveland Spiders | New Sportsman's Park | |
| 1897 | Red Donahue | (L) | Pittsburgh Pirates | New Sportsman's Park | |
| 1898 | Jack B. Taylor | (L) | Chicago Orphans | New Sportsman's Park | |
| 1899 | Cy Young | (W) | Cleveland Spiders | League Park | |
| 1900 | Cy Young (2) | (W) | Pittsburgh Pirates | League Park | |
| 1901 | Jack Powell | (L) | Chicago Orphans | League Park | |
| 1902 | Stan Yerkes | (L) | Pittsburgh Pirates | League Park | |
| 1903 | Clarence Currie | (W) | Chicago Cubs | League Park | |
| 1904 | Jack W. Taylor | (L) | Pittsburgh Pirates | League Park | |
| 1905 | Chappie McFarland | (L) | Chicago Cubs | League Park | |
| 1906 | Jack W. Taylor (2) | (L) | Pittsburgh Pirates | League Park | |
| 1907 | Art Fromme | (L) | Chicago Cubs | West Side Park | |
| 1908 | Johnny Lush | (L) | Pittsburgh Pirates | League Park | |
| 1909 | Johnny Lush (2) | (L) | Chicago Cubs | West Side Park | |
| 1910 | Vic Willis | (L) | Pittsburgh Pirates | League Park | |
| 1911 | Slim Sallee | T | Chicago Cubs | West Side Park | |
| 1912 | Bob Harmon | (W) | Pittsburgh Pirates | Robison Field | |
| 1913 | Dan Griner | (W) | Chicago Cubs | West Side Park | |
| 1914 | Dan Griner (2) | (W) | Pittsburgh Pirates | Robison Field | |
| 1915 | Slim Sallee (2) | (L) | Chicago Cubs | West Side Park | |
| 1916 | Bill Doak | (W) | Pittsburgh Pirates | Robison Field | |
| 1917 | Lee Meadows | (L) | Cincinnati Reds | Redland Field | |
| 1918 | Lee Meadows (2) | (W) | Chicago Cubs | Cardinal Field | |
| 1919 | Jakie May | (L) | Cincinnati Reds | Redland Field | |
| 1920 | Bill Doak (2) | (L) | Pittsburgh Pirates | Cardinal Field | |
| 1921 | Jesse Haines | L | Chicago Cubs | Cubs Park | |
| 1922 | Bill Sherdel | W | Pittsburgh Pirates | Sportsman's Park | |
| 1923 | Jeff Pfeffer | ND (L) | Cincinnati Reds | Redland Field | |
| 1924 | Johnny Stuart | ND (W) | Chicago Cubs | Sportsman's Park | |
| 1925 | Jesse Haines (2) | L | Cincinnati Reds | Redland Field | |
| 1926*** | Flint Rhem | W | Pittsburgh Pirates | Sportsman's Park | |
| 1927 | Grover Cleveland Alexander | (L) | Chicago Cubs | Wrigley Field | |
| 1928** | Jesse Haines (3) | (W) | Pittsburgh Pirates | Sportsman's Park | |
| 1929 | Grover Cleveland Alexander (2) | (W) | Cincinnati Reds | Redland Field | |
| 1930** | Flint Rhem (2) | (L) | Chicago Cubs | Sportsman's Park | |
| 1931*** | Flint Rhem (3) | (W) | Cincinnati Reds | Redland Field | |
| 1932 | Flint Rhem (4) | (W) | Pittsburgh Pirates | Sportsman's Park | |
| 1933 | Dizzy Dean | (L) | Chicago Cubs | Wrigley Field | |
| 1934*** | Dizzy Dean (2) | (W) | Pittsburgh Pirates | Sportsman's Park | |
| 1935 | Dizzy Dean (3) | (L) | Chicago Cubs | Wrigley Field | |
| 1936 | Dizzy Dean (4) | (L) | Chicago Cubs | Sportsman's Park | |
| 1937 | Dizzy Dean (5) | W | Cincinnati Reds | Crosley Field | |
| 1938 | Bob Weiland | (L) | Pittsburgh Pirates | Sportsman's Park | |
| 1939 | Bob Weiland (2) | W | Pittsburgh Pirates | Forbes Field | |
| 1940 | Curt Davis | (L) | Pittsburgh Pirates | Sportsman's Park | |
| 1941 | Lon Warneke | W | Cincinnati Reds | Crosley Field | |
| 1942*** | Mort Cooper | (L) | Chicago Cubs | Sportsman's Park | |
| 1943** | Mort Cooper (2) | (L) | Cincinnati Reds | Crosley Field | |
| 1944*** | Max Lanier | W | Pittsburgh Pirates | Sportsman's Park | |
| 1945 | Ted Wilks | (L) | Chicago Cubs | Wrigley Field | |
| 1946*** | Johnny Beazley | (L) | Pittsburgh Pirates | Sportsman's Park | |
| 1947 | Howie Pollet | (L) | Cincinnati Reds | Crosley Field | |
| 1948 | Murry Dickson | W | Cincinnati Reds | Sportsman's Park | |
| 1949 | Harry Brecheen | (L) | Cincinnati Reds | Crosley Field | |
| 1950 | Gerry Staley | W | Pittsburgh Pirates | Sportsman's Park | |
| 1951 | Tom Poholsky | (L) | Pittsburgh Pirates | Forbes Field | |
| 1952 | Gerry Staley (2) | W | Pittsburgh Pirates | Sportsman's Park | |
| 1953 | Gerry Staley (3) | L | Milwaukee Braves | Milwaukee County Stadium | |
| 1954 | Harvey Haddix | L | Chicago Cubs | Busch Stadium | |
| 1955 | Brooks Lawrence | L | Chicago Cubs | Wrigley Field | |
| 1956 | Wilmer Mizell | W | Cincinnati Reds | Crosley Field | |
| 1957 | Herm Wehmeier | W | Cincinnati Reds | Crosley Field | |
| 1958 | Wilmer Mizell (2) | L | Chicago Cubs | Sportsman's Park | |
| 1959 | Larry Jackson | ND (L) | San Francisco Giants | Sportsman's Park | |
| 1960 | Larry Jackson (2) | L | San Francisco Giants | Candlestick Park | |
| 1961 | Ernie Broglio | ND (W) | Milwaukee Braves | Milwaukee County Stadium | |
| 1962 | Larry Jackson (3) | W | New York Mets | Sportsman's Park | |
| 1963 | Ernie Broglio (2) | W | New York Mets | Polo Grounds | |
| 1964*** | Ernie Broglio (3) | L | Los Angeles Dodgers | Dodger Stadium | |
| 1965 | Bob Gibson | T | Chicago Cubs | Wrigley Field | |
| 1966 | Curt Simmons | ND (L) | Philadelphia Phillies | Sportsman's Park | |
| 1967*** | Bob Gibson (2) | W | San Francisco Giants | Busch Memorial Stadium | |
| 1968** | Bob Gibson (3) | ND (W) | Atlanta Braves | Busch Memorial Stadium | |
| 1969 | Bob Gibson (4) | ND (L) | Pittsburgh Pirates | Busch Memorial Stadium | |
| 1970 | Bob Gibson (5) | W | Montreal Expos | Jarry Park Stadium | |
| 1971 | Bob Gibson (6) | L | Chicago Cubs | Wrigley Field | |
| 1972 | Bob Gibson (7) | ND (L) | Montreal Expos | Busch Memorial Stadium | |
| 1973 | Bob Gibson (8) | ND (L) | Pittsburgh Pirates | Three Rivers Stadium | |
| 1974 | Bob Gibson (9) | ND (W) | Pittsburgh Pirates | Busch Memorial Stadium | |
| 1975 | Bob Gibson (10) | L | Montreal Expos | Busch Memorial Stadium | |
| 1976 | Lynn McGlothen | W | Chicago Cubs | Busch Memorial Stadium | |
| 1977 | John Denny | W | Pittsburgh Pirates | Three Rivers Stadium | |
| 1978 | Bob Forsch | W | Philadelphia Phillies | Veterans Stadium | |
| 1979 | John Denny (2) | W | Philadelphia Phillies | Busch Memorial Stadium | |
| 1980 | Pete Vuckovich | W | Pittsburgh Pirates | Busch Memorial Stadium | |
| 1981 | Bob Forsch (2) | L | Philadelphia Phillies | Busch Memorial Stadium | |
| 1982*** | Bob Forsch (3) | W | Houston Astros | Houston Astrodome | |
| 1983 | Bob Forsch (4) | L | Pittsburgh Pirates | Busch Memorial Stadium | |
| 1984 | Dave LaPoint | L | Los Angeles Dodgers | Dodger Stadium | |
| 1985** | Joaquín Andújar | ND (L) | New York Mets | Shea Stadium | |
| 1986 | John Tudor | W | Chicago Cubs | Busch Memorial Stadium | |
| 1987** | John Tudor (2) | W | Chicago Cubs | Wrigley Field | |
| 1988* | Joe Magrane | ND (L) | Cincinnati Reds | Riverfront Stadium | |
| 1989 | Joe Magrane (2) | L | New York Mets | Shea Stadium | |
| 1990 | Joe Magrane (3) | ND (W) | Montreal Expos | Busch Memorial Stadium | |
| 1991 | Bryn Smith | W | Chicago Cubs | Wrigley Field | |
| 1992 | José DeLeón | ND (L) | New York Mets | Busch Memorial Stadium | |
| 1993 | Bob Tewksbury | L | San Francisco Giants | Busch Memorial Stadium | |
| 1994 | Bob Tewksbury (2) | W | Cincinnati Reds | Riverfront Stadium | |
| 1995 | Ken Hill | ND (W) | Philadelphia Phillies | Busch Memorial Stadium | |
| 1996* | Andy Benes | ND (L) | New York Mets | Shea Stadium | |
| 1997 | Todd Stottlemyre | ND (L) | Montreal Expos | Olympic Stadium | |
| 1998 | Todd Stottlemyre (2) | W | Los Angeles Dodgers | Busch Memorial Stadium | |
| 1999 | Donovan Osborne | ND (L) | Milwaukee Brewers | Busch Memorial Stadium | |
| 2000* | Darryl Kile | W | Chicago Cubs | Busch Memorial Stadium | |
| 2001* | Darryl Kile (2) | L | Colorado Rockies | Coors Field | |
| 2002* | Matt Morris | W | Colorado Rockies | Busch Memorial Stadium | |
| 2003 | Matt Morris (2) | ND (W) | Milwaukee Brewers | Busch Memorial Stadium | |
| 2004** | Matt Morris (3) | ND (L) | Milwaukee Brewers | Busch Memorial Stadium | |
| 2005* | Chris Carpenter | W | Houston Astros | Minute Maid Park | |
| 2006*** | Chris Carpenter (2) | W | Philadelphia Phillies | Citizens Bank Park | |
| 2007 | Chris Carpenter (3) | L | New York Mets | Busch Stadium | |
| 2008 | Kyle Lohse | ND (L) | Colorado Rockies | Busch Stadium | |
| 2009* | Adam Wainwright | ND (L) | Pittsburgh Pirates | Busch Stadium | |
| 2010 | Chris Carpenter (4) | W | Cincinnati Reds | Great American Ball Park | |
| 2011*** | Chris Carpenter (5) | ND (L) | San Diego Padres | Busch Stadium | |
| 2012* | Kyle Lohse (2) | W | Miami Marlins | Marlins Park | |
| 2013** | Adam Wainwright (2) | L | Arizona Diamondbacks | Chase Field | |
| 2014* | Adam Wainwright (3) | W | Cincinnati Reds | Great American Ball Park | |
| 2015* | Adam Wainwright (4) | W | Chicago Cubs | Wrigley Field | |
| 2016 | Adam Wainwright (5) | L | Pittsburgh Pirates | PNC Park | |
| 2017 | Carlos Martínez | ND (W) | Chicago Cubs | Busch Stadium | |
| 2018 | Carlos Martínez (2) | L | New York Mets | Citi Field | |
| 2019* | Miles Mikolas | L | Milwaukee Brewers | Miller Park | |
| 2020* | Jack Flaherty | W | Pittsburgh Pirates | Busch Stadium | |
| 2021* | Jack Flaherty (2) | ND (W) | Cincinnati Reds | Great American Ballpark | |
| 2022* | Adam Wainwright (6) | W | Pittsburgh Pirates | Busch Stadium | |
| 2023 | Miles Mikolas (2) | ND (L) | Toronto Blue Jays | Busch Stadium | |
| 2024 | Miles Mikolas (3) | L | Los Angeles Dodgers | Dodger Stadium | |
| 2025 | Sonny Gray | W | Minnesota Twins | Busch Stadium | |
| 2026 | Matthew Liberatore | ND (W) | Tampa Bay Rays | Busch Stadium | |
