= Rancho Farwell =

Mexican land grant

Coordinates: 39.600°N 121.900°W

Rancho Farwell was a 22,194-acre (89.82 km^{2}) Mexican land grant in present-day Butte County, California given in 1844 by Governor Manuel Micheltorena to Edward A. Farwell. The grant was located east of the Sacramento River along the south bank of Chico Creek and encompassed part of present-day Chico.

== History ==
Edward Augustus Farwell (1814–1845), born in Maine, came to California in 1842. In 1843 he became a Mexican citizen, and the next year obtained the five-square-league Rancho Farwell grant. In 1845 Farwell sold the north half of the grant to brothers James and John S. Williams. John S. Williams (–1849) worked for Thomas O. Larkin on Rancho Larkin’s Children.

In 1845, Farwell died having neither wife nor children, but a mother, four brothers, and one sister in Maine. At the time of his death, Edward A. Farwell was indebted to John Bidwell. Bidwell claimed authority to settle the estate of Farwell and, in 1849, sold the southern half of the grant to John Potter.

With the cession of California to the United States following the Mexican-American War, the 1848 Treaty of Guadalupe Hidalgo provided that the land grants would be honored. As required by the Land Act of 1851, James Williams and the heirs of John S. Williams (Maria Louisa Carson, widow, and John Shelby Williams, Jr., son), and the heirs of John Potter filed a claim for Rancho Farwell with the Public Land Commission in 1853. The Commission and the District Court confirmed the grant to the Williams and the heirs of Edward A. Farwell, but not to the heirs of J. Potter. The grant was patented to the Williams heirs and the heirs of Edward A. Farwell in 1863.

In 1860, heirs of Edward A. Farwell from Maine started litigation to recover the southern half of the grant that was then occupied by Henry Gerke of Rancho Bosquejo. In 1875, the 1849 sale of the southern half of the grant to John Potter was declared by the court to be void.
