= Rigoberto Sanchez =

American football player (born 1994)

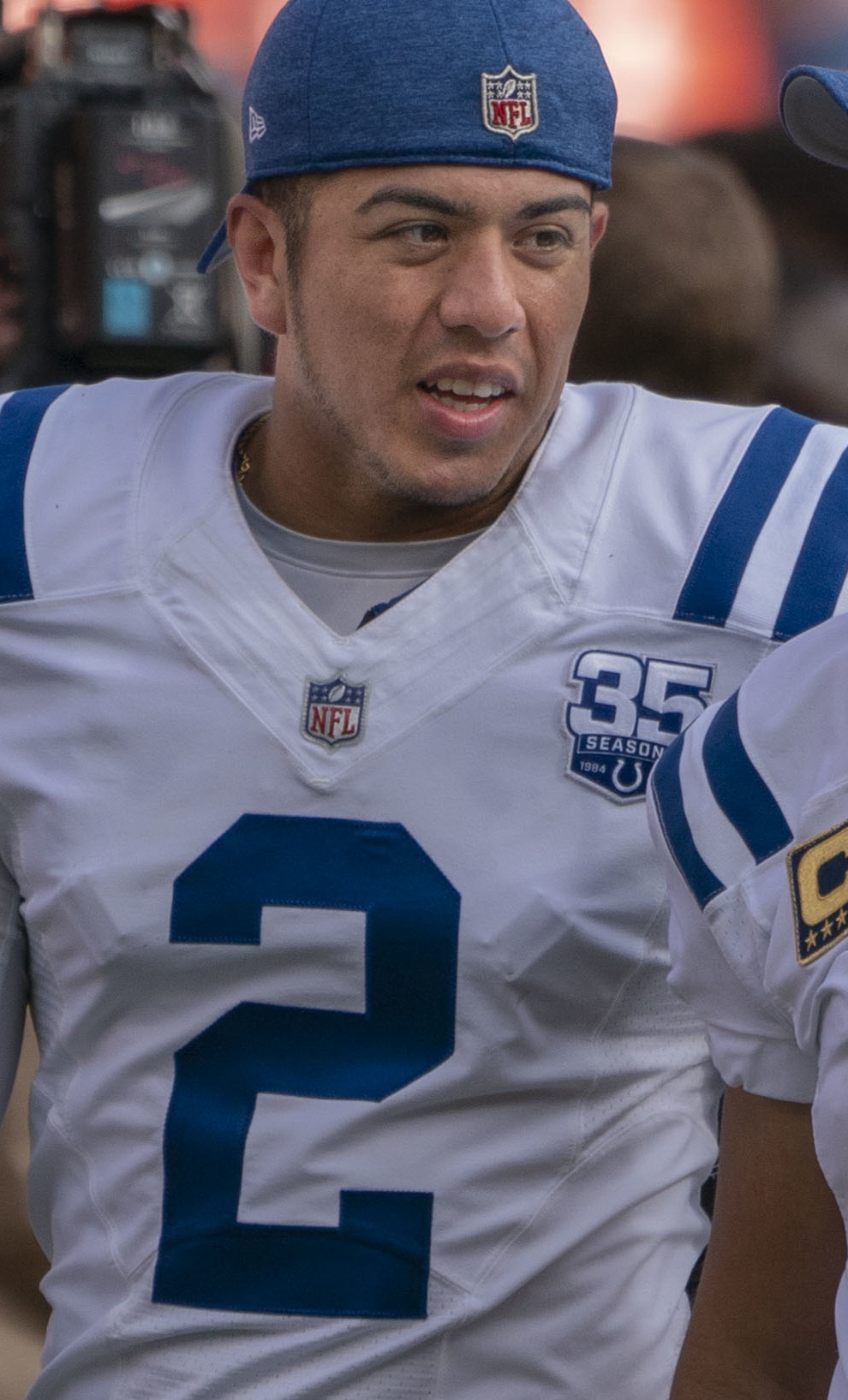
- Sanchez with the Indianapolis Colts in 2018

No. 8 – Indianapolis Colts
- Position: Punter
- Roster status: Active

Personal information
- Born: September 8, 1994 (age 32); Chico, California, U.S.
- Listed height: 6 ft 0 in (1.83 m)
- Listed weight: 195 lb (88 kg)

Career information
- High school: Hamilton Union (Hamilton City, California)
- College: Butte (2012–2013); Hawaii (2015–2016)
- NFL draft: 2017: undrafted

Career history
- Indianapolis Colts (2017–present)

Awards and highlights
- PFWA All-Rookie Team (2017)

Career NFL statistics as of Week 8, 2026
- Punts: 505
- Punting yards: 23,586
- Punting average: 46.7
- Longest punt: 79
- Inside 20: 195
- Touchbacks: 270
- Stats at Pro Football Reference

Rigoberto Jovany Sanchez (born September 8, 1994) is an American professional football punter and kickoff specialist for the Indianapolis Colts of the National Football League (NFL). He played college football for the Hawaii Rainbow Warriors and was signed by the Colts as an undrafted free agent in 2017.

== Early life ==
Sanchez attended and played high school football at Hamilton Union High School in Hamilton City, California.

== College career ==
Sanchez initially played football for Butte College in Oroville, California, located roughly 30 miles southeast of Hamilton City before transferring to the University of Hawaii. While at Hawaii, Sanchez played on the Hawaii Rainbow Warriors for the 2015 and 2016 seasons. During the 2015 season, he punted 74 times for 3,335 net yards for a 45.1 average. He handled placekicking duties and converted 23 of 24 extra point attempts and 8 of 11 field goal attempts. In 2016, he punted 70 times for 3,122 net yards for a 44.6 average. He converted 49 of 50 extra point attempts and all 13 field goal attempts.

=== College statistics ===
Year	School	Conf	Class	Pos	G	Punts	Yds	Avg	XPM	XPA	XP%	FGM	FGA	FG%	Pts
2015	Hawaii	MWC	JR	K	12	74	3,335	45.1	23	24	95.8	8	11	72.7	47
2016	Hawaii	MWC	SR	PK	14	70	3,122	44.6	49	50	98.0	13	13	100.0	88
Career	Hawaii				26	144	6,457	44.8	72	74	97.3	21	24	87.5	135

== Professional career ==
Pre-draft measurables
Height	Weight	Arm length	Hand span	Wingspan
5 ft 11 7/8 in (1.83 m)	193 lb (88 kg)	31 in (0.79 m)	8 1/4 in (0.21 m)	6 ft 2 in (1.88 m)
All values from Pro Day

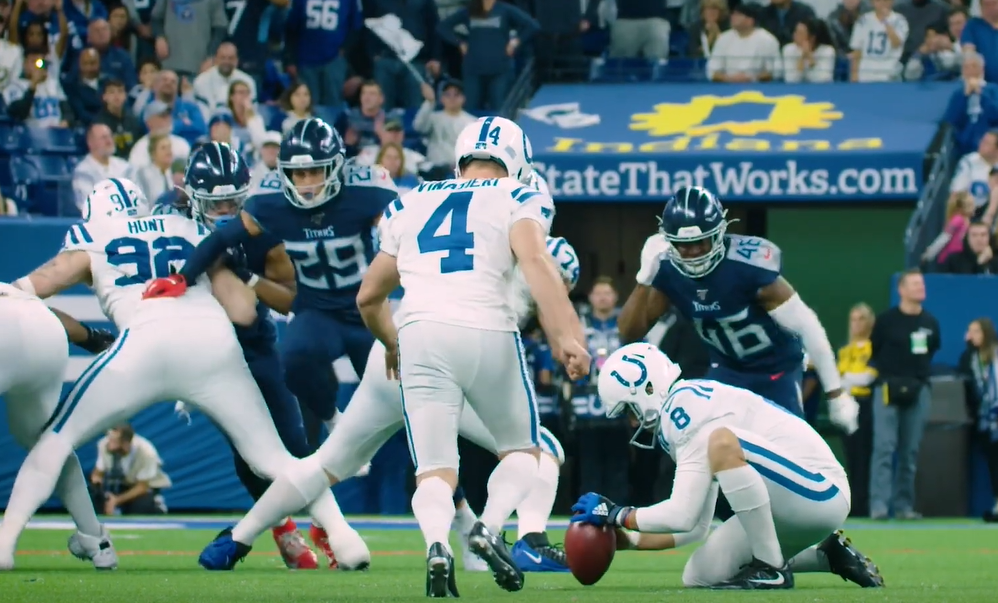
Sanchez (#8) holding the ball for kicker Adam Vinatieri in a game against the Tennessee Titans in 2019

Sanchez was signed by the Indianapolis Colts as an undrafted free agent on May 4, 2017. He won the Colts' starting punter job as a rookie after beating out veteran Jeff Locke.

On September 10, 2017, Sanchez made his NFL debut in the season opener against the Los Angeles Rams at the Los Angeles Memorial Coliseum. During the 46–9 loss, he punted six times for 302 total yards for a 50.3 average. Sanchez finished his rookie year with 84 punts for 3,764 net yards for a 44.81 average. He was named to the PFWA All-Rookie Team.

In the 2018 season, Sanchez had 57 punts for 2,629 net yards for a 46.12 average.

On June 4, 2019, Sanchez signed a four-year, $11.6 million contract extension with the Colts through the 2023 season. In the 2019 season, he had 59 punts with a 44.39 average.

In the 2020 season, Sanchez had 42 punts for a 46.19 average.

In Week 4 of the 2021 season, Sanchez averaged 50 yards per punt on four punts, including two inside the 20, in a 27–17 victory over the Miami Dolphins, earning AFC Special Teams Player of the Week honors. Three weeks later, Sanchez kicked the longest punt of his career, and in franchise history, 79 yards, in a 30–18 road victory over the San Francisco 49ers. He earned AFC Special Teams Player of the Week for his performance. Sanchez had 59 punts for a 44.53 average in the 2021 season.

On August 31, 2022, Sanchez was placed on season-ending injured reserve after suffering a torn Achilles.

In the 2023 season, Sanchez punted 68 times for 3,281 total yards for a 48.25 average.

On March 12, 2024, the Colts signed Sanchez to a three-year, $7.5 million contract extension. During Week 6, Sanchez punted five times, three inside the 20-yard line and two inside the 10-yard line in a 20–17 win over the Titans, earning AFC Special Teams Player of the Week honors. He finished the 2024 season with 68 punts for 3,382 yards for a 49.7 average. He finished the 2025 season with 44 punts for 2,146 yards for a 48.8 average.

On August 27, 2026, Sanchez signed a two-year contract extension with the Colts.

== Career statistics ==
Legend
**Bold**	Career high

=== Regular season ===
Year	Team	GP	Punting							
Year	Team	GP	Punts	Yds	Lng	Avg	RetY	Net Avg	Blk	Ins20
2017	IND	16	**84**	**3,764**	61	44.8	80	42.6	**1**	**28**
2018	IND	16	57	2,629	63	46.1	93	42.7	0	24
2019	IND	16	59	2,619	60	44.4	166	41.2	0	22
2020	IND	14	42	1,940	60	46.2	141	40.0	**1**	18
2021	IND	**17**	59	2,627	**79**	44.5	267	39.7	0	24
2022	IND	0	Did not play due to injury							
2023	IND	**17**	68	3,281	69	48.3	360	43.0	0	21
2024	IND	**17**	68	3,382	65	**49.7**	**406**	42.6	0	27
2025	IND	**17**	44	2,146	59	48.8	120	**44.7**	0	22
2026	IND	5	13	672	59	51.7	66	46.6	0	6
Career		135	494	23,060	79	46.7	1,699	42.2	2	192

=== Postseason ===
Year	Team	GP	Punting					
Year	Team	GP	Punts	Yds	Lng	Avg	Blk	Ins20
2018	IND	**2**	**11**	**486**	**57**	**44.2**	0	0
2020	IND	1	2	73	37	36.5	0	0
Career		3	13	559	57	49.6	0	0

=== Colts franchise records ===
- Longest punt in a game: 79 yards (Week 7, 2021, vs. San Francisco 49ers)

== Personal life ==
Sanchez grew up playing soccer before joining his high school's football team. He is of Mexican descent.

Rigoberto met his wife, Cynthia, when they attended junior college together. She grew up in the nearby community of Corning, CA. After receiving blessings from her family, Sanchez proposed to Cynthia at the Circle of Lights at Monument Circle in downtown Indianapolis on December 26, 2017. They got married the following spring.

On November 30, 2020, it was announced Sanchez would undergo surgery the next day to have a cancerous tumor removed. The surgery was reported as successful and he returned to practice two weeks later.
