= Carlos Martínez (pitcher, born 1991) =

Dominican baseball player (born 1991)

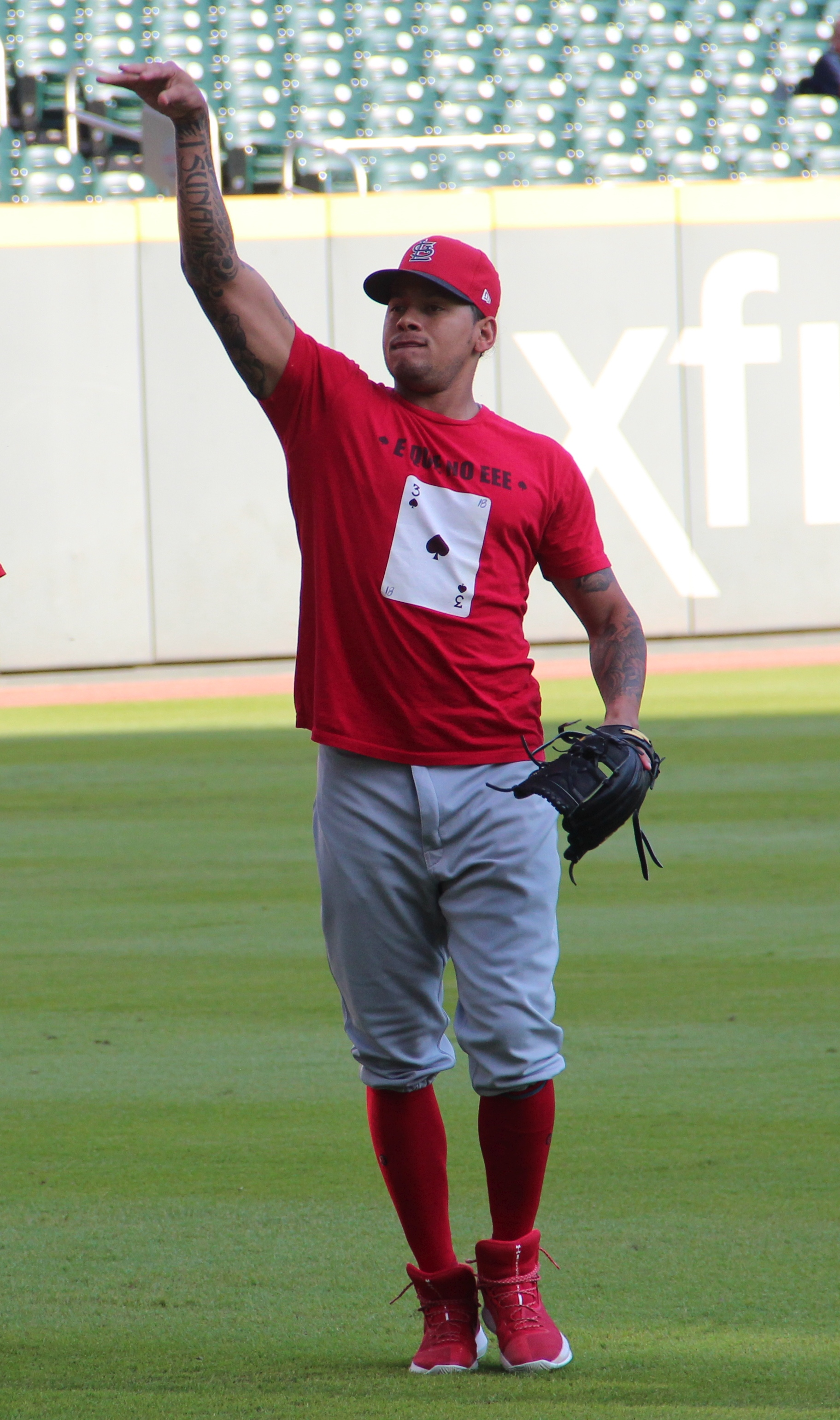
- Martínez with the St. Louis Cardinals in 2018
- Pitcher
- Born: September 21, 1991 (age 35); Puerto Plata, Dominican Republic
- Batted: Right Threw: Right

MLB debut
- May 3, 2013, for the St. Louis Cardinals

Last MLB appearance
- July 4, 2021, for the St. Louis Cardinals

MLB statistics
- Win–loss record: 62–52
- Earned run average: 3.74
- Strikeouts: 927
- Stats at Baseball Reference

Teams
- St. Louis Cardinals (2013–2021)

Career highlights and awards
- 2× All-Star (2015, 2017)

Carlos Ernesto Martínez (born September 21, 1991), nicknamed "Tsunami", is a Dominican former professional baseball pitcher. He played in Major League Baseball (MLB) for the St. Louis Cardinals. Originally signed by the Boston Red Sox as an international free agent in 2009, MLB voided his contract due to discrepancies over his name and date of birth after the revelation that he was also known as Carlos Matias. However, he was eventually cleared of wrongdoing, as it was found that the inconsistencies arose from poor record keeping.

The Cardinals signed Martínez in 2010, and he became a consensus top-100 prospect within Minor League Baseball and one of the Cardinals' highest-rated prospects. A starter in the minor leagues, he made his MLB debut in 2013 and performed mainly in relief roles in his first two seasons in the major leagues, then earned a spot in the Cardinal's rotation in 2015. During his first MLB season, fans gave him the nickname "Little Pedro," due to the similarities in physique and pitching mechanics to former Cy Young Award winner Pedro Martínez.

Martínez pitched with the Cardinals through 2021. MLB suspended him twice in 2022, first for violating the minor league's performance enhancing drug policy, then later for violating the domestic violence policy. After serving those suspensions, Martínez began pitching in the Mexican League.

== Early life, name, and visa issues ==
Carlos Martínez was born in Puerto Plata, Dominican Republic, in a rural zone called Colinas del Sur, where official record-keeping is sometimes poor. Following the death of his mother when he was quite young, Martínez was adopted by an uncle with the last name Matias. The young Martínez originally had plans to become a priest but changed his mind soon after starting to catch the attention of major league scouts. Raised with his uncle's last name, some confusion eventually ensued when he attempted to secure a work visa to pitch in the United States.

When the Boston Red Sox first discovered Martínez, he was a 17-year-old who threw about 90 miles per hour (140 km/h), topping out at 92 miles per hour (148 km/h), with a loose delivery and athletic frame and also sported a quality breaking pitch and changeup. Projections were made that his body would fill out, and thus, increase the velocity and movement of his pitches, including a fastball up to 95 miles per hour (153 km/h). The team considered him comparable to first-round talent available in the Major League Baseball draft. Thus, the Red Sox moved to sign him while he was still relatively unknown, in part to get him for the lowest price possible. He signed for $140,000; however, a routine background check by Major League Baseball (MLB) officials raised several questions about the veracity of both his name and his date of birth. As a result, the Red Sox deal was voided, and, in March 2009, MLB suspended Martínez for one year.

Craig Shipley, the Red Sox executive in charge of international signing, remained adamant that the Red Sox no longer pursue Martínez. While the visa issues became more public, other teams scouted him and quietly lined up to bid for his services. Martínez started to live up to the Red Sox's projections, such as throwing a fastball about 95 mph as well as a power curveball. In time, Martínez's name and date of birth discrepancies were not considered to be significant issues.

== Baseball career ==
=== St. Louis Cardinals ===
==== Minor leagues ====
Once the MLB suspension expired, Martínez signed with the St. Louis Cardinals as an international free agent in 2010 and received a reported $1.5 million signing bonus. While sorting out other visa issues, he pitched in the Dominican Summer League (DSL), where he started 12 games and completed 59 innings pitched (IP). He topped all Cardinals minor leaguers with a 0.76 earned run average (ERA), a .144 batting average against (BAA) and 0.71 walks plus hits per inning pitched (WHIP) and ranked second with 11.9 strikeouts per nine innings pitched (K/9), third with a 5.57 strikeout-to-walk ratio (K/BB), and the fourth toughest to hit a home run against (0.228 HR/9). He led the league in ERA, BAA, K/9, and WHIP (tied for first).

After impressing Cardinal team officials at a minor league mini-camp in February, 2011, he bypassed some of the lower level assignments typical to rookies and was assigned to the Quad Cities River Bandits of the Single-A Midwest League in 2011. He split the season between Quad Cities and the Palm Beach Cardinals, posting a combined won–loss record (W–L) of 6–5 over 18 games and 84 2/3 IP. He also participated in the 2011 All-Star Futures Game.

Returning to Palm Beach to commence the 2012 season, shoulder tendonitis began to bother him after just seven starts and the Cardinals placed him on the disabled list (DL). Despite being on the DL he was advanced to Double-A in late May with the Springfield Cardinals of the Texas League. After returning from the shoulder problems, Martínez posted a 4–3 record over 71 innings. He had 58 strikeouts and ended the season with a 2.90 ERA.

Work visa issues again became a problem prior to 2013 spring training. Unable to secure the proper documents due to lingering confusion as a result of his name change when originally signing with the Cardinals, Martínez sat out nearly all of the 2013 Cardinals major league spring training.

Cleared in late March, Martínez reported to Cardinals minor league spring training more than six weeks behind schedule, in time only for the last few days of camp and requiring an extended spring in Jupiter, Florida. While awaiting the visa in the Dominican Republic, Martínez built up his readiness in a throwing program. After the extended spring, he was reassigned with the Springfield Cardinals. He made just three starts there before the Cardinals called him up. Martínez sported a 2.31 ERA in 11 2/3 innings with nine strikeouts.

==== Beginning career (2013–2014) ====
The Cardinals called up Martínez to the Major League club, the number-three prospect in their organization, on May 3, 2013. He made his major league debut against the Milwaukee Brewers at Miller Park that night. In one inning pitched, the seventh, he gave up a single, then induced a double play he started on a ground ball hit back to him, and then secured the third out with another ground ball. On May 27, the Cardinals sent Martínez down to Triple-A Memphis after seven appearances on the mound and eight innings in which he posted a 4.50 ERA with nine strikeouts. With the Redbirds in 2013, he made 13 starts. In 68 IP, he allowed a 2.51 ERA with 54 hits, three home runs (HR), 27 bases on balls (BB), while striking out 63.

The Cardinals recalled Martínez on August 8 after stretching out his innings workload with Memphis to bring his endurance back to being sufficient to handle the rigors of starting pitching. The next night, Martínez made his first major league start against the Los Angeles Dodgers, pitching five innings and giving up four earned runs. He earned the distinction of being the first Cardinals starter in recent memory to throw over 100 miles per hour (160 km/h) and regularly threw 96–98 miles per hour (154–158 km/h). On September 20, 2013, Martínez entered a game in the tenth against the Brewers in which the Cardinals led 7–6 and closed the game in a 1–2–3 inning. His inning helped make the Cardinals victorious and gave him his first major league save. In the 2013 regular season with the Cardinals, Martínez posted a 5.08 ERA in 28 1/3 innings, striking out 24. He made one start, earned one save, winning two games while losing one.

The Cardinals played him in the 2013 National League Division Series (NLDS) against the Pittsburgh Pirates, where he made three total appearances, giving up two runs in two IP. Against the Dodgers in the National League Championship Series (NLCS), he appeared in four games, giving up no runs while allowing just one hit, one walk, and striking out four in 4 2/3 IP. In the World Series against the Red Sox, he appeared in five games, pitched six innings, giving up five hits, three runs and one walk while striking out five. The Red Sox defeated the Cardinals 4–2 in that World Series. Between the three series, he appeared in 12 games, posted a 3.55 ERA, held opponents to a .167 BAA, and allowed three walks with 11 strikeouts in 12 2/3 IP.

With the fifth starting spot in the rotation open in spring training for the 2014 campaign, Martínez started the season in the bullpen of the Major League Cardinals. Injury struck the rotation in June, and he made his first two starts of the year as spot starts. He made his third major league start and won his first on June 22, pitching five innings and yielding three earned runs in a 5–3 victory over the Philadelphia Phillies. In a July 3 start against the San Francisco Giants, he reached a breakthrough as a starter. In five innings, he allowed just one run on five hits, one walk and struck out six. At the plate, he collected a two-run batted in double as the Cardinals won 7–2, and Martínez collected his second win of the season. He finished the 2014 regular season with a 4.03 ERA and 2–4 W–L in 57 games including seven starts. In December, Martínez changed his uniform number from 44 to 18 to commemorate his friend and teammate, Oscar Taveras, who had died in a car accident two weeks after the 2014 NLCS.

==== First season in the starting rotation (2015) ====
For the first time in his career in 2015, Martínez made the Cardinals starting rotation, earning the fifth starter spot out of spring training. In his first four starts of the season, his ERA was 1.89. However, in consecutive starts against the Chicago Cubs on May 4 and the Pirates on May 9, he allowed 14 runs on 16 hits and 11 walks in two starts covering nine innings. His ERA jumped to 4.73 after those two starts.

In the May 31 contest against the Dodgers, the Cardinals paid an official tribute to Taveras, who had debuted in the major leagues exactly one year earlier. The starting pitcher for the Cardinals, Martínez picked up the win, struck out eight, and extended his scoreless inning streak to 20 1/3 innings in a 3–1 outcome. It was the longest scoreless-inning streak in the National League (NL) for a starting pitcher through that point in the season. Martínez' next start, also against the Dodgers, came on June 5. Over seven innings, he gave up just one run on three hits and struck out 11, a new career high, in a 2–1 victory. The scoreless inning streak stopped at 21 2/3, also a career-high.

Nominated as a contender for the All-Star Final Vote on July 6, Martínez won the fan vote four days later, securing his first MLB All-Star selection for the game at Great American Ball Park in Cincinnati. Through that point in the season, he completed 107 1/3 innings and notched a 10–3 record with a 2.52 ERA. On July 25 against the Atlanta Braves, he pitched his 11th consecutive quality start, tying him with Clayton Kershaw of the Los Angeles Dodgers for longest current streak, and the longest for the Cardinals since Chris Carpenter in 2010.

The quality start streak ended on July 30 in a contest of angry exchanges with the Colorado Rockies. Martínez allowed five runs in five innings and hit DJ LeMahieu with a pitch in the fifth inning. When the inning ended, Martínez flashed an obscene gesture on full public display toward the visitors' dugout with Rockies players and personnel. Corresponding aggressive verbal exchanges ensued, including those between Cardinals catcher Yadier Molina and Rockies third baseman Nolan Arenado; no brawls started. The umpires issued warnings but no ejections followed. The Cardinals eventually won in the bottom of the ninth inning, 9–8.

Martinez' season ended early in a start against the Milwaukee Brewers on September 25 in which he threw only seven pitches. He also missed the postseason as the Cardinals had already clinched a playoff berth. The injury was a shoulder strain, but surgery was deemed unnecessary and he would recover in time for the next season. His first season in the starting rotation included 14–7 record, a 3.01 ERA and 179 2/3 IP. He finished in the top ten in the NL in ERA, won-lost percentage, SO/9, wins, home runs per nine innings allowed, and wild pitches. His 9.2 SO/9 was the third-highest single-season average in franchise history.

==== 2016 season ====
Martinez was granted permission to leave the team April 30, 2016, to resolve a civil suit filed against him in Miami, Florida. The Cardinals conducted an investigation regarding the allegations in the case, which suspected to be domestic violence. MLB did not contact the Cardinals at the time, but had recently updated their personal conduct policy, especially if any player had committed such an offensive of domestic violence.

Martinez started 31 games in the 2016 season, ending with a 16–9 record, a 3.04 ERA, and 195.1 innings pitched.

==== 2017 season ====
On February 2, 2017, it was announced that Martínez had signed a five-year extension with the St. Louis Cardinals worth 51 million dollars. On April 2, 2017, Martinez pitched his first Opening Night start of his career, playing the defending World Series champion Chicago Cubs at Busch Stadium. He struck out 10 and allowed no walks and six hits over 7 1/3 innings. He received a no-decision as Randal Grichuk hit a walk-off bases-loaded single in the bottom of the ninth. At Yankee Stadium on April 15, Martínez struck out 11 batters, and walked eight, becoming the first to record both those marks in the same game since Randy Johnson in 1993. Martínez completed 5 1/3 innings in a 3−2 loss to New York. On June 10, Martinez pitched both his first career complete game and shutout while allowing four hits as the Cardinals defeated the Philadelphia Phillies 7–0.

For the second time in his career, Martínez became an All-Star selection, as resulted in a vote by fellow players. Through that point in the season, Martínez' 2.88 ERA ranked seventh in the NL, and his 10.2 K/9 was his career best.

Martínez pitched in 32 games (all starts) in 2017, compiling a 12–11 record, 3.64 ERA, and a 1.22 WHIP. He led all MLB pitchers in errors, with four.

==== 2018 season ====
The Cardinals selected Martínez to start 2018 Opening Day, making it his second consecutive year doing so. It occurred versus the New York Mets on March 29, where he walked six and hit one batter, ending with a 9–4 defeat. He hit his first career home run on May 2, which was versus the Chicago White Sox. On the mound, he allowed five hits and one earned run over 7 1/3 innings to drop his ERA to 1.40 through that point in the season. Martinez finished the game pitching 7.1 innings as the Cardinals won a close game 3–2. On May 10, Martinez was placed on the 10-day disabled list due to a right lat strain. On July 21, Martinez was again placed on the 10-day disabled list due to a right oblique strain. He was activated on August 21 and moved to the bullpen. He finished 2018 with an 8–6 record and a 3.11 ERA in 33 games (18 starts) with five saves.

==== 2019–2021 seasons ====
Martínez began the 2019 season on the 10-day injured list due to a strained rotator cuff. When he returned, he returned as a reliever, eventually taking over closing duties. Over 48 relief appearances during the regular season, he earned 24 saves in 27 opportunities with a 3.17 ERA, striking out 53 over 48 1/3 innings.

After the 2020 season, Martínez played for Águilas Cibaeñas of the Dominican Professional Baseball League (LIDOM). He has also played for Dominican Republic in the 2021 Caribbean Series.

During the 2020 season, a year that was shortened due to an ongoing COVID-19 crisis, Martinez had an 0–3 record and a 9.90 ERA in five starts.

On June 2, 2021, Martínez had one of the worst outings in his professional career as he allowed 10 runs against the Los Angeles Dodgers in the first inning and was taken out of the game after recording just two outs. On July 9, he was placed on the 60-day injured list with a torn thumb ligament. On July 19, Martínez underwent surgery to repair the ligament tear in his right thumb and missed the remainder of the season.

After the season, the Cardinals declined Martínez's option for the 2022 season, making him a free agent for the first time in his career.

=== San Francisco Giants ===
On March 19, 2022, Martínez signed a minor league contract with the San Francisco Giants. He was released without making an appearance for the organization on April 28.

=== Boston Red Sox ===
Martínez subsequently signed a minor league contract with the Boston Red Sox on May 7, 2022. In his organizational debut with the Triple-A Worcester Red Sox on May 8, starting against the Toledo Mud Hens, he lasted 2/3 of an inning while giving up five runs on four hits and two walks. In two starts for Worcester, Martínez struggled to an 0–2 record and 20.77 ERA with four strikeouts across 4 1/3 innings pitched. He was released by the Red Sox organization on May 18.

On May 27, 2022, MLB suspended Martínez for 80 games after testing positive for ibutamoren. On September 1, MLB again suspended Martínez, this time for 85 games after violating the league's Joint Domestic Violence, Sexual Assault and Child Abuse Policy, retroactive to June 19. Per the terms of the policy, Martínez would participate in a confidential evaluation and treatment program supervised by the Joint Policy Board.

=== Toros de Tijuana ===
On February 14, 2023, Martínez signed with the Toros de Tijuana of the Mexican League. In five starts, Martínez posted a 1–0 record with a 7.15 ERA and 17 strikeouts over 22 1/3 innings. He was released on May 19.

=== Acereros de Monclova ===
On June 24, 2023, Martínez signed with the Acereros de Monclova. In three starts, he posted a 1–0 record with a 6.97 ERA and 10 1/3 innings pitched. Martínez was waived by Monclova on July 10.

=== Olmecas de Tabasco ===
On May 8, 2024, Martínez signed with the Olmecas de Tabasco of the Mexican League. In 22 games (5 starts) for Tabasco, he posted a 2–4 record and 4.70 ERA with 36 strikeouts across 46 innings pitched. Martínez was released by the Olmecas on March 13, 2025.

== Awards ==
Award/honor	# of times	Dates (Ranking or event)	Refs
Major Leagues
Major League Baseball All-Star	2	2015, 2017	
Minor Leagues
Major League Baseball All-Star Futures Game	1	2011	
Minor Leagues All-Star	1	2010 (Dominican Summer League)	
Minor Leagues Pitcher of the Month	1	June 2013	
Baseball America's Top 100 minor league prospects	3	pre-2012 (#27), pre-2013 (#38), pre-2014 (#31)	
MLB.com's Top 50 minor league prospects	2	pre-2012 (#30), pre-2013 (#33)	
Baseball Prospectus' Top minor league prospects	2	pre-2012 (#31), pre-2013 (#43)	
TCN/Scout.com Dominican Summer League Cardinals Starting Pitcher of the Year	1	2010	
The Cardinal Nation/Scout.com Top Prospect	3	2011 (#5), 2012 (#2), 2013 (#5)	

== Pitching profile ==
Standing 6 feet 0 inches (1.83 m) and weighing 185 pounds (84 kg), Carlos Martínez has been commonly compared to former Cy Young winner and Hall of Famer Pedro Martínez, due to being right-handed, having a similar physique, and deceptive and surprisingly fluid pitching mechanics. Further, they both are considered power pitchers with undersized builds featuring explosive and electric pitching repertoires. For this, Carlos Martínez has been nicknamed "Baby Pedro." In spite of his stereotypic physical limitations, certain attributes such as his natural athleticism cover somewhat for the lack of height. Further, a loose frame and naturally quick release also play up his skills on the mound. Martínez started his professional career throwing three pitches, a fastball, curveball, and a changeup. He has since added a sinking fastball and slider.

The high-velocity, electric fastball that originally caught the attention of Red Sox scouts when Martínez was 17 has developed into an elite-level pitch beyond initial expectations. His fastball has drawn further comparisons with Pedro Martínez. With a wiry and athletic frame, Carlos Martinez' arm generates enormous speed that dispenses dynamic velocity and movement, reaching up to 100 miles per hour (160 km/h), while situated primarily in the range of 94–96 miles per hour (151–154 km/h).

Martínez maintains fastball fleetness both from the windup and from the stretch. Because his arm speed generates immense recoil, he finishes off-balance, leaving him in an awkward position to field certain batted balls. His fastball is graded at 70 on a standard 20–80 scale, with a volatile life that vaults itself on batters, making it difficult for them to square their bats, and thus, hit effectively. His small stature and long recoil somewhat limit the command, but that is mitigated with the natural explosiveness and movement of the pitch. The sinking version of his fastball can get up to 96 MPH, while averaging 92–93 miles per hour (148–150 km/h).

The curveball Martínez throws is one of his breaking balls, grading at a 50 on the 20–80 scale, and 60 potential on a 20–80 scale as of October 2012. It features either an 11-to-5 or 12-to-6 break and it is very difficult to hit when in top form. The main discrepancy with this pitch is when he gets around on it and finishes with a "looping" effect. His other breaking pitch, the slider, became a fastball alternative go-to pitch in 2013. Also a power pitch, it averages 82.5 miles per hour (132.8 km/h) with −2.16 inches (−55 mm) of vertical break, and has proven to be effective in garnering swing-and-miss strikes.

The changeup was Martínez' secondary pitch throughout his rise in minor leagues. It averages in the mid- to upper-80s MPH and shows some sink at times, and grades at 40 on a 20–80 scale with 50 potential, as of October 2012. However, he also lacked feel and can throw it too firmly. It is especially effective, however, because of his ability to throw it with nearly identical arm speed to his fastball. With the efficaciousness of the fastball and curveball, the changeup is not required in a relief role, but gives a versatile option when starting. Overall, throwing strikes needs to improve, especially down in the strike zone, according to Baseball Prospect Nation. Nonetheless, this could develop into a plus skill. He naturally operates high in the strike zone, so working down will shift the hitters' eye levels in addition to the confounding movement of the fastball and curveball.

Whether there have been any concerns about effectiveness related to Martínez' lack of physical stature, his career minor league numbers have minimized them through 2013. In 327 2/3 IP, he has allowed just 14 HR for a rate of 0.4 HR/9. He allowed one home run in 28 1/3 IP with the major league club in 2013. His ground-ball rate was above 50 percent in 2012–13, after steadily increasing as he progressed through the minor leagues. It was 52.3% for the Cardinals in 2013. His fly-ball rate has held steady throughout his professional career.

== Personal life ==
Martínez and his wife, Laura Rivas, have three sons.

Martínez was suspended by Major League Baseball in 2022 for violating its Joint Domestic Violence, Sexual Assault and Child Abuse Policy, though the league did not reveal what actions led to this discipline.

== Philanthropy ==
In 2015, Martínez founded the Tsunami Waves Foundation to help children in need in Missouri, Illinois, and the Dominican Republic. He has visited schools and set up baseball clinics in Fairmont City, Illinois and collected gloves and other baseball equipment for kids in Puerto Plata. He hosted an annual charity bowling event to raise money for the foundation.

== See also ==
- List of Major League Baseball players from the Dominican Republic
- St. Louis Cardinals all-time roster
