= Princeton, California =

Princeton
- census-designated place
- Location in California
- Coordinates: 39°24′12″N 122°00′36″W
- Country: United States
- State: California
- County: Colusa

Area
  - Total: 1.460 sq mi (3.781 km^{2})
  - Land: 1.460 sq mi (3.781 km^{2})
  - Water: 0 sq mi (0 km^{2}) 0%
- Elevation: 82 ft (25 m)

Population (2020)
  - Total: 309
  - Density: 212/sq mi (81.7/km^{2})
- Time zone: UTC-8 (Pacific (PST))
  - Summer (DST): UTC-7 (PDT)
- ZIP Code: 95970
- Area codes: 530, 837
- GNIS feature IDs: 1659436, 2583118

Princeton (formerly, Ket-tee) is a census-designated place in Colusa County, California, United States. It lies at an elevation of 82 feet (25 m). Its ZIP code is 95970 and its area code is 530. Princeton's population was 309 at the 2020 census.

== History ==
Before Euro-American settlers came to the region, Colus Indians inhabited the region. The first Euro-American settler in the area around Princeton was John S. Williams, who was sent by Thomas Larkin, the American Consul to Mexico, whose children were given an 44,364 acre land grant from Governor Manuel Micheltorena in 1844. Williams built an adobe in 1847 near the abandoned Patwin village of Chah’ de’-he near Princeton and established a successful cattle ranch.

The first establishment in what became the town proper was a roadhouse called the Sixteen-Mile House, built in 1851. In the 1870s grain farming became successful in the region. Princeton had a grain warehouse and served as a point where farmers could bring their grain to be shipped by boat to larger markets down river. By 1897 Princeton was a small town of 250 people with a number of businesses including a bank, hotel, and grocery store.

For nearly 130 years Princeton had an operating ferry that connected residents to the community of Afton across the Sacramento River. However, it was closed down by Glenn County officials in 1986 due to safety and financial considerations. Ferry service temporarily resumed in 1988, with a 50-cent toll to defray maintenance costs, but was ultimately shut down permanently at some point in the late 1990s. The remains of the ferry and dock can be found at 39°24'43.3"N 122°00'35.1"W.

Today, Princeton is probably best known as the home of Farmers Brewing Company, which distributes craft beers regionally.

== Demographics ==
Historical population
| Census | Pop. | Note | %± |
|---|---|---|---|
| 2010 | 303 | | — |
| 2020 | 309 | | 2.0% |
U.S. Decennial Census; 2010

Princeton first appeared as a census designated place in the 2010 U.S. census.

The 2020 United States census reported that Princeton had a population of 309. The population density was 211.6 inhabitants per square mile (81.7/km^{2}). The racial makeup of Princeton was 208 (67.3%) White, 0 (0.0%) African American, 10 (3.2%) Native American, 1 (0.3%) Asian, 0 (0.0%) Pacific Islander, 63 (20.4%) from other races, and 27 (8.7%) from two or more races. Hispanic or Latino of any race were 93 persons (30.1%).

The whole population lived in households. There were 122 households, out of which 41 (33.6%) had children under the age of 18 living in them, 64 (52.5%) were married-couple households, 6 (4.9%) were cohabiting couple households, 26 (21.3%) had a female householder with no partner present, and 26 (21.3%) had a male householder with no partner present. 33 households (27.0%) were one person, and 21 (17.2%) were one person aged 65 or older. The average household size was 2.53. There were 83 families (68.0% of all households).

The age distribution was 58 people (18.8%) under the age of 18, 31 people (10.0%) aged 18 to 24, 64 people (20.7%) aged 25 to 44, 98 people (31.7%) aged 45 to 64, and 58 people (18.8%) who were 65 years of age or older. The median age was 45.5 years. For every 100 females, there were 116.1 males.

There were 148 housing units at an average density of 101.4 units per square mile (39.2 units/km^{2}), of which 122 (82.4%) were occupied. Of these, 77 (63.1%) were owner-occupied, and 45 (36.9%) were occupied by renters.

== Politics ==
In the state legislature, Princeton is in the 1st senatorial district, represented by Republican Megan Dahle, and the 4th Assembly district, represented by Democrat Cecilia Aguiar-Curry. Federally, Princeton is in California's 1st congressional district, represented by Republican James Gallagher.

== Education ==
Princeton is served by the Princeton Joint Unified School District.

Princeton has a high school and elementary school, both of which have an enrollment of just over 100 students each.
