= Johnny Stuart =

American baseball player (1901–1970)

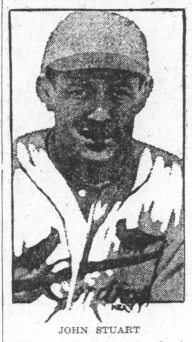
- Pitcher
- Born: April 27, 1901; Clinton, Tennessee, U.S.
- Died: May 13, 1970 (aged 69); Charleston, West Virginia, U.S.
- Batted: Right Threw: Right

MLB debut
- July 27, 1922, for the St. Louis Cardinals

Last MLB appearance
- October 2, 1925, for the St. Louis Cardinals

MLB statistics
- Win–loss record: 20–18
- Earned run average: 4.76
- Strikeouts: 124
- Stats at Baseball Reference

Teams
- St. Louis Cardinals (1922–1925)

John Davis Stuart (April 27, 1901 – May 13, 1970), nicknamed "Stud," was an American Major League Baseball pitcher who played for the St. Louis Cardinals from 1922 to 1925.

He attended Ohio State University, where he played baseball and football. In a 1921 football game against Michigan, he punted the ball, then recovered his own punt for a touchdown, one of two total scored in a 14–0 victory. After graduating, he was signed by the St. Louis Cardinals organization. He began 1922 with the Syracuse Stars, and had a 4-5 record with a 4.00 earned run average (ERA) in 15 games. After playing in two games for the Cardinals in 1922, Stuart was on the roster full-time in 1923, finishing the season with a 9–5 record and a 4.27 ERA in 37 games, spending time as both a starting pitcher and relief pitcher. He was the Cardinals' opening day starting pitcher in 1924. He played in 28 games for the Cardinals that season, going 9–11 with a 4.75 ERA. After one more season with the Cardinals and one with the Oakland Oaks, he retired from professional play and went into coaching.

Stuart coached Marshall University basketball and baseball, winning four straight West Virginia Athletic Conference titles for the Herd from 1928 to 1931, and had 11 players named to the All-West Virginia team and one, Johnny Watson, who signed with the Detroit Tigers in 1930. He was 67-21-1 at Marshall baseball. He was 46-29 as the Marshall basketball coach (1927–31), losing the WVIAC title to Glenville State late in his best season, 12–3 in 1929–30. He was an assistant coach for Marshall football from 1927 to 1931, helping the Herd to win WVIAC titles in 1928 and 1931, with Marshall going 27-15-3 during his time on the sidelines for the Herd. He also served as manager and club president of the Huntington Boosters of the Mid-Atlantic League.
