= Hamilton Unified School District =

School district in California, United States

Hamilton Unified School District is a school district headquartered in Hamilton City, California.

Located in Glenn County, it includes Hamilton City. It covers some areas for grades Pre-Kindergarten to 12, and some for high school only. The feeder elementary school district of its 9-12 area is Capay Joint Union Elementary School District.

== History ==
In 2008 there was a referendum on whether Hamilton Union Elementary School District and Hamilton Union High School District should merge.

The district formed on July 1, 2009 with the merger of the elementary and high school district. The superintendent of the high school district and the principal of its high school, Ray Odom, became the superintendent of the unified district.

== Governance ==
Hamilton Unified School District has five Board of Education members who are elected by the community. As of 2025-2026 school year, the current Board of Education members are Hubert Lower (President), Ray Odom, Gabriel Leal, Vanessa Reyes Ortiz, and Rod Boone. The current superintendent is Jeremy Powell.

== Schools ==
- Hamilton High School (grades 9-12)
- Hamilton Elementary School (K-8 school)

Alternative

- Hamilton Community Day School (7-12)
- Ella Barkley High School (10-12)
