= Jacinto, California =

Unincorporated community in California, United States

Jacinto
- Unincorporated community
- Location in California Jacinto (the United States)
- Coordinates: 39°34′52″N 122°00′24″W
- Country: United States
- State: California
- County: Glenn
- Elevation: 112 ft (34 m)

Jacinto is a small unincorporated community in Glenn County, California, United States. Named for Jacinto Rodriguez, who received a Mexican land grant in the area in 1844, it is located on the Sacramento River, 11 miles (18 km) east-northeast of Willows, at an elevation of 112 feet (34 m).

A post office was established at Jacinto March 19, 1858 and operated until November 15, 1910. Jacinto was the home of Dr. Hugh J. Glenn, a prominent figure in California politics.
