= Ordbend, California =

Unincorporated community in California, United States

Ord Bend Ordbend
- Unincorporated community
- Location in California Ord Bend (the United States)
- Coordinates: 39°37′47″N 122°00′20″W
- Country: United States
- State: California
- County: Glenn
- Elevation: 121 ft (37 m)

Ord Bend (also Ordbend) is a small unincorporated community approximately 121 feet (37 m) above mean sea level in Glenn County, California, United States. For road traffic, Ord Bend is along State Route 45 between Glenn and Hamilton City. It is about eight miles (13 km) south of Hamilton City. The ZIP Code, shared with Glenn and Bayliss, is 95943. The community is served by area code 530. This area is flagged as rural by the U.S. Census Bureau.

The Sacramento River passes east of the area. Much of the nearby area is agricultural land under cultivation with rice, almonds, walnuts, olives and prunes. Sandhill cranes are evident in the area during winter.

The Ord Bend Volunteer Fire Department holds a pancake breakfast at the local community hall each year to raise funds for firefighting equipment.

There was once a school house in Ord Bend but most school age children now attend nearby Hamilton Union Elementary School and Hamilton Union High School. Bus service is provided by the Hamilton Union School District.

The Ord Store operated for many years selling basic groceries, lunch and snack items, and (at one time) gas. Locals were able to run a monthly tab. It has not been in operation since the early 2000s.

== Toponymy ==
The Southern Pacific Railroad named a station along its now-abandoned Colusa branch, along the west bank of the Sacramento River, Ord Bend as recognition of the nearby Ord Ranch, owned in the 1850s by U.S. Army MG Edward O.C. Ord and two of his brothers.

== Politics ==
In the state legislature, Ord Bend is in the 4th senatorial district, represented by Republican Marie Alvarado-Gil, and in the 3rd Assembly district, represented by Vacant.

Federally, Ord Bend is in California's 1st congressional district, represented by Republican James Gallagher.
