= Hamilton High School (Hamilton City, California) =

Location
- Highway 32 & Canal Street; Hamilton City, California 95951; United States; 39°44′44″N 122°01′05″W

Information
- Type: Public
- Established: 1917
- School district: Hamilton Unified School District (2009-); Hamilton Union High School District (-2009)
- Principal: Cris Oseguera
- Staff: 19.05 (on FTE basis)
- Grades: 9 to 12
- Enrollment: 293 (2023-2024)
- Student to teacher ratio: 15.38
- Colors: Royal Blue and Gold
- Athletics conference: CIF Mid Valley League
- Sports: Football, Baseball, Softball, Soccer-Boys, Soccer-Girls, Basketball-Boys, Basketball-Girls, Cheerleading, Cross Country, Track and Field, Volleyball, Wrestling
- Mascot: Indian Brave
- Team name: Hamilton Braves
- Website: https://hhs.husdschools.org/

Hamilton High School, formerly Hamilton Union High School, is a public high school located at 620 Canal Street in Hamilton City, California. It serves grades nine through twelve. It is a part of the Hamilton Unified School District.

Until 2009, it was the only school in its district (Hamilton Union High School District). The Hamilton High and Hamilton Elementary Districts unified to the new Hamilton Unified School District on July 1, 2009, with Capay Elementary School in Capay remaining as an independent feeder school district. Hamilton Unified School District includes Hamilton High School, Hamilton Elementary School, Ella Barkley Continuation High School, and Hamilton Adult School.

The current principal is Cris Osiguera, serving since 2009.

== Activities ==
=== Sports ===
The school competes athletically under the mascot of the Hamilton Braves. The girls' sports teams are commonly referred to as "Lady Braves".

Due to the school colors of Blue & Gold, many posters at athletic events use the slogan, "Go Big Blue!"

The National Anthem is played during the opening ceremonies at each football game. It is concluded by the team and fans calling "BRAVES!" at the appropriate moment of the phrase, "...and the home of the brave."

Sports teams consist of the following:

- Football
- Baseball
- Softball
- Soccer-Boys
- Soccer-Girls
- Basketball-Boys
- Basketball-Girls
- Cheerleading
- Track and Field
- Volleyball
- Wrestling
- Cross Country

=== Clubs ===
Hamilton High School offers a variety of non-athletic clubs and organizations:

- Academic Decathlon
- Associated Student Body
- Boosters
- CSF (California Scholarship Federation)
- FFA (Future Farmers of America)
- FNL (Friday Night Live)
- MEChA
- Photography
- Science Club
- SWAT (Students Working Against Tobacco)
- "The Tomahawk" Yearbook

== Achievements ==
Hamilton High was recognized as a California Distinguished School in 2007.

Hamilton High has a record of having the highest academic performance index scores in Glenn County.

Academically, the school requires geometry to graduate and offers advanced placement calculus and statistics.

Seventy percent of the students go on to college. The most recent survey revealed that 32 percent earned a college diploma after five years.

The girls volleyball team won league championship seven years in a row.

Boys basketball won the section in 2010 and boys soccer won sections two years in a row.

In 2008, the Hamilton Braves football team represented Northern California in the California State Bowl in Los Angeles.

Since the school is located in an agricultural community, many of the students at Hamilton are involved with Future Farmers of America, gaining skills in agriculture, agribusiness and leadership. The school has an on-campus farm where students can raise animals.

== Ella Barkley High School ==
Ella Barkley High School is a continuation school for grades 10–12. It is an alternative education program housed on the Hamilton High campus.

== Previous administrators ==
Longtime Hamilton Union High School Principal/Superintendent Ray Odom served as the first Superintendent of the newly formed Hamilton Unified School District beginning in 2009 until retiring in 2011. Odom graduated from Hamilton High School in 1965 and began at HUHS in 1977 as vice principal and part-time faculty and coach. In 1980, the principal of Hamilton High left the school and Odom took the job, serving until unification of the two Hamilton City school districts. Cris Oseguera took over as Principal at Hamilton High in 2009, improving and building upon the strong tradition of high academic standards, competitive athletics, and agriculture based education programs.

Today, about 42 percent of HHS students choose to come from other districts and total enrollment at the high school is nearly 300. The school district currently has about 720 students.

== Notable alumni ==
- Kyle Lohse, Major League Baseball pitcher
- Rigoberto Sanchez, National Football League Punter
