= Bayliss, California =

Unincorporated community in California, United States

Bayliss
- Unincorporated community
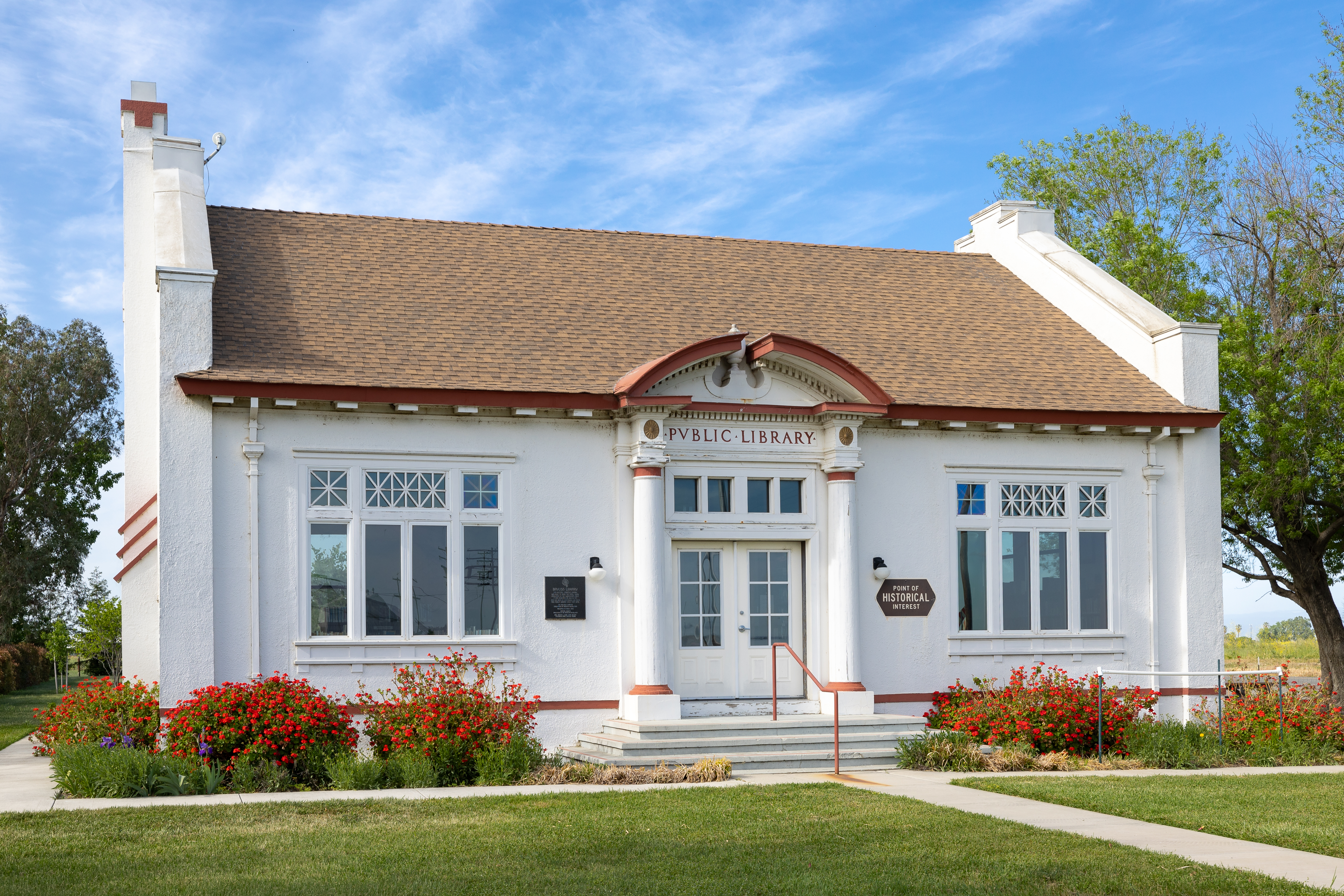
- The Bayliss Carnegie Library in April 2023

- Location in California Bayliss (the United States)
- Coordinates: 39°34′58″N 122°02′45″W
- Country: United States
- State: California
- County: Glenn
- Elevation: 112 ft (34 m)

Bayliss is an unincorporated community in Glenn County, California, United States. It is located 9 miles (14 km) east-northeast of Willows, at an elevation of 112 feet (34 m).

The ZIP Code, shared with Ordbend and Glenn, is 95943. The community is served by area code 530.

Emergency services are provided by the Bayliss Volunteer Fire Department.

== Bayliss Carnegie Library ==
The most notable feature of Bayliss is one of the last operational Carnegie libraries located at 7830 County Road 39. The library was built in 1917 and serves a center of culture and community in the area.
