= Glenn, California =

Unincorporated community in California, United States

Glenn
- Unincorporated community
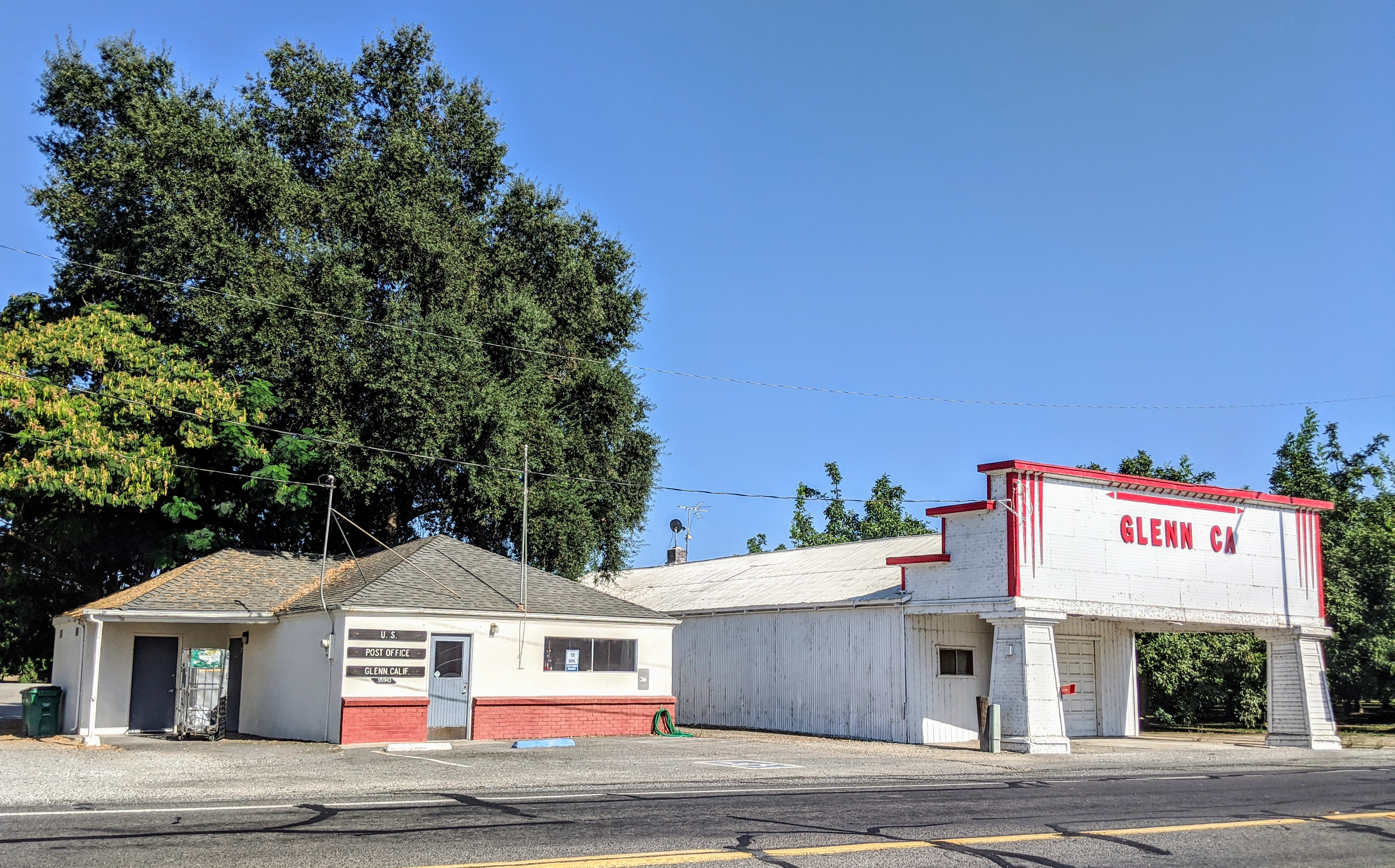
- Glenn in 2020

- Location in California Glenn (the United States)
- Coordinates: 39°31′19″N 122°00′50″W
- Country: United States
- State: California
- County: Glenn
- Elevation: 98 ft (30 m)

Glenn is an unincorporated community in Glenn County, California, United States. It lies at an elevation of 98 feet (30 m). The town is located on the Sacramento River, at the intersection of State Route 45 and State Route 162. It is approximately ten miles (16 km) east of Interstate 5 and Willows on the U.S. Geological Survey 7.5-minute quadrangle, Glenn, California. The U.S. Geological Survey, National Geographic Names Database, calls its existence official with a feature ID of 1658621 and lists the NAD27 coordinates of the community as 39°31′19″N 122°00′50″W. The ZIP Code, shared with Ordbend and Bayliss, is 95943. The community is inside area code 530. This area is flagged as rural by the U.S. Census Bureau.

== History ==
The first post office at Glenn opened in 1903. A. K. Barham owned and operated the Glenn Store and on November 14, 1913, was appointed postmaster. At that time, the post office was located in the store. The town had a church, school, several homes and a saloon. Barham's father was a foreman on one of the wheat ranches of Dr. Hugh J. Glenn in Glenn County.

== Terrain and local landmarks ==
The area is relatively flat land along the banks of the Sacramento River. A local landmark is the Glenn Post Office on SR45 just north of SR162. Farther north still along SR45 is the local Mennonite Church as there is a modest population of Mennonite farming families in this area. Much of the area is agricultural land under cultivation. West of town, there is a natural gas well field along SR162 between Glenn and Willows.

== Politics ==
In the state legislature, Glenn is in the 4th senatorial district, represented by Republican Marie Alvarado-Gil, and in the 3rd Assembly district, represented by Vacant.

Federally, Glenn is in California's 1st congressional district, represented by Republican James Gallagher.

== Sources ==
- U.S. Geological Survey, National Geographic Names Database.
- Map: U.S. Geological Survey, Glenn, California, 7.5-minute Quadrangle, 1969.
- Map: Road Map of California: 1958, (Sacramento, California: Department of Public Works; Division of Highways, 1958).
- Map: State of California, Division of Oil, Gas, and Geothermal Resources, District 6, Map 620.
