= List of bridges on the National Register of Historic Places in California =

This is a list of bridges and tunnels on the National Register of Historic Places in California.

== List ==
Name	Image	Built	Listed	Location	County	Type
Albion River Bridge		1944	2017-07-31	Albion; 39.2266°N 123.7691°W	Mendocino	wooden deck truss bridge
Alexander-Acacia Bridge		1925, 1927	1984-01-05	Larkspur; 37°55′49″N 122°31′51″W	Marin	
Bridgeport Covered Bridge		1862	1971-07-14	French Corral	Nevada	Covered combination truss & arch
Burro Schmidt's Tunnel		1938	2003-03-20	Ridgecrest	Kern	Earthen tunnel
Calaveritas Creek Bridge		1928	2015-11-06	Calaveritas; 38°9′22″N 120°36′35″W	Calaveras	
California Powder Works Bridge		1872	2015-02-27	Santa Cruz; 37°0′38″N 122°2′38″W	Santa Cruz	Covered Smith truss, National Historic Landmark
Carneros Creek Bridge on Old Sonoma Road		1896	2005-08-05	Napa; 38°15′24″N 122°20′22″W	Napa	Masonry arch
Colorado Street Bridge		1913	1981-02-12	Pasadena; 34°8′41″N 118°9′49″W	Los Angeles	
Dinkey Creek Bridge		1938	1996-09-05	Dinkey Creek; 37°4′3″N 119°9′12″W	Fresno	Timber bowstring arch truss
Durgan Bridge		1938	2012-7-10	Downieville; 39°33′35″N 120°49′46″W	Sierra	Highway Bridges of California MPS
Old Fair Oaks Bridge		1907	2006-09-25	Fair Oaks; 38°38′17″N 121°15′54″W	Sacramento	Pennsylvania petit truss
Felton Covered Bridge	Felton Covered Bridge	1892	1973-06-19	Felton; 37°03′03″N 122°04′15″W	Santa Cruz	Covered Pratt-Warren truss
Fernbridge (bridge)	Fernbridge	1911	1987-4-2	Fernbridge; 40°36′51″N 124°12′8″W	Humboldt	Concrete arch bridge
First Street Bridge	First Street Bridge	1914	2004-08-05	Napa; 38°18′6″N 122°16′42″W	Napa	Concrete girder
Five Mile Drive-Sutter Creek Bridge		1910	1986-04-11	Ione; 38°21′14″N 120°57′27″W	Amador	Pony Pratt half-truss
Garnett Creek Bridge on CA 29		1902, 1914	2005-08-05	Calistoga; 38°35′35″N 122°35′25″W	Napa	Masonry arch
Garnett Creek Bridge on Greenwood Avenue		1904	2005-08-05	Calistoga; 38°36′13″N 122°35′18″W	Napa	Masonry arch
Generals' Highway Stone Bridges	Generals' Highway Stone Bridge	1930, 1931	1978-09-13	Mineral King; 36°36′27″N 118°44′46″W	Tulare	Stone
Georgia Street Bridge-Caltrans Bridge		1914	1999-02-12	San Diego; 32°44′55″N 117°8′40″W	San Diego	Open-spandrel arch
Gianella Bridge	Gianella Bridge	1910, 1937, 1938	1982-07-08	Hamilton City; 39°45′4″N 121°59′46″W	Butte, Glenn	Steel swing bridge, demolished 1987
Glen Canyon Covered Bridge	Clen Canyon Covered Bridge	1892, 1939	1984-05-17	Santa Cruz; 37°0′0″N 122°0′8″W	Santa Cruz	Covered
Guerneville Bridge		1922	1989-08-04	Guerneville; 38°30′4″N 122°59′40″W	Sonoma	Pratt through truss
Hansen Bridge		1935	2012-7-10	Downieville; 39°33′47″N 120°49′31″W	Sierra	Highway Bridges of California MPS
Healdsburg Memorial Bridge		1921	2011-4-11	Healdsburg; 38°36′14″N 122°51′36″W	Sonoma	Pennsylvania (Petit) truss
Honey Run Covered Bridge	Honey Run Covered Bridge	1894, 1895, 1896	1988-06-23	Chico; 39°43′44″N 121°42′9″W	Butte	Covered Pratt truss, destroyed 2018 rebuilt 2022 - 2025
Hospital Bridge		1910	2012-7-10	Downieville; 39°34′11″N 120°49′21″W	Sierra	Highway Bridges of California MPS
I Street Bridge	I Street Bridge	1910, 1911	1982-04-22	Sacramento; 38°34′39″N 121°30′18″W	Sacramento, Yolo	Double-deck steel truss
Jersey Bridge	Jersey Bridge	1938	2012-7-10	Downieville; 39°33′30″N 120°49′40″W	Sierra	Highway Bridges of California MPS
Knight's Ferry Bridge	Knight's Ferry Bridge	1864	2012-10-16	Knight's Ferry; 37°39′48″N 120°27′44″W	Stanislaus	Covered Howe truss, National Historic Landmark
La Loma Bridge		1914	2004-07-14	Pasadena; 34°8′3″N 118°9′57″W	Los Angeles	
Lower Blackburn Grade Bridge		1925	1981-06-25	Bridgeville; 40°28′50″N 123°53′22″W	Humboldt	reinforced concrete through arch
Maxwell Creek Bridge on Hardin Road		1909	2005-08-05	Locoallomi; 38°36′6″N 122°22′12″W	Napa	Masonry arch
Milliken Creek Bridge		1908	2004-08-05	Napa; 38°19′32″N 122°16′23″W	Napa	Stone arch
Mountain Quarries Bridge	Mountain Quarries Bridge	1912	2004-02-11	Auburn; 38°54′46″N 121°2′25″W	Placer	Concrete arch
Napa River Bridge on Zinfandel Lane		1913	2005-08-05	St. Helena; 38°29′44″N 122°32′22″W	Napa	Masonry arch
Oaklawn Bridge and Waiting Station		1906	1973-07-16	South Pasadena; 34°7′8″N 118°9′8″W	Los Angeles	
Oregon Creek Covered Bridge		1860	1975-05-30	North San Juan; 39°23′48″N 121°4′52″W	Yuba	Covered
Pacific Electric Railroad Bridge	Pacific Electric Railroad Bridge	1912	1989-07-13	Torrance; 33°50′15″N 118°18′39″W	Los Angeles	Deck arch
Pilarcitos Creek Bridge		1900	2014-04-07	Half Moon Bay; 37.466045°N 122.428852°W	San Mateo	
Pope Street Bridge		1894	1972-10-05	St. Helena; 38°30′41″N 122°27′17″W	Napa	Triple arch
Rattlesnake Canyon Bridge		1919	2017-01-17	Santa Barbara; 34°27′27″N 119°41′32″W	Santa Barbara	Stone arch
San Francisco–Oakland Bay Bridge		1936	2001-08-13	San Francisco	San Francisco	Cantilever truss/suspension
Sather Gate and Bridge		1910	1982-03-25	Berkeley; 37°52′14″N 122°15′31″W	Alameda	
Swartz Creek Bridge on Aetna Springs Road		1912	2005-08-05	Aetna Springs; 38°39′12″N 122°28′32″W	Napa	Masonry arch
Tocaloma Bridge		1927	2018-09-14	Tocaloma; 38.0503°N 122.7599°W	Marin	
Tower Bridge		1934–1936	1982-06-24	Sacramento, Yolo; 38°34′18″N 121°30′25″W	Sacramento	Vertical-lift bridge
Wawona Covered Bridge	Wawona Covered Bridge	1868, 1878, 1956	2007-01-11	Wawona; 37°32′19″N 119°39′17″W	Mariposa	Covered modified queenpost through truss
Yosemite Valley Bridges	Happy Valley Bridge	1922	1977-11-25	Yosemite Village	Mariposa	Rustic
