= List of covered bridges in California =

Below is a list of covered bridges in California. There are ten authentic covered bridges in the U.S. state of California, and eight of them are historic. A covered bridge is considered authentic not due to its age, but by its construction. An authentic bridge is constructed using trusses rather than other methods such as stringers, a popular choice for non-authentic covered bridges.

== List ==
Name	Image	County	Location	Built	Length	Crosses	Ownership	Truss	Notes
Berta's Ranch Covered Bridge	Berta's Ranch Covered Bridge	Humboldt	Rosewood; 40°43′28″N 124°10′37″W	1936	52 feet (16 m)	Elk River		Queen	
Bridgeport Covered Bridge	Bridgeport Covered Bridge	Nevada	French Corral; 39°17′33″N 121°11′42″W	1862	233 feet (71 m)	South Yuba River	Nevada County Division of Highways	Howe and arch	
Brookwood Covered Bridge		Humboldt	Bayside; 40°49′55″N 124°2′44″W	1969	66 feet (20 m)	Jacoby Creek		Howe	
California Powder Works Bridge	California Powder Works Bridge	Santa Cruz	Santa Cruz; 37°0′38″N 122°2′38″W	1872	180 feet (55 m)	San Lorenzo River	Private	Smith	Also called Masonic Park Covered Bridge
Felton Covered Bridge	Felton Covered Bridge	Santa Cruz	Felton; 37°03′03″N 122°04′15″W	1892	163 feet (50 m)	San Lorenzo River	County of Santa Cruz	Pratt-Warren	
Honey Run Covered Bridge	Honey Run Covered Bridge	Butte	Chico; 39°43′43″N 121°42′13″W	1886, rebuilt 2022 - 2025	240 feet (73 m)	Butte Creek	Honey Run Covered Bridge Association	Pratt	Destroyed by Camp Fire in 2018 and later rebuilt.
Knight's Ferry Bridge	Knight's Ferry Bridge	Stanislaus	Knight's Ferry; 37°39′48″N 120°27′44″W	1864	379 feet (116 m)	Stanislaus River	U.S. Army Corps of Engineers, Sacramento District	Howe	
Oregon Creek Covered Bridge	Oregon Creek Covered Bridge	Yuba	North San Juan; 39°23′48″N 121°4′52″W	1860	105 feet (32 m)	Oregon Creek	County of Yuba	Queen	Also called Freeman's Crossing Covered Bridge
Simpson Ranch Covered Bridge		Placer	Meadow Vista; 39°0′36″N 121°0′40″W		22 feet (6.7 m)	Wooley Creek		King	Also called Foothill Roots Farm Covered Bridge
Wawona Covered Bridge	Wawona Covered Bridge	Mariposa	Wawona; 37°32′19″N 119°39′17″W	1868, 1878, 1956	138 feet (42 m)	South Fork, Merced River	Yosemite National Park	Modified queen	
Zane's Ranch Covered Bridge	Zane's Ranch Covered Bridge	Humboldt	Rosewood; 40°43′4″N 124°10′8″W	1937	52 feet (16 m)	Elk River		Queen	

== See also ==
- List of bridges on the National Register of Historic Places in California
- List of covered bridges in the United States
- World Guide to Covered Bridges
