= California Powder Works =

American explosive powder manufacturing company

Coordinates: 37°00′29″N 122°02′28″W

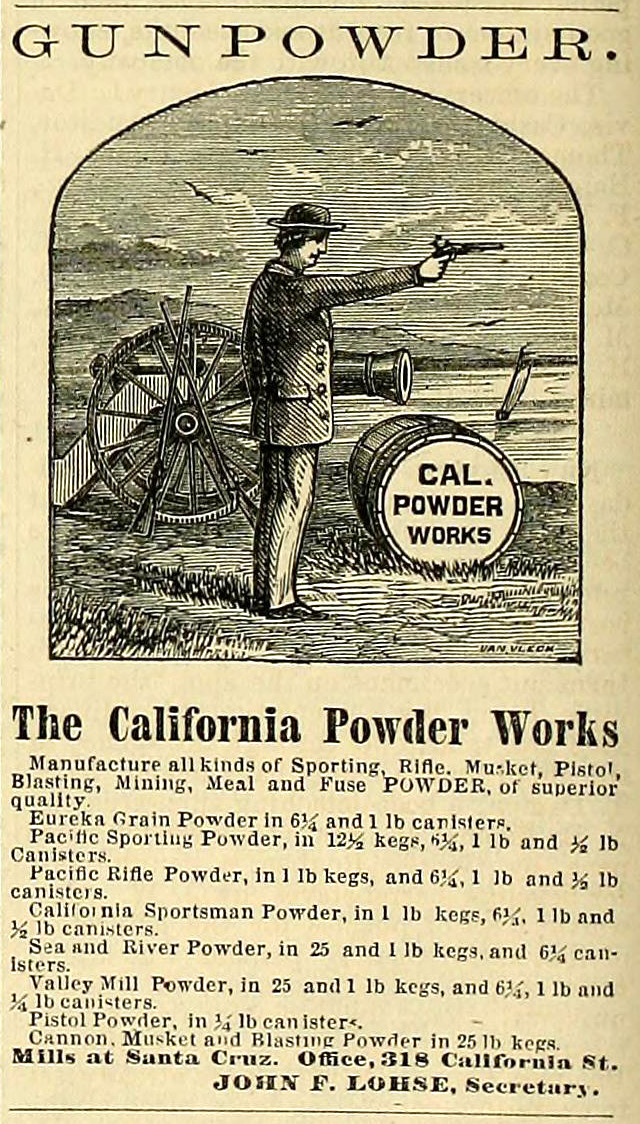
1868 advertisement in a mining newspaper for the California Powder Works

California Powder Works (1861–1914) was the first American explosive powder manufacturing company west of the Rocky Mountains. When the outbreak of the Civil War cut off supplies of gunpowder to California's mining and road-building industries, a local manufacturer was needed. Originally located near Santa Cruz, California, the company was incorporated in 1861 and began manufacturing gunpowder in May 1864. For 50 years, it was a major employer in the county, employing between 150 and 275 men. The powder works was located on a flat adjacent to the San Lorenzo River, three miles upstream of Santa Cruz, which is now the Masonic residential community of Paradise Park, California.

== Facilities at Santa Cruz ==
A dam was built on the San Lorenzo River upstream of the powder works on what is now Henry Cowell Redwoods State Park. A 4 by 6 feet (1.2 m × 1.8 m) tunnel 1,200 feet (370 m) long was dug in 1863 to bring water from the dam through the powder works. Water powered powder mill machinery and was used to dissolve and purify the crude potassium nitrate from Chile. Water was distributed through the powder works by a system of flumes later dismantled when electricity became available to power the wheel mills. Charcoal was manufactured locally using redwood fuel to char willow, madrone and alder. To facilitate transport and shipping, the company built a bridge across the river (the first bridge can be seen in an early panoramic lithograph, viewable online) and purchased a wharf off the main Santa Cruz beach.

The first bridge collapsed in 1871 and was replaced the following year by the covered bridge (now a National Historic Landmark) still in use today built by the Pacific Bridge Company. The wharf was used to receive shipments of potassium nitrate and sulfur from Sicily. Horse-drawn wagons moved raw materials and gunpowder between the wharf and the powder works until the South Pacific Coast Railroad was built. The powder works wharf was unused after 1882 when railroad freight rates encouraged use of wharves in San Francisco Bay. A railroad wharf constructed near the powder works wharf in 1875 was made available for powder works freight until at least 1892 and was not demolished until 1922. Two Victorian mansions were built on a bluff overlooking the powder works as homes for the powder works superintendents. Company housing was available for powder mill workers, and a school opened nearby for their children.

California Powder Works began producing smokeless powder for firearms ammunition in the early 1890s. Peyton Powder, prepared at Santa Cruz under the direction of assistant superintendent William Peyton, had an unusual addition of ammonium picrate to the conventional double-base formulation of nitrocellulose and nitroglycerine. Peyton Powder was selected by the United States Army in 1893 for early cartridges for the new Krag–Jørgensen service rifle. The powder works also produced CPW Smokeless powder and loaded shotgun ammunition marketed as Native Son Cartridges after the army adopted W.A. powder in 1896 to avoid cartridge case corrosion caused by picric acid in the Peyton Powder.

California Powder Works manufactured powder for naval artillery. Initial production was prismatic brown powder, and the works later obtained a license to produce The United States Navy's patented nitrocellulose smokeless powder. Both powders were used by the Pacific Fleet and the Asiatic fleet, and for Pacific harbor and coast defense. The powder works operated a proving ground at Santa Cruz beginning 1892 using guns provided by the United States Inspector of Ordnance. Individual powder lots were test fired in the guns for which they were intended, including a 57mm QF 6-pounder Hotchkiss, a 6"/45 caliber Quick-Fire Rifle Model 1897, and an 8"/32 caliber Breech-Loading Rifle Model 1888.

== Manufacture of dynamite at Hercules ==
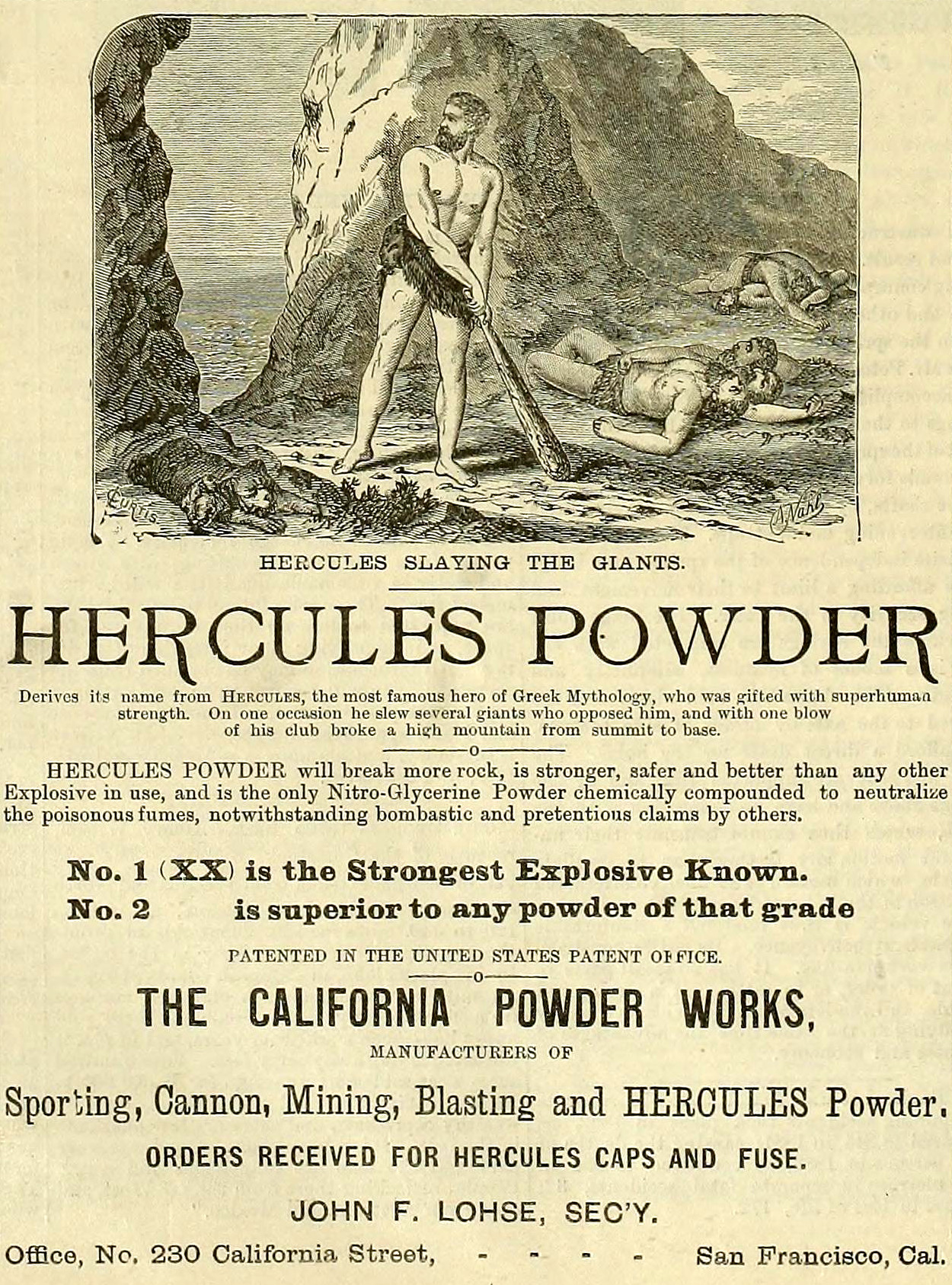
1883 advertisement for Hercules Powder.

Shortly after the invention of dynamite by Alfred Nobel in 1867, the newly-formed Giant Powder Company of San Francisco acquired the exclusive rights to manufacture and sell it in the U.S.

A special formulation of dynamite was patented in 1874 by J. W. Willard, superintendent of the California Powder Works in Santa Cruz. He called his invention "Hercules powder", a competitive jab at rival Giant Powder Company, as the mythological Hercules was known as a giant slayer.

The California Powder Works thereafter became the only manufacturer of Hercules powder. In 1877, J.W. Willard moved to Cleveland, Ohio to oversee the opening of a new California Powder Works plant there, dedicated to the manufacture of Hercules powder. In 1881, the California Powder Works moved its Hercules powder manufacturing in California to a new site along the northeast shore of San Francisco Bay. The company town that grew up around the facility became known as "Hercules", later (1900) incorporated as Hercules, California.

After initial purchases in 1868, DuPont had obtained 43% interest in California Powder Works by 1876. In 1882, thanks to their interlocking ownership interests with the California Powder Works by that time, the DuPont corporation and Laflin & Rand Powder Company acquired the rights to manufacture Hercules powder and incorporated the Hercules Powder Company for that purpose. In 1904, Du Pont dissolved this first Hercules Powder Company as part of its ongoing effort to consolidate the many explosives manufacturers that it controlled. California Powder Works was likewise dissolved on January 1, 1907. Thereafter, its facilities were operated under the DuPont name.

Explosive powder manufacturing was an extremely dangerous endeavor at the time, and uncontrolled explosions were frequent. Hercules's isolated location at the time, plus its proximity to rail and water transportation along San Pablo Bay, made it an ideal choice. The explosives manufactured at Hercules played a significant and decisive role in the United States Army's efforts to contain the fires started by the 1906 San Francisco earthquake, as recounted by General Funston.

In 1911, the United States won a lawsuit that it had brought against the Du Pont corporation under the Sherman Antitrust Act. The U.S. Circuit Court in Delaware found that Du Pont had been operating an unlawful monopoly, and ordered a breakup of its explosives and gunpowder manufacturing business. The breakup resulted in the creation of two new companies in 1912, Atlas Powder Company and a second Hercules Powder Company.

The new Hercules Powder Company contributed significantly to the production of explosives during both World Wars. By the Second World War, the plant had diversified to produce fertilizers and other chemical products. Eventually the facility was out-competed by foreign manufacturers, and the plant was closed in 1976. However, by this time the surrounding area was experiencing rapid growth as the commuter belt moved further outward from San Francisco. By the mid-1970s, home construction companies began to build new subdivisions and changed Hercules into the residential suburb as it was known up until the late 1990s. Back in the 1970s, Hercules was one of the first cities in the United States to develop a comprehensive Noise Element of the General Plan. This work included the production of noise contour maps for all major highways and arterial roads, as well as a citywide mitigation plan. Considerable study has been made of the heavy metal lead accumulated as upper layer soil contamination from prior air pollution smokestack emissions from the California Powder Works operations from this era.

== End of Santa Cruz operations ==
The great explosion of 1898 started in the smokeless powder plant at 5:15 PM on April 26. Santa Cruz was rocked by a series of heavy explosions which killed 13 men at the powder works and injured 25 more. Windows were broken in Santa Cruz, and flaming debris fell on Mission Hill. Many buildings used to house company employees were set afire and a community effort was required by residents of Santa Cruz to prevent fires from reaching powder magazines closer to the city. The explosion caused apprehension among Santa Cruz residents about the safety of operating the powder works so close to the city. Santa Cruz County closed the powder works school and required powder works employee housing facilities to be vacated.

California Powder Works became a DuPont subsidiary in 1903, and operated under the DuPont name after 1906. Powder works wharf demolition begun in 1883 was completed before construction of the Neptune Casino at the Santa Cruz Beach Boardwalk in 1904.Upon the breakup of DuPont's control of explosives manufacturing in the United States, the manufacture of blasting explosives was assigned to Atlas Powder Company, while California Powder Works double-base smokeless powder patents were assigned to Hercules Powder Company's smokeless powder manufacturing facility at Kenvil, New Jersey. DuPont retained manufacture of black powder and single base smokeless powders including the powder being manufactured for the United States Navy. When the Panama Canal simplified transport to the Pacific Fleet, DuPont consolidated production facilities in New Jersey and terminated operations at Santa Cruz in 1914.

Powder mill facilities were dismantled, and the property was sold in 1924 to a group of Freemasons who developed a private residential community on the site. The two mansions occupied by powder works superintendents were abandoned and razed in the 1930s.
