= Bucksport =

Bucksport can refer to:

- Bucksport, California
- Bucksport, Maine
  - Bucksport (CDP), Maine
- Bucksport, South Carolina
