= Pacific Electric Railroad Bridge =

- Pacific Electric Railway- El Prado Bridge
- U.S. National Register of Historic Places
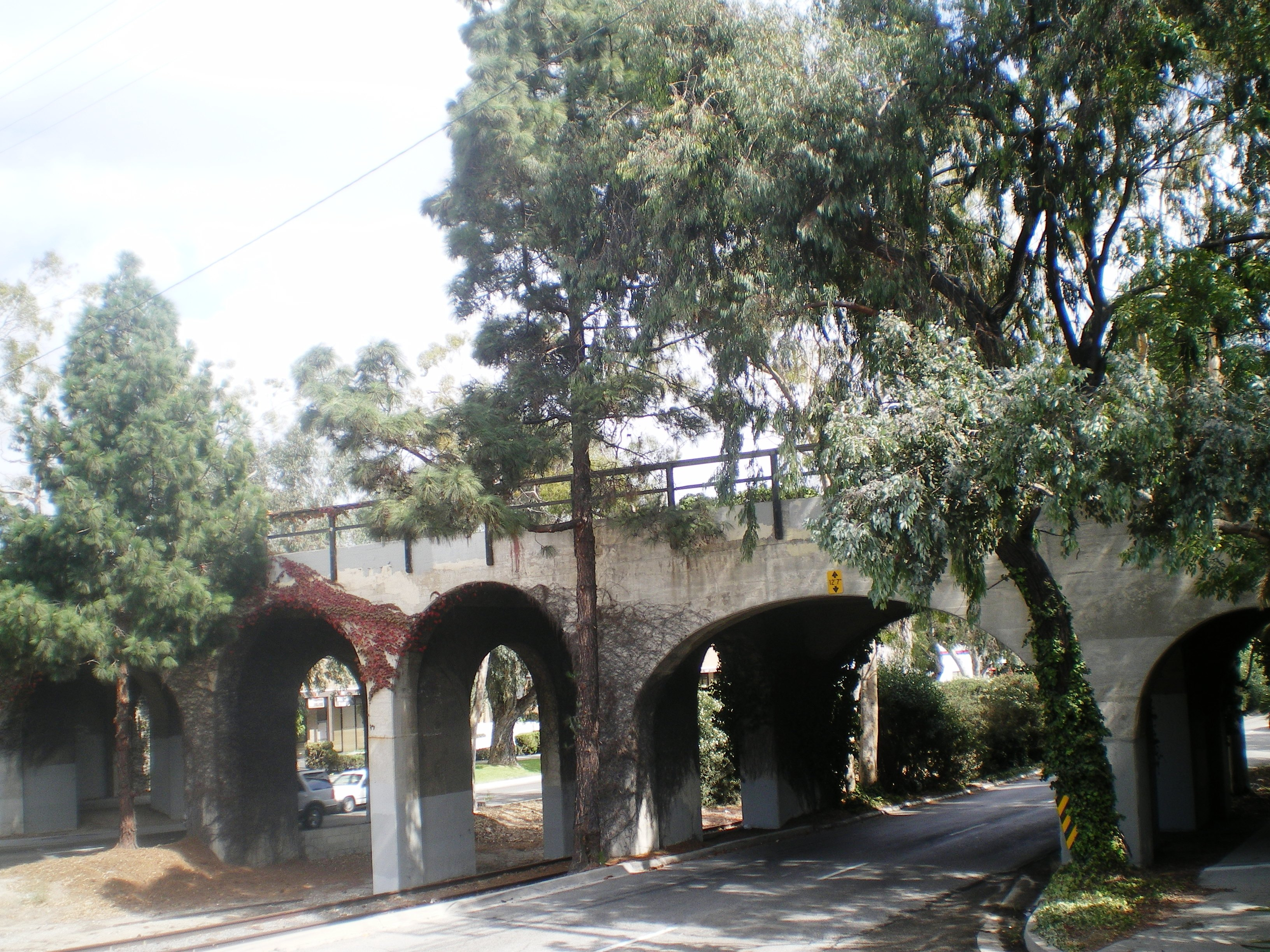

- Location within the Los Angeles metropolitan area
- Location: Torrance Boulevard and Bow Avenue; Torrance, California
- Coordinates: 33°50′15.3″N 118°18′42.1″W
- Built: 1913
- Architect: Irving Gill; Pacific Electric Railway
- Architectural style: Modern Movement
- NRHP reference No.: 89000854
- Added to NRHP: July 13, 1989

The Pacific Electric Railroad Bridge (also the Southern Pacific Railroad Bridge and officially named the Pacific Electric Railway-El Prado Bridge) is a historic double-tracked arch bridge in Torrance, California, U.S. It spans Torrance Boulevard at Bow Avenue, a short distance west of Western Avenue. It was once part of the north/south San Pedro via Gardena Line of the Pacific Electric Railway, that agency's first interurban line to San Pedro.

After splitting off to the east from the Union Tool Company plant which was once a short distance south of the bridge, the line terminated at the new Torrance plant of the Llewellyn Iron Works which was opened in 1916 (and was since 1923 for most of its life a Columbia Steel Company plant). It ran up and over the railroad's east/west Torrance local line on a viaduct and is the only part of the PE which crossed itself in such a manner. This was due to the area's geography; simply building a spur off of the main line would have resulted in too steep a climb to the steel mill. The steel mill has since been demolished to make way for the national headquarters of American Honda Motor Company, but the once double-tracked Torrance line was reballasted and rerailed with used welded rail in 2003 and is still in use for local runs by the Union Pacific Railroad. Gone too are the Pacific Electric's Torrance shops at the western branch of the split, now the site of an industrial park still serviced by the aforementioned local line.

Designed by Irving Gill and built in 1913 as part of the original layout of the city as determined by Jared Sidney Torrance and Frederick Law Olmsted Jr., the bridge became the city's second entry in the National Register of Historic Places on July 13, 1989 after Torrance High School. It is also listed with the California Office of Historic Preservation.

The Pacific Electric Railway- El Prado Bridge, was dedicated as a Local Engineering Landmark by the American Society of Civil Engineers in 2013.

Though trackage, turnouts and remnants of a switch remain on the bridge, it is no longer in use, and the right-of-way at either end has been redeveloped. Nevertheless, the Pacific Electric Railroad Bridge has become a symbol of the city as part of the Torrance Police Department's logo as of January 1, 2000, only the third such change in the department's history.

== See also ==
- List of bridges on the National Register of Historic Places in California
- National Register of Historic Places listings in Los Angeles County, California
