= California Powder Works Bridge =

- U.S. National Register of Historic Places
- U.S. National Historic Landmark
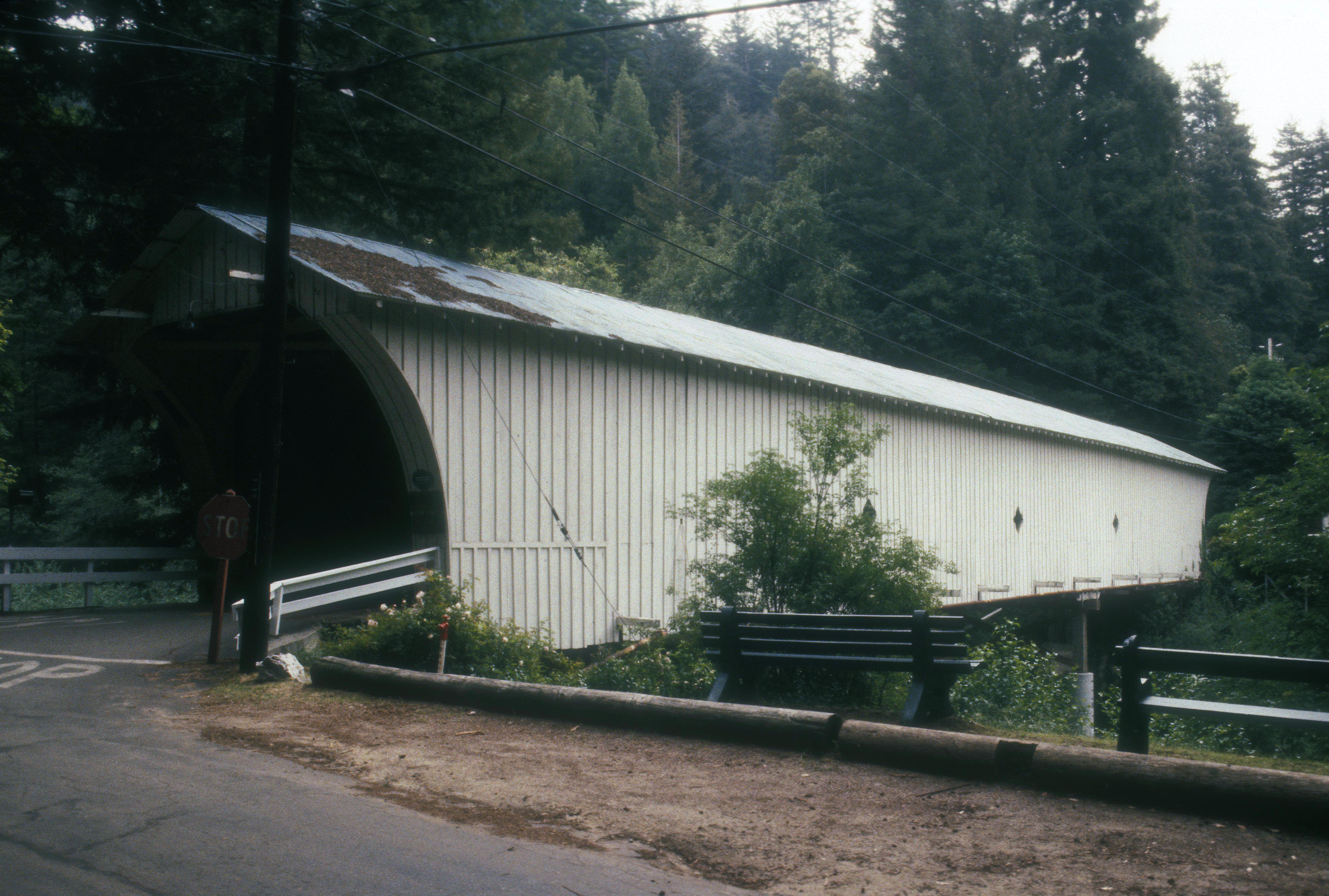

- Location within California Location within the United States
- Nearest city: Santa Cruz, California
- Coordinates: 37°0′38″N 122°2′38″W
- NRHP reference No.: 15000279

Significant dates
- Added to NRHP: February 27, 2015
- Designated NHL: February 27, 2015

The California Powder Works Bridge is a historic covered bridge in Santa Cruz, California. It is a Smith truss bridge, built across the San Lorenzo River in 1872 by the California Powder Works, an explosives manufacturer whose factory complex stood on the river banks. The bridge was designated a National Historic Landmark in 2015 as one of the best-preserved national examples of the Smith truss. It is owned and maintained by the Paradise Park Masonic Club, and is open to pedestrian and vehicular traffic, with a posted weight limit of 5 tons.

== Description and history ==
The California Powder Works Bridge is located about 2 miles (3.2 km) north of downtown Santa Cruz, spanning the San Lorenzo River just downstream of Henry Cowell Redwoods State Park. The bridge carries Keystone Way, a private road in the residential development known as the Paradise Park Masonic Club. It is a single span, with a total structure length of 180 feet (55 m) and a span length of 163 feet (50 m). Its total width is 30 feet (9.1 m), and it has a roadway width of 19 feet 3 inches (5.87 m). Its trusses are built out of Douglas fir, and its roof is corrugated metal. The exterior is clad in vertical board-and-batten siding.

The bridge was constructed by the Pacific Bridge Company, its major elements manufactured at a plant in Alameda, and was installed in 1872. It was built for the California Powder Works, whose main manufacturing plant was on the east side of the river. The company operated on that site between 1863 and 1914, after which the site was largely demolished and abandoned. The property was purchased by a Masonic organization from Fresno, and developed as a summer colony they dubbed "Paradise Park".

The bridge is one of 23 known historic (pre-1955) examples of a Smith truss remaining in the United States, and is the longest and among the best-preserved of those, as determined by a nationwide survey conducted by the National Park Service. This truss type was marketed on a nationwide scale by the Smith Bridge Company, and was briefly competitive with iron bridges, which were coming to predominate in the landscape.

== See also ==
- List of bridges documented by the Historic American Engineering Record in California
- List of bridges on the National Register of Historic Places in California
- List of covered bridges in California
- List of National Historic Landmarks in California
- National Register of Historic Places listings in Santa Cruz County, California
