= Rancho del Río Estanislao =

Mexican land grant in California

Coordinates: 37.850°N 120.720°W

Rancho del Río Estanislao (also called Ranchería Del Rio Estanislao) was a 48,887-acre (197.84 km^{2}) Mexican land grant in present-day Stanislaus County and Calaveras County, California given in 1843 by Governor Manuel Micheltorena to Francisco Rico and José Castro. The grant was located on the north side of the Stanislaus River, which was called Rio Estanislao during the Mexican era, and the grant encompassed present-day Knights Ferry.

== History ==
Francisco Rico and Jose Antonio Castro were granted the eleven square league Rancho Del Rio Estanislao in 1843.

With the cession of California to the United States following the Mexican-American War, the 1848 Treaty of Guadalupe Hidalgo provided that the land grants would be honored. As required by the Land Act of 1851, a claim for Rancho Del Rio Estanislao was filed with the Public Land Commission in 1853, and the grant was patented to Francisco Rico and José Castro in 1863.

Rico and Castro sold to William Hicks, Abraham Schell, and James C. Stubbins. Abraham Schell, a lawyer, came to Knights Ferry in 1856. He built his home the Abraham Schell House in present-day Knights Ferry, California where it currently stands. He purchased three and a half square leagues of the Rancheria del Rio Estanislao in 1863. Schell and his partner, George H. Krause, started the Red Mountain Winery.
