= Knight's Ferry Bridge =

- U.S. National Register of Historic Places
- U.S. National Historic Landmark
- U.S. Historic district – Contributing property
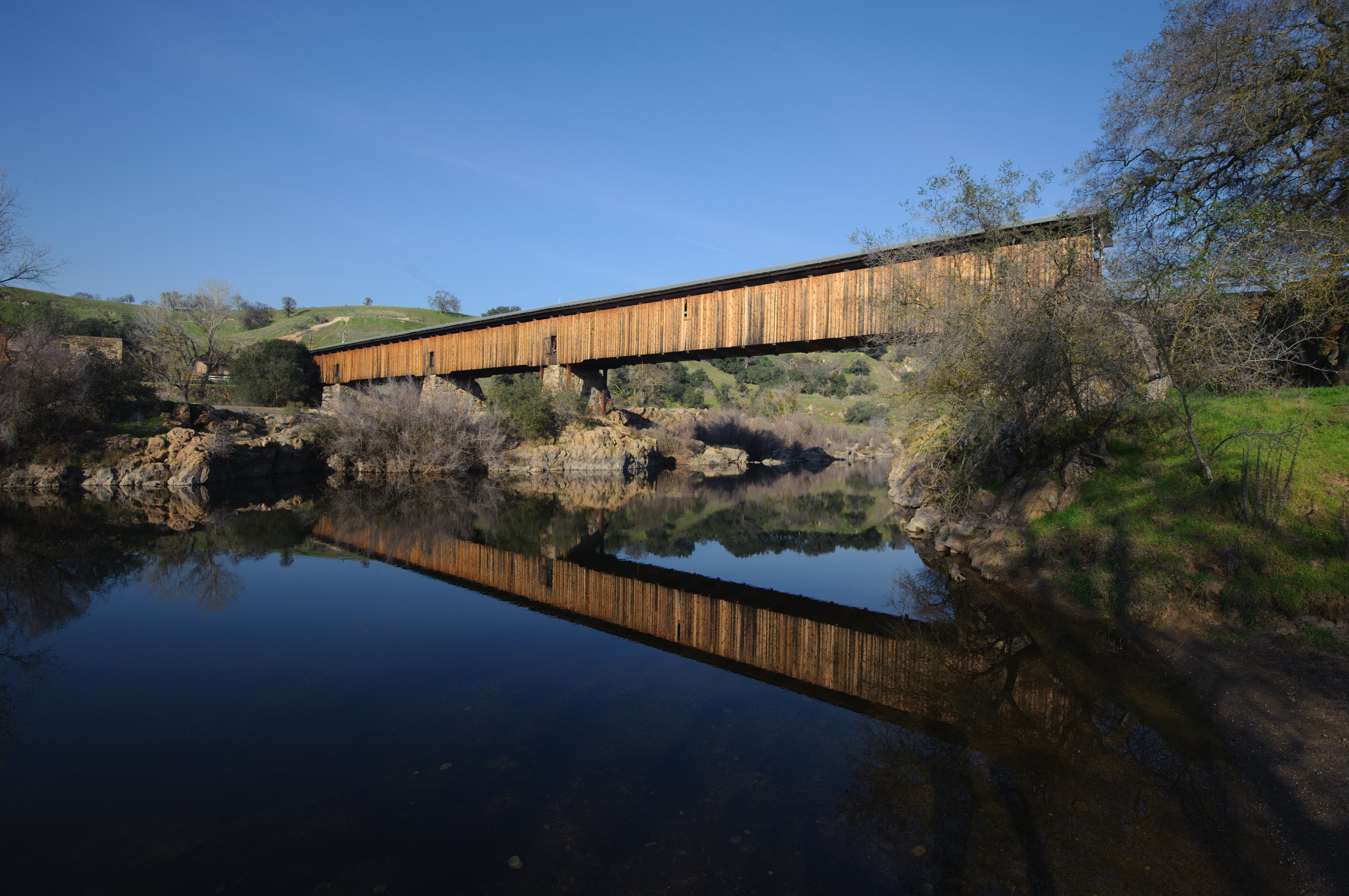

- Location within California Location within the United States
- Location: Spanning Stanislaus River at bypassed section of Sonora Road, approximately 0.75 mile north of CA 108/120, Knight's Ferry, California
- Area: less than one acre
- Architectural style: Howe truss bridge
- Part of: Knights Ferry (ID75000490)
- NRHP reference No.: 12001014

Significant dates
- Added to NRHP: October 16, 2012
- Designated NHL: October 16, 2012
- Designated CP: April 23, 1975

The Knight's Ferry Bridge is a historic covered bridge spanning the Stanislaus River at Knights Ferry, California. Built in 1863, it is one of the best-preserved 19th-century wood-iron Howe truss bridges to survive. It was designated a U.S. National Historic Landmark in 2012.

== Description and history ==
The Knight's Ferry Bridge stands at the eastern edge of the small community of Knights Ferry, spanning the Stanislaus River a short distance upriver from the modern Sonora Road bridge. The bridge is almost 379 feet (116 m) long, with a total of four spans set on stone abutments and piers. In addition to spanning the river, the bridge crosses a historic millrace north of the river. The bridge sections consist of Howe trusses formed out of wooden planks bolted together, with wrought iron tension rods, all joined by wrought iron bearing blocks. The exterior of the bridge is finished in vertical board siding, with a metal roof.

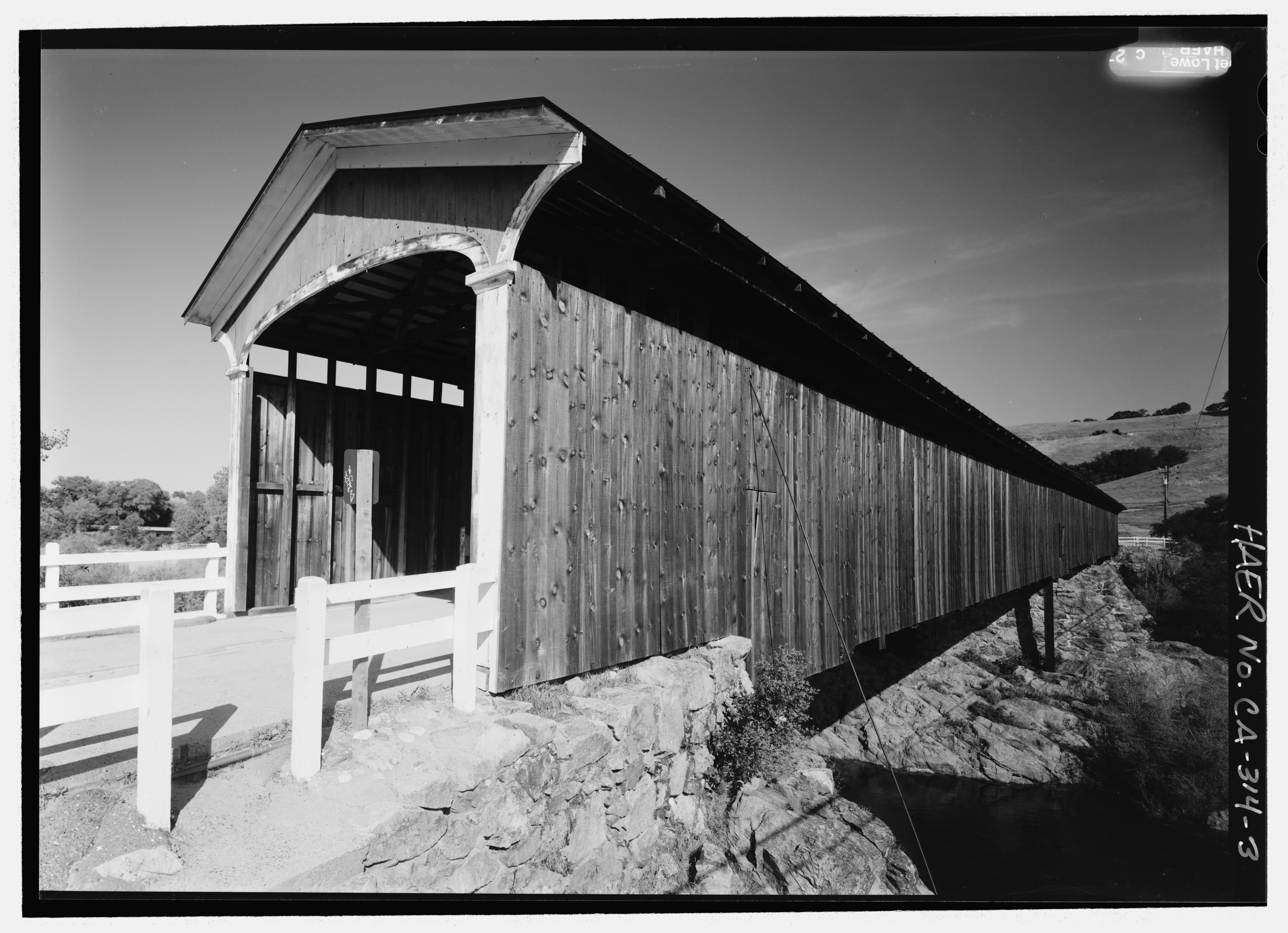
2004 HAER photo

The bridge, the second to stand on the site, was built in 1862–63, after the first bridge (built 1856) was swept away during the Great Flood of 1862. Because of this flood, the new bridge was built on higher piers. The bridge was for a long time known as the longest covered bridge west of the Mississippi River, and since the 2011 destruction of Old Blenheim Bridge in New York State, which had approximately the same length, it is the third -longest covered bridge in the United States, behind the Smolen-Gulf covered bridge in Ohio, and the Cornish-Windsor Covered Bridge in New Hampshire and Vermont

It was documented by the Historic American Buildings Survey and by the Historic American Engineering Record. In addition to its status as a National Historic Landmark, it is also listed on the National Register of Historic Places as a contributing structure in the Knight's Ferry historic district.

== See also ==
- List of bridges documented by the Historic American Engineering Record in California
- List of bridges on the National Register of Historic Places in California
- List of covered bridges in California
- List of National Historic Landmarks in California
- National Register of Historic Places listings in Stanislaus County, California
