= Abraham Schell House =

Notable house in California

Coordinates: 37°49′8″N 120°40′23″W

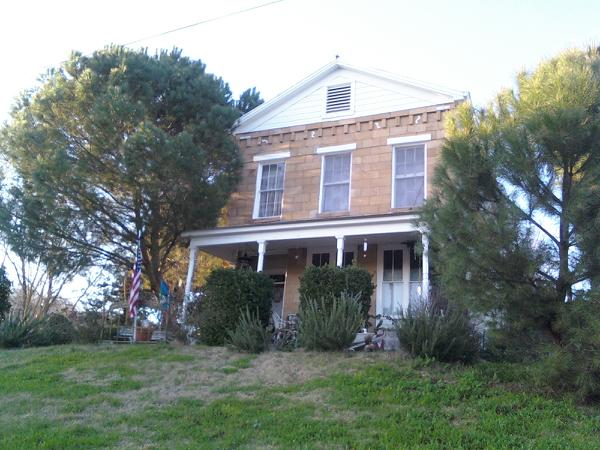
- Interactive map of the Abraham Schell House area

General information
- Location: 17506 Sonora Road; Knights Ferry, California, United States
- Construction started: 1856
- Client: Abraham Schell

Technical details
- Size: Neoclassical

The Abraham Schell House is a historic two-story house located in Knights Ferry, California. It was first built out of sandstone in 1856 for Abraham and Catherine Schell, owners of the Rancho del Río Estanislao.
