= Bucksport, California =

Bucksport Kucuwalik Buck's Port
- Unincorporated community
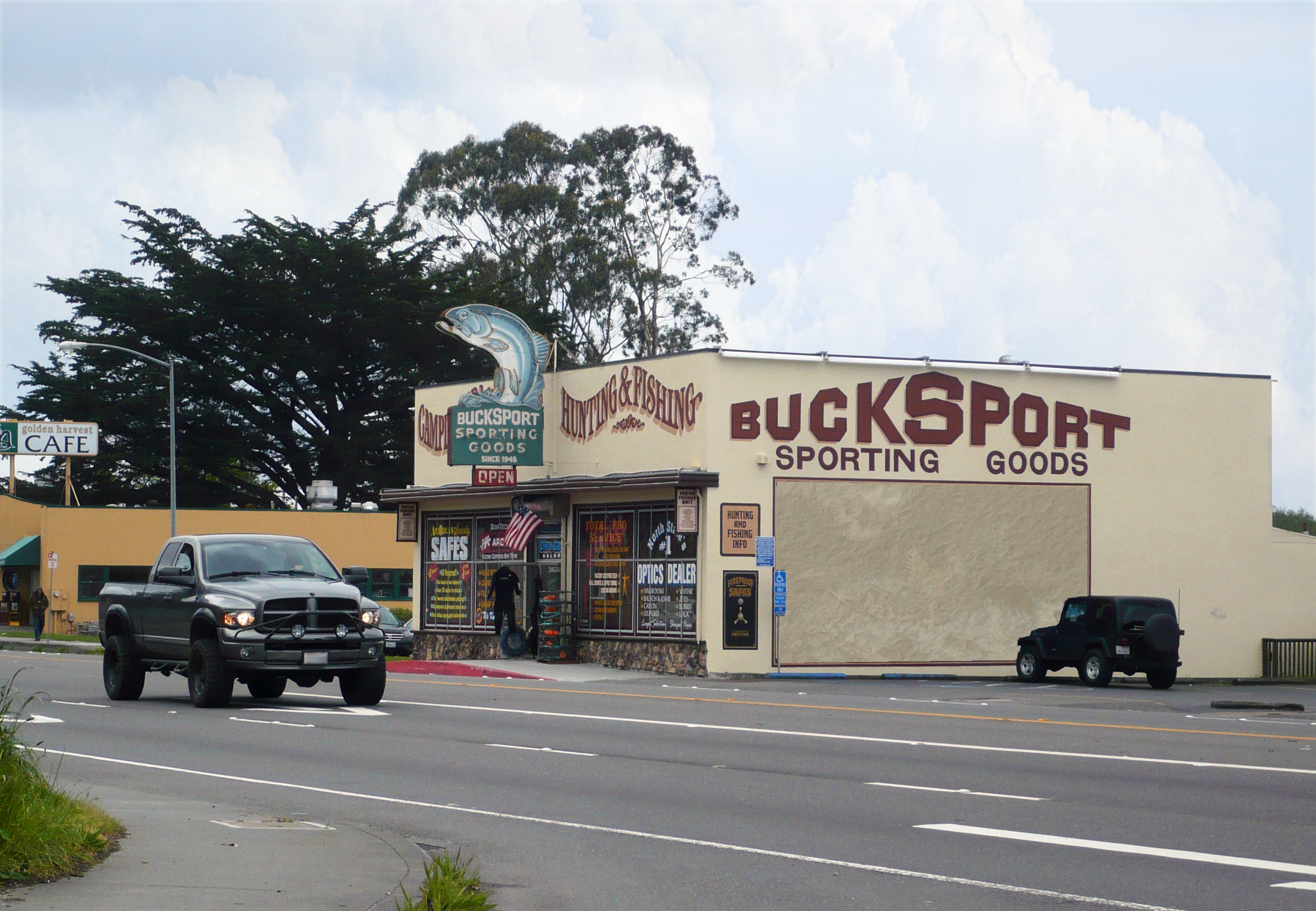
- Bucksport is now a part of Eureka, California.

- Location in California
- Coordinates: 40°46′30″N 124°11′32″W
- Country: United States
- State: California
- County: Humboldt
- Established: 1850
- Elevation: 16 ft (5 m)

Bucksport (also, Buck's Port) was a town in Humboldt County, California, United States. The original location was 2.5 miles (4 km) southwest of downtown Eureka, on Humboldt Bay, approximately 5 miles (8 km) northeast of the entrance at an elevation of 16 feet (4.9 m). Prior to American settlement a Wiyot village named Kucuwalik stood here.

The townsite was laid out in 1850 by David A. Buck, who was a member of the Josiah Gregg party that explored the bay in 1849. A post office operated at Bucksport from 1855 to 1863.

Fort Humboldt was founded on the bluff over Bucksport in 1853, under the command of Brevet Lieutenant Colonel Robert C. Buchanan.

Bucksport was a separate community in the 19th century, before better port facilities and political dominance gave the then northern town of Eureka predominance. The town disappeared by 1870 with the area that once comprised the town remaining only as a neighborhood of southern Eureka.

== Bucksport and Elk River Railroad Company ==
John Dolbeer and William Carson were among the most successful of the early sawmill operators on Humboldt Bay. Their Dolbeer and Carson partnership built a standard gauge railroad from Bucksport south along the Elk River in 1885 to bring redwood logs 12 miles (19 km) from interior forests to a log dump on Humboldt Bay. From the log dump, these logs could be floated to bayside sawmills. Three sawmills depended upon railroad deliveries by 1887.

Noah Falk established the company town of Falk around his Elk River Mill and Lumber Company sawmill near the inland end of the line. Dolbeer and Carson had cut most of their Elk River timber by 1895, but the railroad remained Falk's primary means of shipping lumber and receiving supplies. Elk River Mill and Lumber Company built some logging branches for operation of two 0-4-0 tank locomotives built by Marshutz & Cantrell. These locomotives have been preserved at Fort Humboldt State Historic Park. Railroad operations at Falk were improved by purchase of 24-ton Heisler locomotive #1546 in 1927. When the Falk sawmill ceased operations in 1937, the Heisler was sold to Mutual Plywood Company where it was repowered with a diesel engine, and has been preserved in that form.

A branch line built in 1904 north from Bucksport to Holmes Mill in present-day Eureka was another source of revenue; but the railroad was substantially revitalized by construction of a branch to Camp Carson in 1931. The line was incorporated as the Bucksport and Elk River Railroad Company on 14 May 1932, with J.M. Carson as president. The original Baldwin locomotives were retired in 1934 and replaced by the Dolbeer and Carson Lumber Company locomotives listed below. Timberlands containing the railroad were sold to the Pacific Lumber Company (PALCO) in 1950. PALCO operated the line until 15 January 1953, when it was replaced by log truck roads feeding PALCO's Yager Creek log deck. The rails were scrapped in April 1953, but locomotive number 5 was placed on display at Scotia. Locomotive number 3 was sold to the Stockton Terminal and Eastern Railroad, and subsequently preserved by the California State Railroad Museum.

=== Locomotives ===
Road Number	Builder	Type	Works Number	Year built	Weight (lbs)	Notes
No. 1	Baldwin Locomotive Works	2-4-2 tank locomotive	#9780	1889	75,000	Built as Southern Pacific # 383 > # 1158 > # 1005; became Humboldt Northern # 1; scrapped
No. 2	Baldwin Locomotive Works	2-6-2	#25503	1904	108,500	Built for display at Lewis and Clark Centennial Exposition; became Humboldt Northern # 2
No. 3	Baldwin Locomotive Works	2-6-2	#55248	1922	124,000	Built as Humboldt Northern # 3; preserved by California State Railroad Museum
No. 4	Lima Locomotive Works	3-truck Shay locomotive	#3349	1931	187,500	Built for Bucksport and Elk River RR; sold to Alberni Pacific Lumber Company of British Columbia in November 1937; scrapped in 1953.
No. 5	Heisler Locomotive Works	2-truck Heisler locomotive	#1446	1920	72,000	Built as Mount Tamalpais and Muir Woods Railway # 9; sold in 1924 for $9,750 to become Siskiyou Lumber Co. # 1 of Macdoel, CA; preserved on display in Scotia, CA
