= Alexander-Acacia Bridge =

Historic bridge in California, United States

- U.S. National Register of Historic Places

- Location within San Francisco Bay Area Location within California Location within the United States
- Location: Alexander Ave. between Acacia and Monte Vista Aves., Larkspur, California
- Coordinates: 37°55′49″N 122°31′51″W
- Area: less than one acre
- Built: 1925
- Built by: Frank Oglesby
- NRHP reference No.: 84000903
- Added to NRHP: January 5, 1984

The Alexander-Acacia Bridge (also known as the Alexander Avenue Bridge or Bridge No. 27C-150) is a concrete pony arch bridge in Larkspur, California, United States. Constructed by Frank Oglesby, it was completed in 1927 and crosses a former railroad line. It is listed on the National Register of Historic Places.

== Description ==
The Alexander-Acacia Bridge is part of Alexander Avenue between Acacia and Monte Vista avenues in Larkspur, California, United States. The bridge has the internal ID of Bridge No. 27C-150. It carries two lanes of traffic above what was originally a railroad line, operated by the Northwestern Pacific Railroad. The bridge measures 29 feet (8.8 m) wide and 163.5 feet (49.8 m) long in total. The deck is divided into seven slabs made of reinforced concrete. The joints between each slab are supported by groups of two or three columns each. A pair of reinforced concrete through arches cross the former railroad right-of-way at a right angle. The roadway itself is made of asphalt concrete and is about 20 feet (6.1 m) wide.

== History ==
The Alexander Avenue Bridge was built by town engineer Frank Oglesby as part of a grade crossing elimination project along the Northwestern Pacific Railroad line. On June 3, 1925, Oglesby was ordered to create plans for a bridge connecting Alexander and Acacia avenues on opposite sides of the railroad, replacing an old wooden bridge. It cost $57,000 to build, of which the California State Railroad Commission mandated that Northwestern Pacific pay $12,507. The railroad refused to pay until a United States circuit court ruled in 1929 that the railroad had to fund its share of the bridge.

The tracks were eventually removed and a bike path built on their right-of-way. The bridge was added to the National Register of Historic Places on January 5, 1984. At the time of its listing, it was one of five reinforced concrete through arches known to exist in California. By the early 21st century, the bridge was deemed seismically deficient and needed over $1,4 million in repairs. The Larkspur council narrowly voted in 2009 to preserve the bridge, rather than spending $2.1 million on a new bridge on the site. The Hanna Group renovated the bridge as part of the seismic retrofit, and the span reopened in 2013.

== See also ==
- National Register of Historic Places listings in Marin County, California
- List of bridges on the National Register of Historic Places in California
