= Swartz Creek Bridge on Aetna Springs Road =

- U.S. National Register of Historic Places
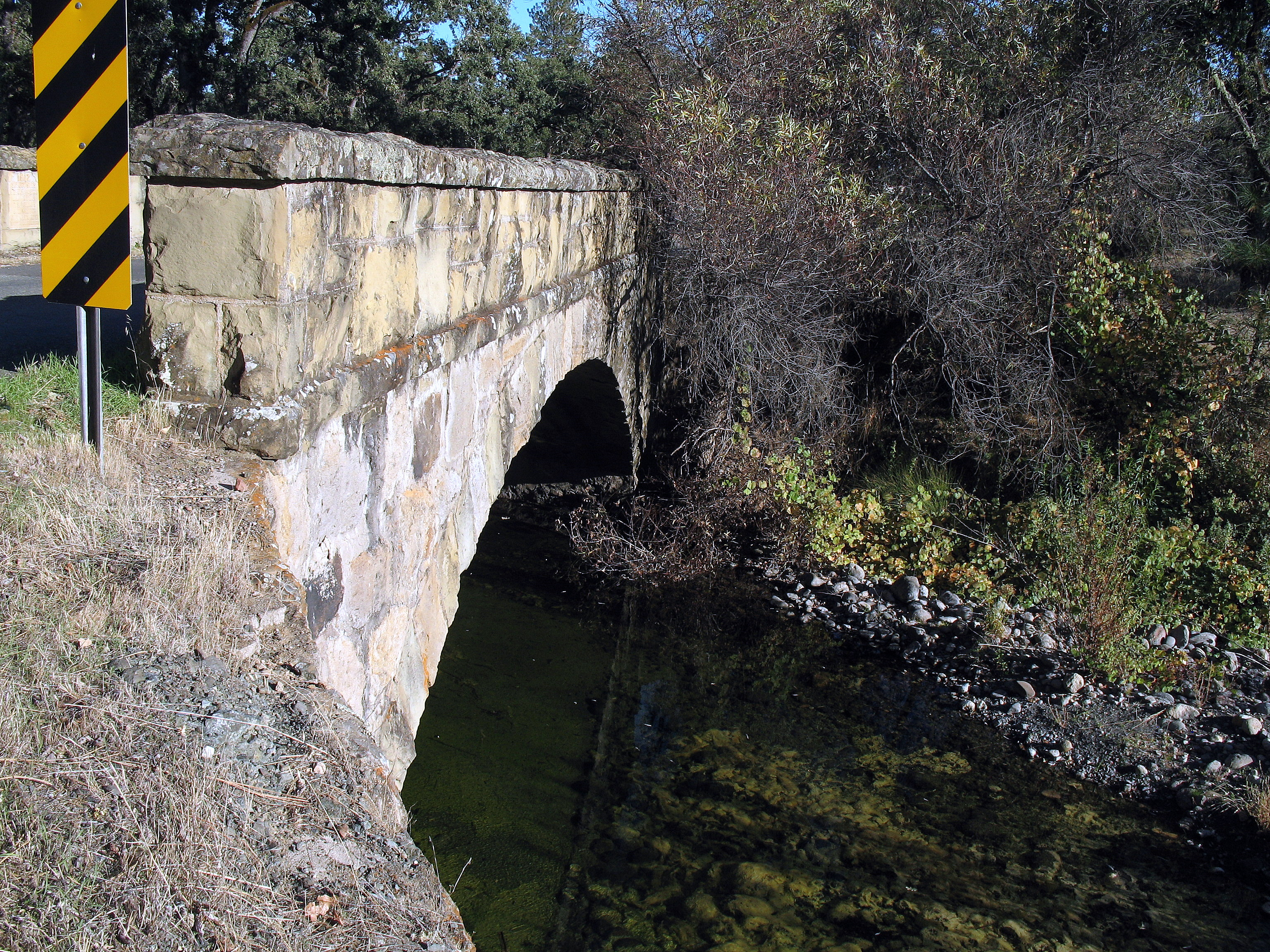

- Location within California
- Nearest city: Aetna Springs, California
- Coordinates: 38°39′12″N 122°28′32″W
- Area: less than one acre
- Built: 1912
- Built by: Martini, A.C.
- Architect: Buckman, O.H.
- Architectural style: masonry arch bridge
- MPS: Highway Bridges of California MPS
- NRHP reference No.: 05000780
- Added to NRHP: August 5, 2005

The Swartz Creek Bridge on Aetna Springs Road, in Napa County, California near Aetna Springs, California was listed on the National Register of Historic Places in 2005.

It is a single-span masonry arch bridge built in 1912. It has an earth-filled closed spandrel masonry arch, and is built of square cut stone in irregular courses. Its railings are built of the square cut stone. It is a two-lane bridge, 54 feet (16 m) long and 19.5 feet (5.9 m) wide bridge.

It was designed by Napa County Surveyor O.H. Buckman and was built by A.C. Martini, one of many masonry arch bridges built in the county in the late 1800s and early 1900s which survive today, due to the design efforts of Buckman and the availability of high quality stone and skilled stonemasons.

It is located on Aetna Springs Rd., about 0.8 miles (1.3 km) west of Pope Valley Rd.
