= Paradise Park, California =

Paradise Park
- census-designated place
- Position in California.
- Coordinates: 37°00′23″N 122°02′33″W
- Country: United States
- State: California
- County: Santa Cruz

Area
  - Total: 0.278 sq mi (0.721 km^{2})
  - Land: 0.278 sq mi (0.721 km^{2})
  - Water: 0 sq mi (0 km^{2}) 0%
- Elevation: 92 ft (28 m)

Population (2020)
  - Total: 367
  - Density: 1,320/sq mi (509/km^{2})
- Time zone: UTC-8 (Pacific (PST))
  - Summer (DST): UTC-7 (PDT)
- GNIS feature ID: 2583106

Paradise Park is a census-designated place (CDP) in Santa Cruz County, California, United States. Paradise Park sits at an elevation of 92 feet (28 m). The 2020 United States census reported Paradise Park's population was 367, which is down from 389 people in the 2010 census.

Paradise Park is separated from the University of California, Santa Cruz campus by Pogonip Park and Highway 9. It is the site of the 1872 California Powder Works Bridge, one of the best-preserved national examples of a wooden Smith truss covered bridge.

== Geography ==
According to the United States Census Bureau, the CDP covers an area of 0.3 square mile (0.7 km^{2}), all land.

== Demographics ==
Historical population
Census	Pop.	Note	%±
2010	389		—
2020	367		−5.7%
U.S. Decennial Census; 2010

Paradise Park first appeared as a census designated place in the 2010 U.S. census.

=== Racial and ethnic composition ===
Paradise Park CDP, California – Racial and ethnic composition Note: the US Census treats Hispanic/Latino as an ethnic category. This table excludes Latinos from the racial categories and assigns them to a separate category. Hispanics/Latinos may be of any race.
Race / Ethnicity (NH = Non-Hispanic)	Pop 2010	Pop 2020	% 2010	% 2020
White alone (NH)	362	306	93.06%	83.38%
Black or African American alone (NH)	2	0	0.51%	0.00%
Native American or Alaska Native alone (NH)	3	2	0.77%	0.54%
Asian alone (NH)	3	9	0.77%	2.45%
Native Hawaiian or Pacific Islander alone (NH)	0	1	0.00%	0.27%
Other race alone (NH)	0	3	0.00%	0.82%
Mixed race or Multiracial (NH)	4	17	1.03%	4.63%
Hispanic or Latino (any race)	15	29	3.86%	7.90%
Total	389	367	100.00%	100.00%

=== 2020 ===
The 2020 United States census reported that Paradise Park had a population of 367. The population density was 1,320.1 inhabitants per square mile (509.7/km^{2}). The racial makeup of Paradise Park was 311 (84.7%) White, 0 (0.0%) African American, 3 (0.8%) Native American, 9 (2.5%) Asian, 1 (0.3%) Pacific Islander, 8 (2.2%) from other races, and 35 (9.5%) from two or more races. Hispanic or Latino of any race were 29 persons (7.9%).

The whole population lived in households. There were 187 households, out of which 51 (27.3%) had children under the age of 18 living in them, 86 (46.0%) were married-couple households, 17 (9.1%) were cohabiting couple households, 43 (23.0%) had a female householder with no partner present, and 41 (21.9%) had a male householder with no partner present. 43 households (23.0%) were one person, and 22 (11.8%) were one person aged 65 or older. The average household size was 1.96. There were 123 families (65.8% of all households).

The age distribution was 47 people (12.8%) under the age of 18, 31 people (8.4%) aged 18 to 24, 68 people (18.5%) aged 25 to 44, 125 people (34.1%) aged 45 to 64, and 96 people (26.2%) who were 65 years of age or older. The median age was 50.9 years. For every 100 females, there were 106.2 males.

There were 384 housing units at an average density of 1,381.3 units per square mile (533.3 units/km^{2}), of which 187 (48.7%) were occupied. Of these, 160 (85.6%) were owner-occupied, and 27 (14.4%) were occupied by renters.

== History ==
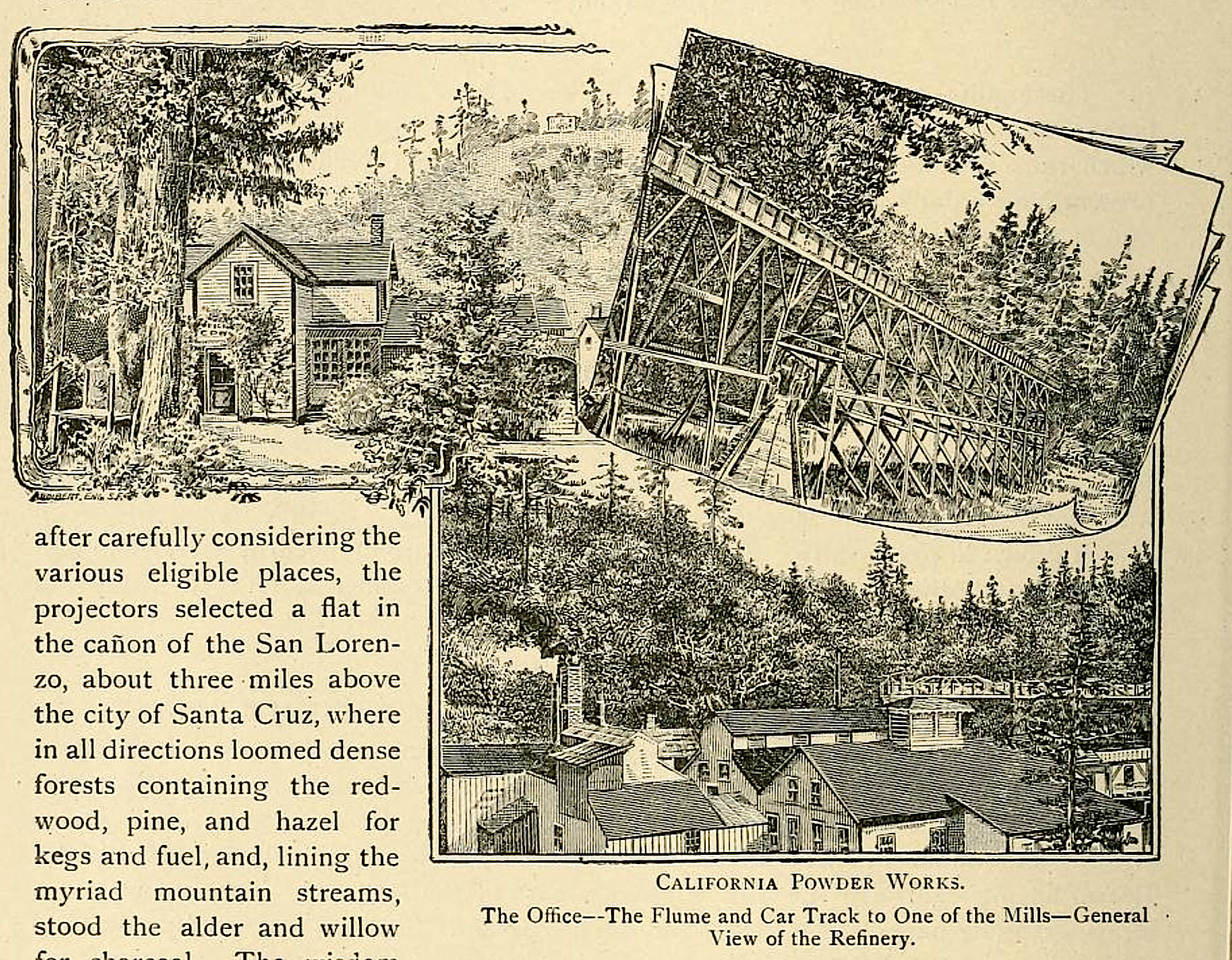
California Powder Works

The California Powder Works was built on the site in 1861 as supplies of explosives from the east were cut off by the Civil War. The works produced black powder, dynamite, and smokeless powders for civilian and military uses, powered by the waters of the San Lorenzo river distributed by a system of flumes from a dam located in what is now Henry Cowell Redwoods State Park.

Lillian Dake Heath had been a school teacher in the Powder Mill Flat (now known as Paradise Park) starting in 1883.

A large explosion on 26 April 1898 killed 13 and injured 25, forcing the abandonment of the on-site employee housing and public school, and soured public opinion on the operation of an explosives works so close to the city of Santa Cruz. The opening of the Panama Canal simplified shipment of powder to the US Navy's Pacific Fleet from factories on the east coast, and the works was abandoned in 1914.

The decaying buildings were demolished and the 138-acre (56 ha) property was put up for sale in 1924, when a group of Freemasons from Fresno, California purchased it for use as a summer retreat. They laid out streets with names related to Freemasonry. The area continues to be under the auspices of the Paradise Park Masonic Club, with homes owned by members.

In August 2020, Paradise Park was put under an evacuation order due to the CZU Lightning Complex fires.
