= Felton Covered Bridge =

Historic bridge in California, USA

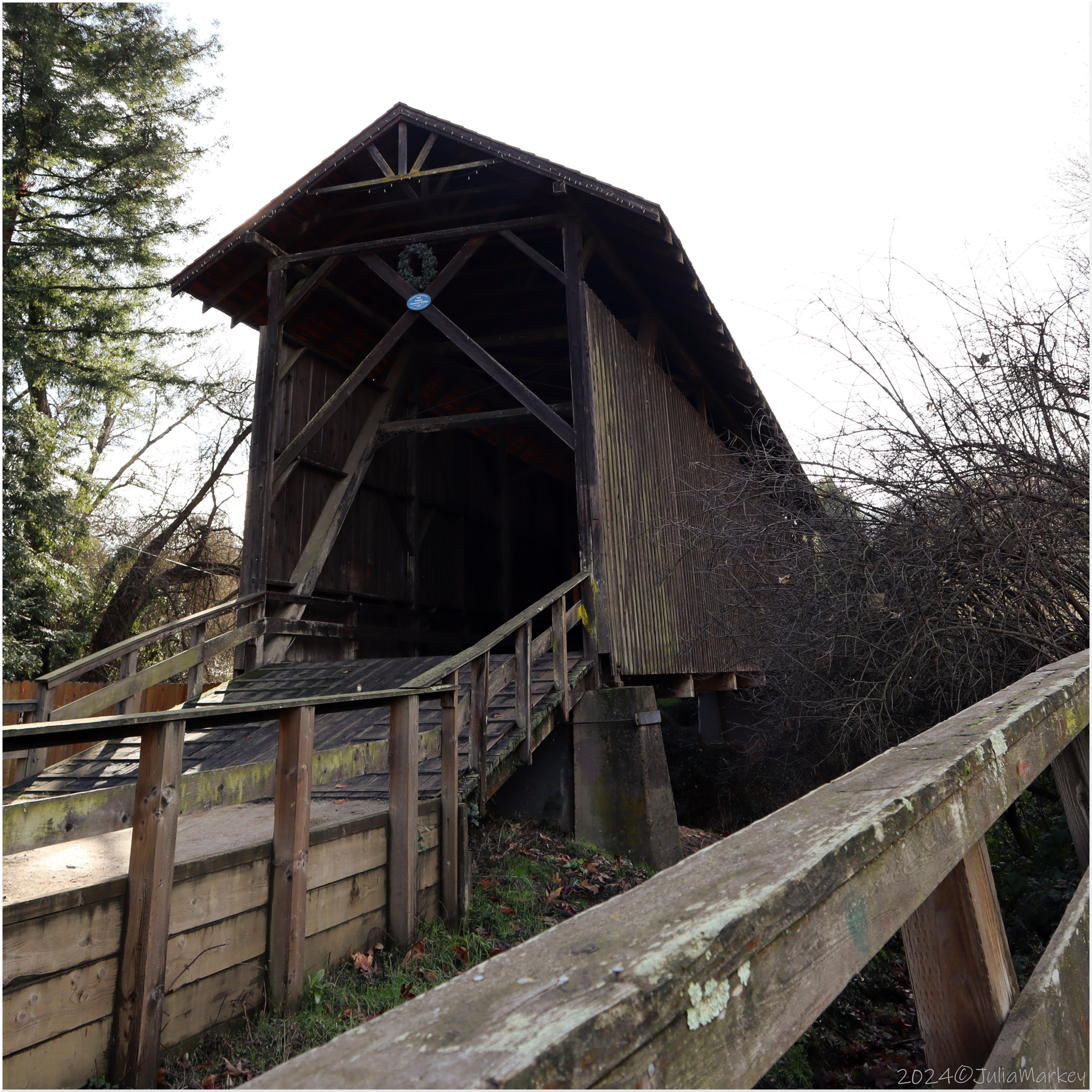
- Coordinates: 37°03′03″N 122°04′15″W
- Crosses: San Lorenzo River
- Locale: Santa Cruz, California, United States
- Official name: Felton Covered Bridge
- Named for: Felton, California
- Maintained by: Santa Cruz County

History
- Constructed by: Pratt Warren
- Built: 1892
- Felton Covered Bridge
- U.S. National Register of Historic Places
- California Historical Landmark
- NRHP reference No.: 73000451
- CHISL No.: 583

Significant dates
- Added to NRHP: June 19, 1973
- Designated CHISL: 1957

Location
- Interactive map of Felton Covered Bridge

The Felton Covered Bridge is a covered bridge over the San Lorenzo River in Felton, Santa Cruz County in the U.S. state of California. Built in 1892, the bridge employs a Brown truss structural system and is approximately 80 feet long. The bridge became a California Historical Landmark in 1957, was placed on the National Register of Historic Places in 1973, and had a major restoration in 1987 after being damaged in storms in the winter of 1982.

It is considered to be the tallest covered bridge in the United States, and was the main entry point for Felton for 45 years.

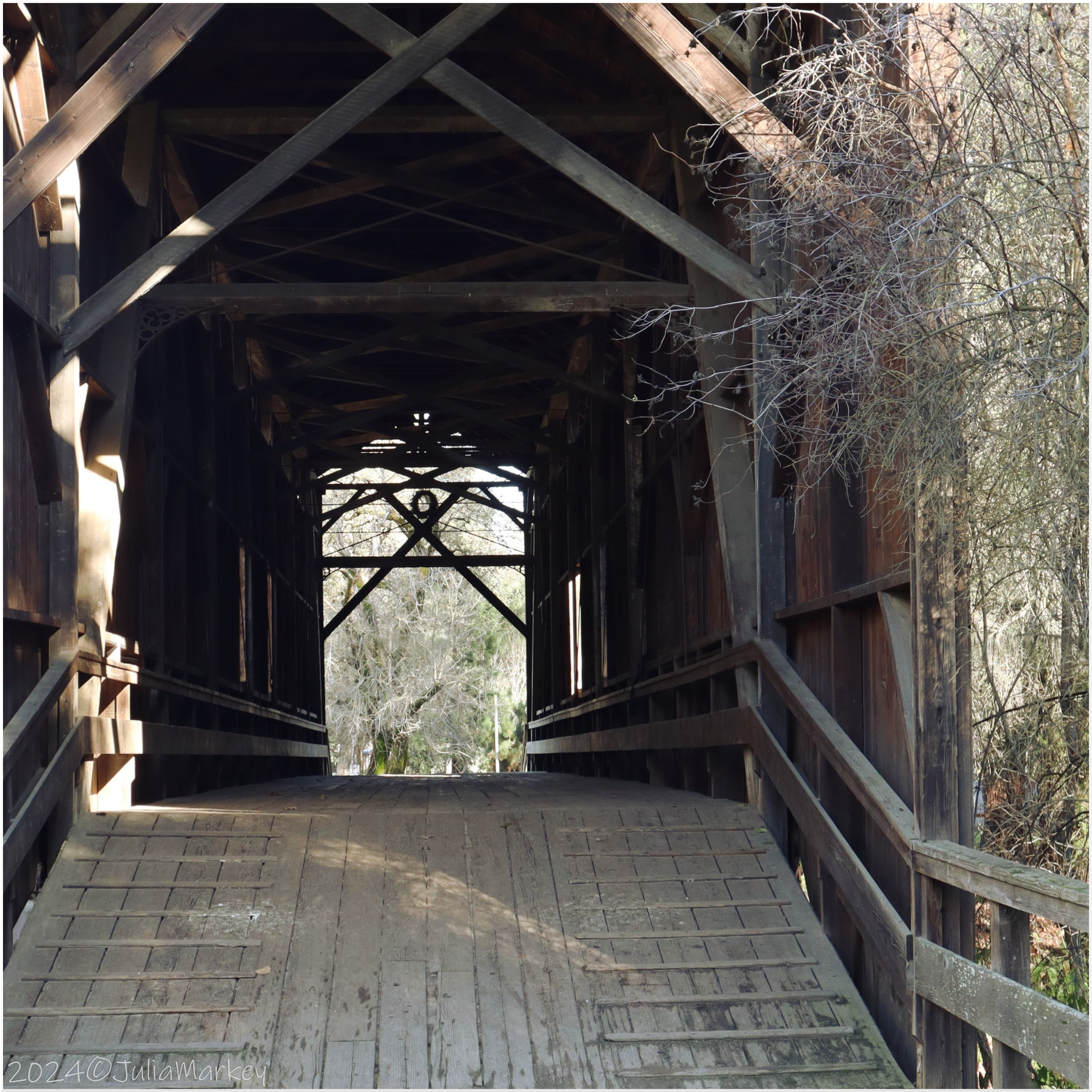
Interior of Felton Covered Bridge, December, 2024

The bridge is no longer used on the roadway, but is accessible to pedestrians visiting the Felton Covered Bridge Park.

== See also ==
- List of bridges in the United States
- List of covered bridges in California
- National Register of Historic Places listings in Santa Cruz County, California
