= Glen Canyon Covered Bridge =

Former bridge near Santa Cruz, California, USA

- U.S. National Register of Historic Places
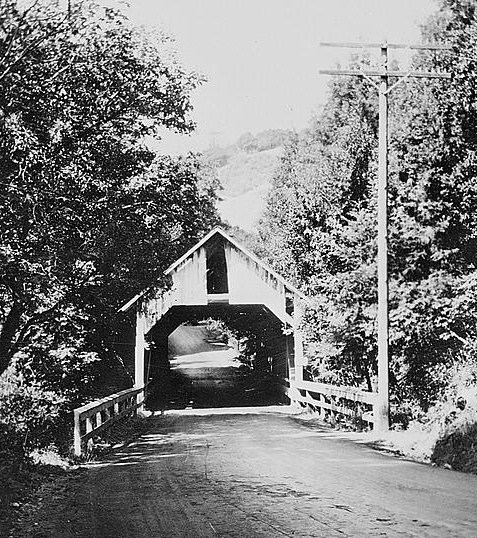

- Location within California
- Nearest city: Santa Cruz, California
- Coordinates: 37°00′00″N 122°00′08″W
- Area: 0.1 acres (0.040 ha)
- Built: 1892
- Built by: McKay, G.H.
- NRHP reference No.: 84001194
- Added to NRHP: May 17, 1984

The Glen Canyon Covered Bridge, near Santa Cruz, California, was a covered bridge built in 1892. It was listed on the National Register of Historic Places in 1984. It has since been demolished.

It was a single Howe truss span protected by a shake roof and vertical siding, built by G.H. McKay at cost of $1,145. It was 83 feet (25 m) long and was made of native fir and redwood.

It has also been known as Delaveaga Covered Bridge. It brought Glen Canyon Road over Branciforte Creek. The bridge was moved by volunteers about .5 miles (0.80 km) to another location spanning Branciforte Creek within Delaveaga Park, Santa Cruz County, California, in 1939, to save it from demolition.
