= Lower Blackburn Grade Bridge =

- U.S. National Register of Historic Places
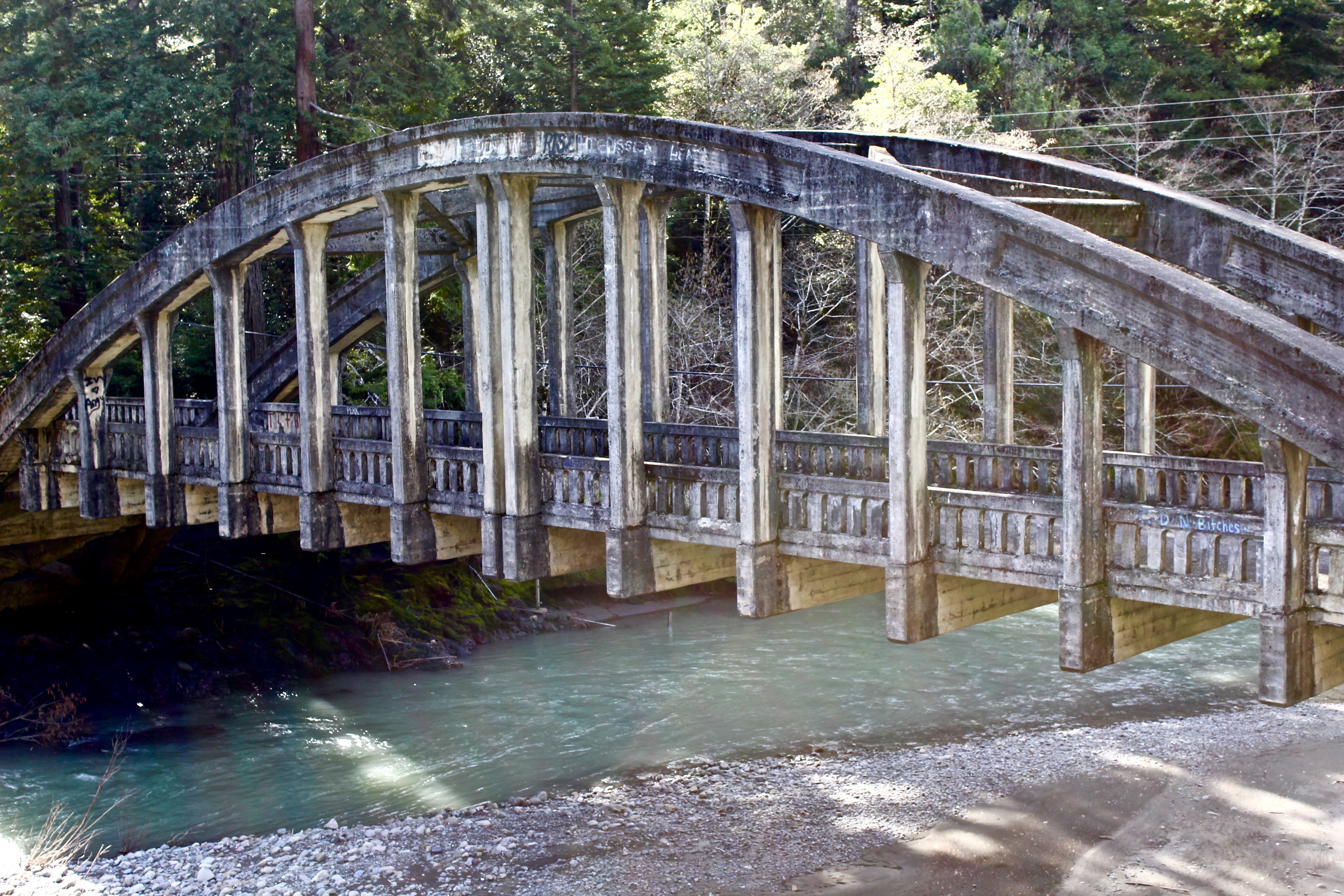

- Location within California
- Location: California State Route 36 outside Bridgeville, California
- Coordinates: 40°28′50″N 123°53′22″W
- Built: 1925
- Architect: John B. Leonard
- Architectural style: Through arch bridge
- NRHP reference No.: 81000148
- Added to NRHP: 25 June 1981

The Lower Blackburn Grade Bridge, also named the Van Duzen River Bridge or Mile 18 Bridge, is a 258-foot-long (79 m) reinforced concrete through arch with a main span approximately 150 feet (46 m) over the Van Duzen River about 4 miles (6.4 km) west of Bridgeville, California, United States. It was active from its construction in 1925 to 1985 when replaced.

The bridge has inset panels along the ornate concrete through arch and an architectural rail and is the only reinforced concrete through arch built along the Van Duzen River Highway. It was one of five bridges on the Fortuna to Red Bluff route on California State Route 36 designed by architect John B. Leonard in the years 1923 to 1925. The bridge was built by Humboldt County in 1925 to replace the steep grades and dangerous curves of the Blackburn Grade and a covered bridge at Bridgeville. The bridge was added to the National Register of Historic Places on 25 June 1981.

The bridge was bypassed and abandoned for vehicle traffic in 1985 when a reinforced concrete box girder bridge replaced the older bridge. The new bridge is named after Italian immigrant Silvio "Botchie" Santi.

== In popular culture ==
In the 1995 film Outbreak, filmed mostly in nearby Ferndale, a helicopter chase on the Van Duzen River includes the helicopters flying under the Lower Blackburn Grade Bridge, skimming on the top of the river.
