= Georgia Street Bridge–Caltrans Bridge =

Bridge in San Diego, California, United States

Georgia Street Bridge
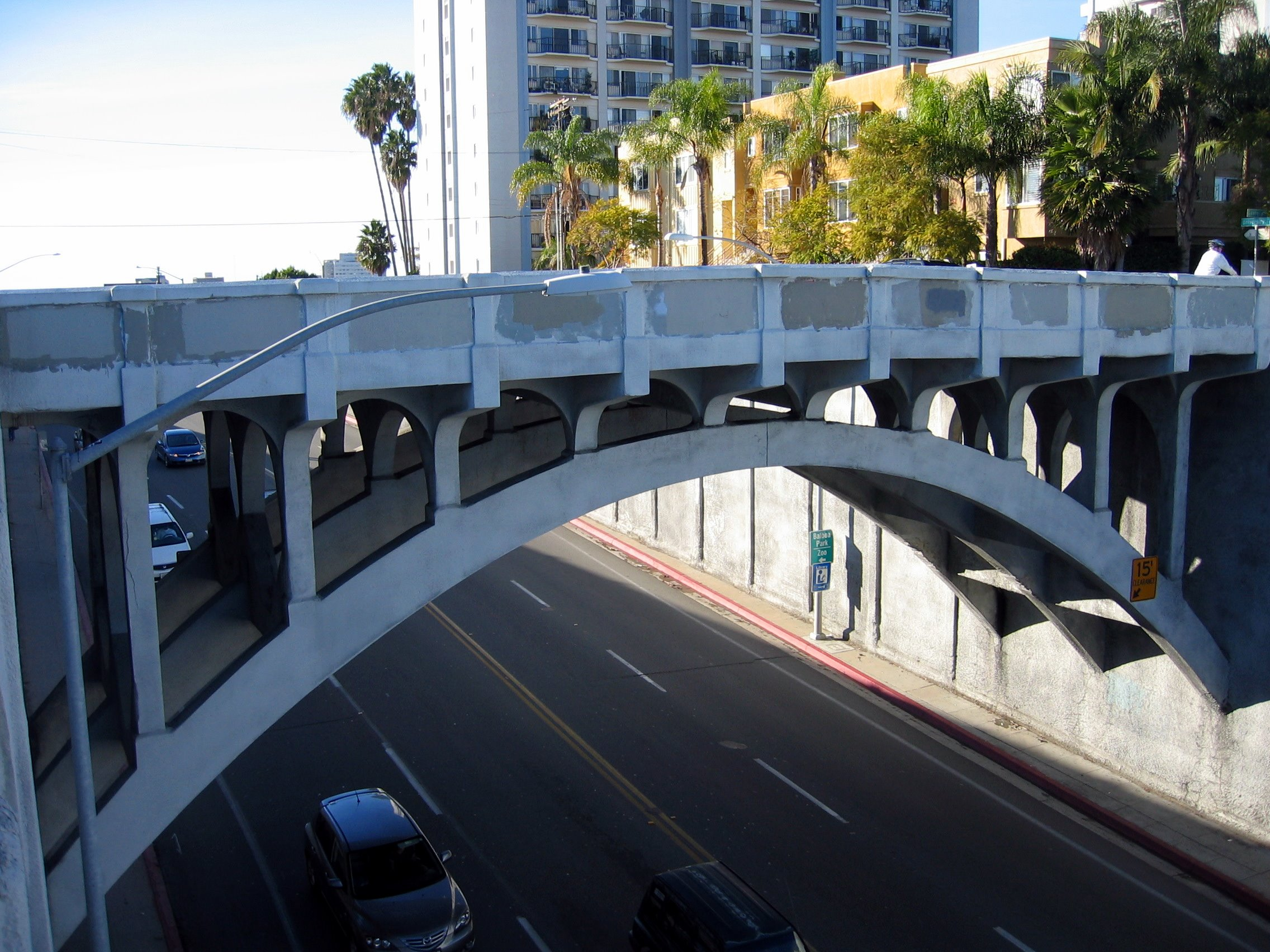
- Coordinates: 32°44′54″N 117°08′42″W
- Carries: Georgia Street
- Crosses: University Avenue
- Locale: San Diego, California
- Named for: Georgia Street

Characteristics
- Design: Arch bridge, with reinforced concrete deck
- Total length: 69 ft (21 m)
- Width: 30 ft (9 m)
- No. of lanes: 2

History
- Designer: James R. Comly
- Opened: 1907
- Rebuilt: 1914

Location
- Interactive map of Georgia Street Bridge

The Georgia Street Bridge in San Diego, California, was constructed in 1907 to carry traffic, after a streetcar line was cut through a ridge where Georgia Street stood. In 1914, a Romanesque spandrel arch with Mission Revival styling made of reinforced concrete and designed by J.R. Comly was built there.

It was designed to complement the Panama–California Exposition at nearby Balboa Park. Between 1914 and 1948, the San Diego Electric Railway's East San Diego Trolley Line traveled under the bridge along University Avenue. Upon application by the University Heights Historical Society, it was added to the National Register of Historic Places in 1999.

The bridge was restored in 2016, uncovering several artifacts, including trolley tracks and a spoon.
