= Torrance Industrial Lead =

Railway spur line

The Torrance Industrial Lead is a 9.9-mile (15.9 km) railway spur line in Los Angeles County, California. It is owned by the Union Pacific Railroad. The line connects businesses in Torrance and Gardena to the national rail network as a branch of the El Segundo Industrial Lead. The line was largely built by the Los Angeles Inter-Urban Electric Railway with service starting in 1903. The route was used by Pacific Electric San Pedro via Gardena Line interurban passenger services until 1940. Southern Pacific continued to serve the line after Pacific Electric's dissolution. The southernmost 2 miles (3.2 km) of tracks were abandoned in 1974. Ownership passing to Union Pacific after Southern Pacific merger in 1998. By 2007, the line was served by a single daily freight train. Customers included ConocoPhillips, Jones Chemical, and Crenshaw Lumber.
