= Rosewood, Humboldt County, California =

Unincorporated community in California, United States

Rosewood
- Unincorporated community
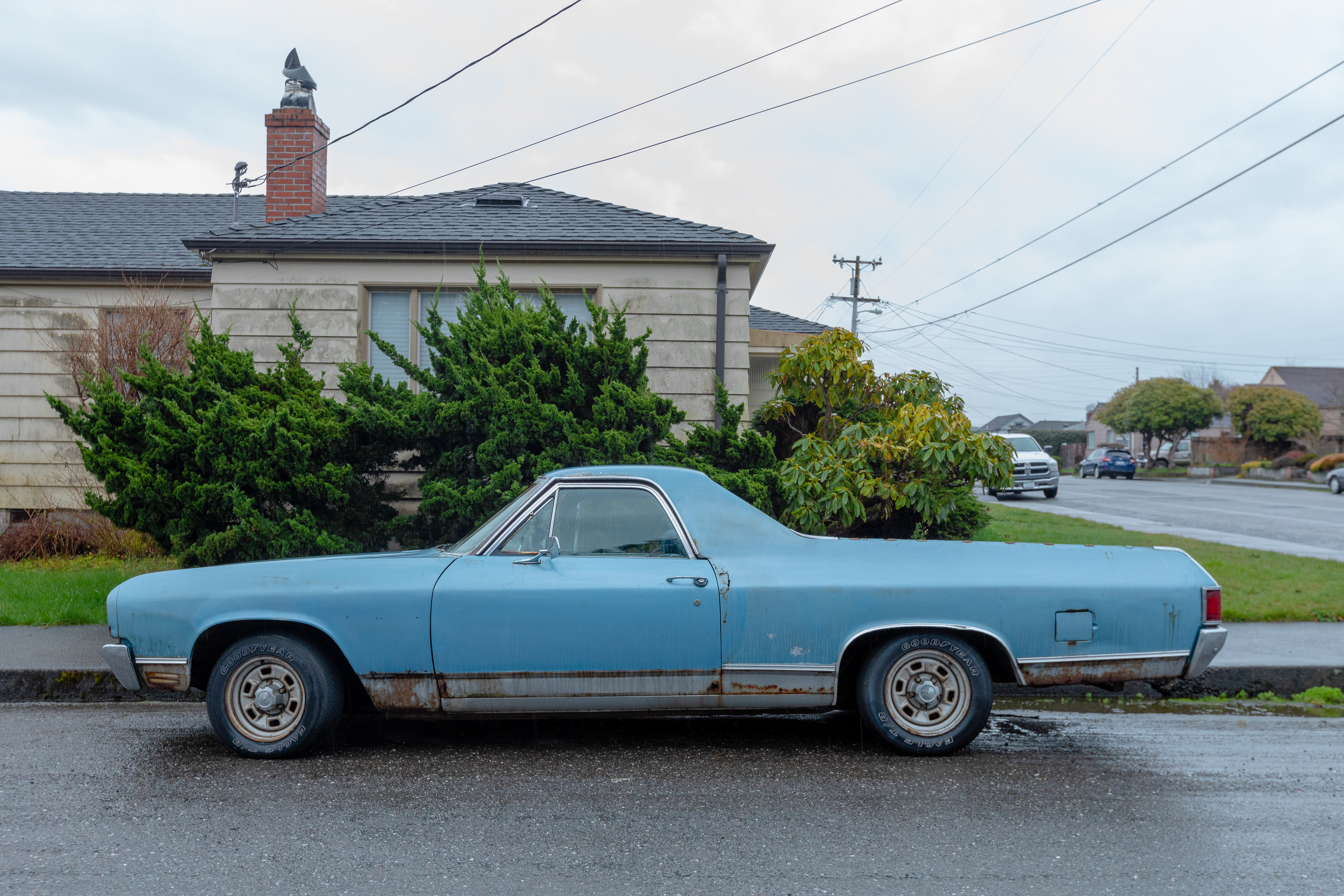
- Willow Street in Rosewood

- Location in California Rosewood (the United States)
- Coordinates: 40°46′04″N 124°09′56″W
- Country: United States
- State: California
- County: Humboldt County
- Elevation: 130 ft (40 m)

Rosewood (formerly, Stumpville) is an unincorporated community in Humboldt County, California, United States. It is located 1 mi (1.6 km) south of Eureka, at an elevation of 131 feet (40 m).

The Stumpville post office opened in 1930, changed its name to Rosewood in 1941, and closed permanently in 1955. The Rosewood area is a mostly residential district just outside the Eureka city limits.
