= Tocaloma, California =

Unincorporated community in California, United States

Tocaloma
- Unincorporated community
- Location in California Tocaloma (the United States)
- Coordinates: 38°03′01″N 122°45′34″W
- Country: United States
- State: California
- County: Marin
- Elevation: 75 ft (23 m)

Tocaloma (Miwok: Tokoloma, meaning "salamander") was an unincorporated community in Marin County, California, United States. It was located on the Northwestern Pacific Railroad, 3 miles (4.8 km) east-southeast of Point Reyes Station, at an elevation of 75 feet (23 m). It was the location of a 42 room resort hotel catering to fishermen and hunters. The hotel burned down in 1916. By vehicle, it is near the McIsaac's ranch on Sir Francis Drake Boulevard just east of the ascent to the ridge before Olema.

A post office operated at Tocaloma from 1891 to 1919.
