= Elk River (California) =

River in California, United States

Coordinates: 40°46′22″N 124°11′47″W

The Elk River is a river in the U.S. state of California, originating at 2,000 feet (610 m) elevation in forested highlands southeast of Eureka, California. The north and south forks combine to flow 15 miles (24 km) into Humboldt Bay on the south edge of Eureka. The river was called Ka-sha-reh by the Wiyot people, but received its present name after Josiah Gregg's party enjoyed a meal of elk meat near the river on Christmas, 1849.

In 2014, the North Coast Regional Water Quality Control Board recommended that the Elk River be listed as an impaired waterway because of E. coli contamination 600 times greater than normal.
