= Knights Ferry, California =

Unincorporated community in California, United States

- Knights Ferry
- U.S. National Register of Historic Places
- U.S. Historic district
- California Historical Landmark
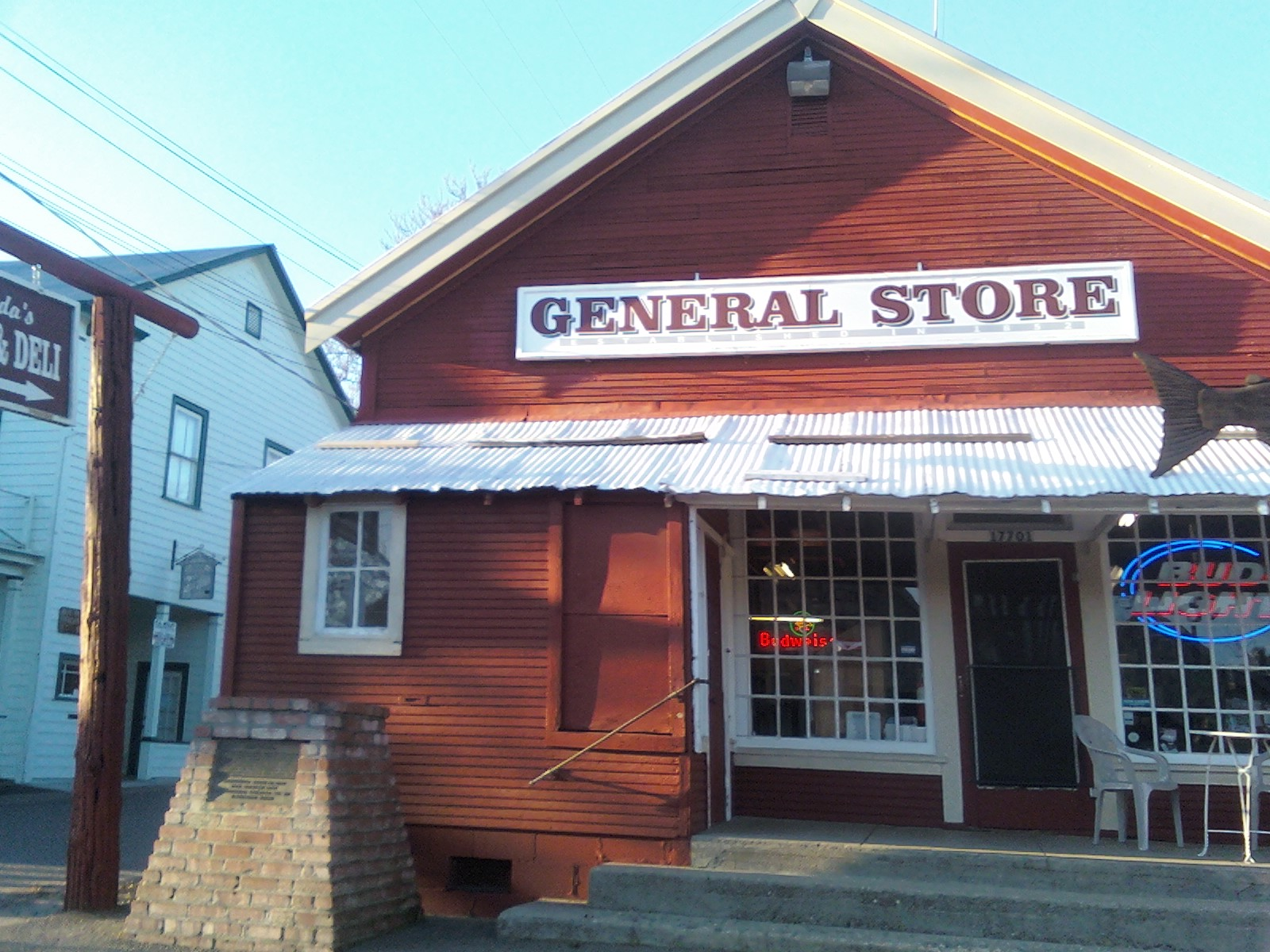
- California's oldest operating general store is located in Knights Ferry.

- Location within California Location within the United States
- Nearest city: Oakdale, California
- Coordinates: 37°49′11″N 120°39′52″W
- Area: 107 acres (43 ha)
- Built: 1849
- Architectural style: Mid 19th Century Revival, Gothic Revival, Classical Revival
- NRHP reference No.: 75000490
- CHISL No.: 347
- Added to NRHP: April 23, 1975

Knights Ferry is an unincorporated historic community and census-designated place (CDP) in Stanislaus County, California, United States. Nestled in the foothills of the Sierra Nevada, it is about 30 miles (48 km) east of Modesto on the Stanislaus River. The Williams Ranch near the town was one of many filming locations for the television series Bonanza and Little House on the Prairie.

As of the 2020 census, Knights Ferry had a population of 112.

Knights Ferry is home to the Knights Ferry Bridge, the longest covered bridge west of the Mississippi River at 330 feet (100 m) in length. It is also home to a K-8 elementary school and a museum about the history of the town and also about local wildlife. The town's ruins include a mill and a jail.

== History ==
When gold was discovered in California in 1849, Dr. William Knight rediscovered a place which he and John C. Fremont had previously found to be a favorable river crossing, and established a ferry boat there. Soon, the ferry boat prospered and Knight and Captain James Vantine built a hotel and trading post near the crossing. On November 9, 1849, Knight was killed in a gunfight and was buried in an unmarked grave. Knight's family believed he was stabbed to death in his bed and was buried near the gate in the yard of John Dent's house, which was Dr. Knight's place at the time. John Dent and his brother Lewis immediately took possession of Bill Knight's property at Knight's Ferry following the murder.

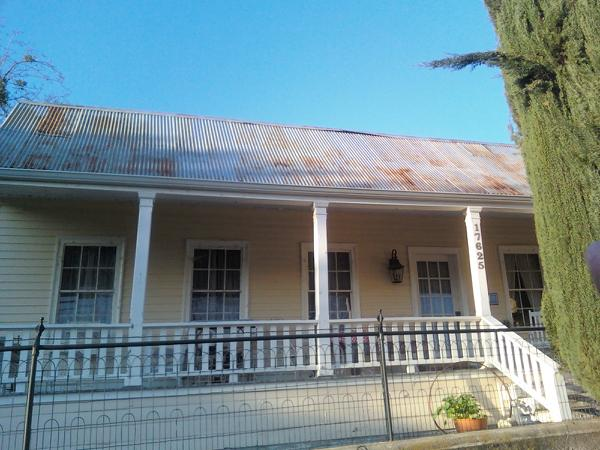
Lewis Dent House

After Knight's death, Vantine operated the ferry alone until he formed another collaboration with John and Lewis Dent, whose sister Julia married future U.S. President Ulysses S. Grant. In 1852, Vantine sold his properties in the area to the Dents and moved elsewhere. A new townsite under the name of "Dentville" was laid out by John Dent. The inhabitants continued to call the town "Knights Ferry" and "Knights Crossing".

In 1852 a toll bridge replaced the ferry, but it was destroyed by the Great Flood of 1862. The new covered bridge was built at a higher level than the previous one, and it still stands today. This bridge was used for car traffic until it was closed in 1985 to prevent damage. In addition to being the longest covered bridge west of the Mississippi River, the bridge is one of the nation's finest examples of a Howe truss covered bridge. It was designated a National Historic Landmark in 2012.

Knights Ferry became the county seat in 1862, replacing La Grange. It was soon succeeded by the new, prosperous railroad boomtown of Modesto, in 1871.

== Tourism ==
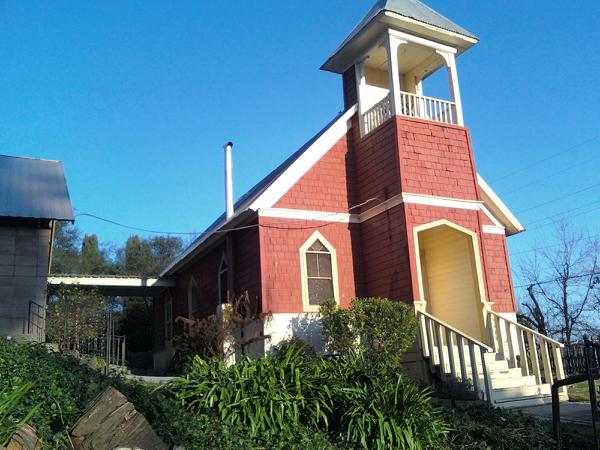
Knights Ferry Community Church

The following is a list of historic contributions that make up the Knights Ferry Historic District.

- Abraham Schell House. Built in 1856, it was built of sandstone for Abraham Schell, owner of the Rancho del Río Estanislao.
- Lewis Dent House. Built in 1851, it was owned by Lewis Dent, the brother-in-law of future President Ulysses S. Grant, who visited Knights Ferry in 1852, when he was an army captain in Benicia and Eureka. It is the oldest home in the community.
- Knights Ferry Community Church. Built in 1890 to replace the previous structure constructed in 1860, the church conserved the original pews, altar and upper windows. The church still hosts services by Pastor Bob Sadler.
- General Store. California's oldest operating general store was built in 1852 by Moulton and Drew as the second structure in the town. It was bought by George Valpey, who became a Wells Fargo agent in 1867.
- Millers Hall. Constructed in 1863, the building operated as a restaurant, pool and poker parlor on the ground floor, and a dance hall upstairs. It was restored in 1984 by the Knights Ferry History and Museum Associates and now is home to the post office, community library, ice cream parlor and local-made goods shop.

== Recreation ==
Located next to Knights Ferry is the Knights Ferry Recreation Area, managed by the U.S. Army Corps of Engineers. This recreation area includes a "put in" location for Class I-II rafting trips on the Stanislaus River. Rafting most often occurs April through October. Water in the lower Stanislaus is discharged from the base of New Melones Dam, resulting in clear and cold water even in the warmest months of summer. The Army Corps of Engineers maintains recreational facilities along the Stanislaus River. Park rangers caution rafters to exercise caution and use life vests, as the rapids below Knights Ferry can be challenging when the river is high.

The ZIP Code is 95361. The town is inside area code 209. Knights Ferry is part of the Modesto Metropolitan Statistical Area.

== Willms Ranch ==
Willms Ranch house in 1852

Willms Ranch is a California Historical Landmark in Knights Ferry.

The California Historical Landmark number 415 reads:

NO. 415 THE WILLMS RANCH - Arriving in California October 12, 1849, John R. Willms and John H. Kappelmann engaged in the hotel and butcher businesses in Buena Vista, in what is now Stanislaus County. They bought up mining claims and settler's claims until, by 1852, they had a tract of 3,600 acres. The 'KW' brand was the first in Stanislaus County in 1852. After the death of Kappelmann, Willms carried on alone, and the ranch has been owned by the Willms family ever since.

== Fossils ==
Vertebrate fossils from the Pliocene have been found near Knights Ferry.

== Government ==
In the California State Legislature, Knights Ferry is in the 4th senatorial district, represented by Republican Marie Alvarado-Gil, and in the 9th Assembly district, represented by Republican Heath Flora.

In the United States House of Representatives, Knights Ferry is in California's 5th congressional district, represented by Republican Tom McClintock.

== Demographics ==
Historical population
Census	Pop.	Note	%±
2020	112		—
U.S. Decennial Census; 1850–1870 1880-1890; 1900 1910 1920; 1930 1940 1950; 1960 1970 1980; 1990 2000 2010; 2020

Knights Ferry first appeared as a census designated place in the 2020 U.S. census.

=== 2020 Census ===
Knights Ferry CDP, California – Racial and ethnic composition Note: the US Census treats Hispanic/Latino as an ethnic category. This table excludes Latinos from the racial categories and assigns them to a separate category. Hispanics/Latinos may be of any race.
Race / Ethnicity (NH = Non-Hispanic)	Pop 2020	% 2020
White alone (NH)	92	82.14%
Black or African American alone (NH)	0	0.00%
Native American or Alaska Native alone (NH)	1	0.89%
Asian alone (NH)	3	2.68%
Pacific Islander alone (NH)	0	0.00%
Other race alone (NH)	3	2.68%
Mixed race or Multiracial (NH)	3	2.68%
Hispanic or Latino (any race)	10	8.93%
Total	112	100.00%

== Sister city ==
San Jerónimo (Los Barbosa), Jalisco, Mexico

== Climate ==
According to the Köppen Climate Classification system, Knights Ferry has a warm-summer Mediterranean climate, abbreviated "Csa" on climate maps.
