= List of bridges documented by the Historic American Engineering Record in California =

This is a list of bridges documented by the Historic American Engineering Record in the US state of California.

== Bridges ==
Survey No.	Name (as assigned by HAER)	Status	Type	Built	Documented	Carries	Crosses	Location	County	Coordinates
CA-4	Moody Bridge	Replaced	Parker truss	1938	1979	Sprowel Creek Road	South Fork Eel River	Garberville	Humboldt	40°05′26″N 123°47′56″W
CA-7	Colusa Bridge	Replaced	Swing span	1901	1979	River Road	Sacramento River	Colusa	Colusa	39°12′56″N 122°00′00″W
CA-9; CA-129	Van Duzen Bridge	Replaced	Reinforced concrete open-spandrel arch	1925	1981; 1991	US 101	Van Duzen River	Carlotta	Humboldt	40°32′19″N 124°08′49″W
CA-10	Shafter Bridge	Replaced	Reinforced concrete open-spandrel arch	1924	1981	Sir Francis Drake Boulevard	Lagunitas Creek	Lagunitas	Marin	38°00′16″N 122°42′32″W
CA-17	San Roque Canyon Bridge	Replaced	Steel arch	1931	1982	SR 192	San Roque Creek	Santa Barbara	Santa Barbara	34°26′59″N 119°44′06″W
CA-18	San Antonio Creek Bridge	Replaced	Reinforced concrete girder	1916	1982	SR 1 (former)	San Antonio Creek	Lompoc	Santa Barbara	34°45′47″N 120°25′30″W
CA-19	Crow Creek Bridge	Demolished	Reinforced concrete open-spandrel arch	1913	1982	Grove Way	Crow Creek	Castro Valley	Alameda	37°41′33″N 122°03′35″W
CA-22	Honeydew Creek Bridge	Replaced	Warren truss	1925	1979	Wilder Ridge Road	Honeydew Creek	Honeydew	Humboldt	40°13′20″N 124°06′42″W
CA-23	Prospect Boulevard Bridge	Replaced	Viaduct	1908	1984	Prospect Boulevard	Seco Street	Pasadena	Los Angeles	34°09′32″N 118°09′44″W
CA-29	South Fork Trinity River Bridge	Replaced	Cantilever	1930	1985	SR 299	South Fork Trinity River	Salyer	Trinity	40°53′19″N 123°36′05″W
CA-31	Golden Gate Bridge	Extant	Suspension	1937	1984	US 101 / SR 1	Golden Gate	San Francisco and Sausalito	San Francisco and Marin	37°49′11″N 122°28′43″W
CA-32	San Francisco–Oakland Bay Bridge	Extant (west span); Replaced (east span)	Suspension (west span); Cantilever (east span)	1936	1985	I-80	San Francisco Bay	San Francisco and Oakland	San Francisco and Alameda	37°49′05″N 122°20′48″W
CA-33	Alvord Lake Bridge	Extant	Reinforced concrete closed-spandrel arch	1889	1984	Kezar Drive	Golden Gate Park trail	San Francisco	San Francisco	37°46′08″N 122°27′18″W
CA-34	Bidwell Bar Suspension Bridge and Stone Toll House	Relocated	Suspension	1855			Lake Oroville	Oroville	Butte	39°32′15″N 121°27′15″W
CA-36	Tobin Highway Bridge	Extant	K-truss		1984	SR 70	North Fork Feather River	Tobin	Plumas	39°56′12″N 121°18′57″W
CA-40	Purdon Crossing Bridge	Extant	Pratt truss	1889	1984	Purdon Crossing Road	Yuba River South Fork	Nevada City	Nevada	39°19′40″N 121°02′47″W
CA-41	Bridgeport Covered Bridge	Bypassed	Howe truss	1862	1984	Pleasant Valley Road	Yuba River South Fork	Bridgeport	Nevada	39°17′34″N 121°11′42″W
CA-44	Gianella Bridge	Replaced	Swing span	1911	1985	SR 32	Sacramento River	Hamilton City and Chico	Glenn and Butte	39°45′04″N 121°59′46″W
CA-45	Llagas Creek Bridge	Replaced	Reinforced concrete girder	1911	1984	Gilman Road	Llagas Creek	Gilroy	Santa Clara	37°01′01″N 121°32′36″W
CA-46	Pacheco Creek Bridge	Replaced	Pratt truss	1915	1985	San Felipe Road	Pacheco Creek	Gilroy and Dunneville	Santa Clara and San Benito	36°57′35″N 121°25′06″W
CA-48-A	Tule River Hydroelectric Complex, Tule River Bridge	Demolished	Pratt truss	1913	1985	San Joaquin Light and Power Corporation access road	Tule River North Fork Middle Fork	Springville	Tulare	36°09′46″N 118°42′27″W
CA-49	Cache Creek Bridge	Replaced	Parker truss	1909	1985	Lake Street	Cache Creek	Clearlake	Lake	38°55′33″N 122°36′42″W
CA-50	Zanja No. 3, Brick Culvert	Demolished	Brick arch	1869	1986	Commercial Street	Zanja No. 3	Los Angeles	Los Angeles	34°03′12″N 118°14′16″W
CA-52	Carroll Overhead Bridge	Demolished	Reinforced concrete T-beam	1923	1987	Altamont Pass Road	Southern Pacific Railroad	Livermore	Alameda	37°43′25″N 121°40′36″W
CA-55	Isleton Bridge	Extant	Strauss bascule	1923	1983	SR 160	Sacramento River	Isleton	Sacramento	38°10′19″N 121°35′38″W
CA-58	Colorado Street Bridge	Extant	Reinforced concrete open-spandrel arch	1913	1988	Colorado Boulevard	Arroyo Seco	Pasadena	Los Angeles	34°08′42″N 118°09′50″W
CA-68	Rowdy Creek Bridge	Replaced	Reinforced concrete girder	1913	1989	Fred Haight Drive	Rowdy Creek	Smith River	Del Norte	41°55′18″N 124°08′46″W
CA-70	Salinas River Bridge	Demolished	Pratt truss	1915	1989	Chualar River Road	Salinas River	Chualar	Monterey	36°33′00″N 121°32′50″W
CA-72	Middle Fork Stanislaus River Bridge	Replaced	Scissor truss	1933	1989	SR 108	Middle Fork Stanislaus River	Dardanelle	Tuolumne	38°20′26″N 119°49′35″W
CA-73	Sacramento River Bridge	Extant	Vertical-lift bridge	1936	1985	SR 275	Sacramento River	Sacramento and West Sacramento	Sacramento and Yolo	38°34′50″N 121°30′30″W
CA-75	Smith River Bridge	Replaced	Cantilever	1929	1989	US 199	Smith River	Crescent City	Del Norte	41°48′24″N 124°04′56″W
CA-83	Wildcat Creek Bridge	Extant	Reinforced concrete open-spandrel arch	1939	1991	Big Oak Flat Road	Wildcat Creek	Yosemite Village	Mariposa	37°43′31″N 119°43′05″W
CA-84	Tamarack Creek Bridge	Extant	Reinforced concrete open-spandrel arch	1939	1991	Big Oak Flat Road	Tamarack Creek	Yosemite Village	Mariposa	37°43′40″N 119°42′52″W
CA-85	Cascade Creek Bridge	Extant	Reinforced concrete open-spandrel arch	1939	1991	Big Oak Flat Road	Cascade Creek	Yosemite Village	Mariposa	37°43′40″N 119°42′48″W
CA-90	Pohono Bridge (Note: See also HAER No. CA-117, "Yosemite National Park Roads and Bridges" for additional documentation)	Extant	Reinforced concrete closed-spandrel arch	1928	1991	Yosemite Valley Road	Merced River	Yosemite Village	Mariposa	37°42′54″N 119°39′52″W
CA-91	Bridalveil Fall Bridge No. 1	Extant	Reinforced concrete closed-spandrel arch	1913	1991	Carriage road	Bridalveil Fall	Yosemite Village	Mariposa	37°43′14″N 119°25′20″W
CA-92	Bridalveil Fall Bridge No. 2	Extant	Reinforced concrete closed-spandrel arch	1913	1991	Carriage road	Bridalveil Fall	Yosemite Village	Mariposa	37°43′16″N 119°25′19″W
CA-93	Bridalveil Fall Bridge No. 3	Extant	Reinforced concrete closed-spandrel arch	1913	1991	Carriage road	Bridalveil Fall	Yosemite Village	Mariposa	37°43′18″N 119°25′16″W
CA-93-A	Bridalveil Fall Culverts	Extant	Reinforced concrete closed-spandrel arch		1991	Southside Drive	Unnamed streams	Yosemite Village	Mariposa	
CA-94	Sentinel Bridge	Replaced	Reinforced concrete girder	1919	1991	Sentinel Drive	Merced River	Yosemite Village	Mariposa	37°44′36″N 119°35′23″W
CA-95	Stoneman Bridge	Extant	Reinforced concrete closed-spandrel arch	1932	1991	Stoneman Crossover Road	Merced River	Yosemite Village	Mariposa	37°44′26″N 119°34′26″W
CA-96	Clark's Bridge	Extant	Reinforced concrete closed-spandrel arch	1928	1991	Service road	Merced River	Yosemite Village	Mariposa	37°44′23″N 119°33′54″W
CA-97	Happy Isles Bridge	Extant	Reinforced concrete closed-spandrel arch	1929	1991	Service road	Merced River	Yosemite Village	Mariposa	37°43′57″N 119°33′31″W
CA-98	Tenaya Creek Bridge	Extant	Reinforced concrete closed-spandrel arch	1928	1991	Mirror Lake Road	Tenaya Creek	Yosemite Village	Mariposa	37°44′31″N 119°33′29″W
CA-99	Sugar Pine Bridge	Extant	Reinforced concrete closed-spandrel arch	1928	1991	Service road	Merced River	Yosemite Village	Mariposa	37°44′40″N 119°34′12″W
CA-100	Ahwahnee Bridge	Extant	Reinforced concrete closed-spandrel arch	1928	1991	Service road	Merced River	Yosemite Village	Mariposa	37°44′39″N 119°34′24″W
CA-101	El Capitan Bridge	Extant	Steel rolled multi-beam	1933	1991	El Capitan Drive	Merced River	Yosemite Village	Mariposa	37°43′26″N 119°37′53″W
CA-102	Yosemite Creek Bridge	Extant	Reinforced concrete closed-spandrel arch	1922	1991	Northside Drive	Yosemite Creek	Yosemite Village	Mariposa	37°44′43″N 119°35′42″W
CA-103	Bridalveil Creek Bridge	Extant	Steel rolled multi-beam	1933	1991	Glacier Point Road	Bridalveil Creek	Yosemite Village	Mariposa	37°40′00″N 119°36′58″W
CA-104	Old Happy Isles Bridge	Demolished	Reinforced concrete girder	1921	1991	Service road	Merced River	Yosemite Village	Mariposa	37°43′51″N 119°33′31″W
CA-106	Wawona Covered Bridge	Extant	Queen post truss	1868	1991	Service road	South Fork Merced River	Wawona	Mariposa	37°32′19″N 119°39′17″W
CA-108	South Fork Tuolumne River Bridge	Extant	Steel rolled multi-beam	1937	1991	Tioga Road	Tuolumne River South Fork	Mather	Tuolumne	37°47′33″N 119°43′22″W
CA-109	Tuolumne Meadows Bridge	Extant	Steel rolled multi-beam	1933	1991	Tioga Road	Tuolumne River	Mather	Tuolumne	37°52′34″N 119°21′18″W
CA-113	South Fork Merced River Bridge	Replaced	Steel rolled multi-beam	1931	1991	Wawona Road	South Fork Merced River	Wawona	Mariposa	37°32′18″N 119°39′33″W
CA-117	Yosemite National Park Roads and Bridges	Extant			1991			Yosemite Village	Mariposa	
CA-122	Victoria Bridge	Extant	Reinforced concrete open-spandrel arch	1928	1991	Victoria Avenue	Tequesquite Arroyo	Riverside	Riverside	33°57′43″N 117°22′14″W
CA-123	Union Pacific Railroad Bridge	Extant	Reinforced concrete closed-spandrel arch	1904	1991	Union Pacific Railroad	Santa Ana River	Riverside	Riverside	33°58′08″N 117°26′11″W
CA-126	Salt River Bridge	Replaced	Reinforced concrete girder	1919	1992	Dillon Road	Salt River	Ferndale	Humboldt	40°35′42″N 124°16′29″W
CA-131	Freeman's Crossing Bridge	Replaced	Reinforced concrete open-spandrel arch	1921	1992	SR 49	Middle Yuba River	North San Juan and Camptonville	Nevada and Yuba	39°23′40″N 121°05′04″W
CA-132	Parks Bar Bridge	Replaced	Reinforced concrete open-spandrel arch	1913	1991	SR 20	Yuba River	Smartsville	Yuba	39°13′14″N 121°20′01″W
CA-136	Weidemeyer Bridge	Replaced	Pratt truss	1898	1989	Rawson Road	Thomes Creek	Corning	Tehama	39°58′35″N 122°13′33″W
CA-137	Chili Bar Bridge	Replaced	Reinforced concrete open-spandrel arch	1922	1991	SR 193	South Fork American River	Placerville	El Dorado	38°45′57″N 120°49′20″W
CA-140-A	Generals Highway, Lodgepole Bridge (Note: See also HAER No. CA-140, "Generals Highway" for additional documentation)	Extant	Reinforced concrete closed-spandrel arch	1931	1993	Generals Highway	Kaweah River Marble Fork	Three Rivers	Tulare	36°36′17″N 118°44′04″W
CA-140-B	Generals Highway, Clover Creek Bridge	Extant	Reinforced concrete closed-spandrel arch	1931	1993	Generals Highway	Clover Creek	Three Rivers	Tulare	36°36′26″N 118°44′50″W
CA-141	Marble Fork Bridge	Replaced	Pratt truss	1919	1993	Crystal Cave Road	Kaweah River Marble Fork	Three Rivers	Tulare	36°34′33″N 118°47′11″W
CA-142	Oak Grove Bridge	Extant	Reinforced concrete open-spandrel arch	1923	2002	Mineral King Road	Kaweah River East Fork	Three Rivers	Tulare	36°26′58″N 118°47′35″W
CA-143	Pumpkin Hollow Bridge	Extant	Reinforced concrete open-spandrel arch	1922	2002	SR 198	Kaweah River Middle Fork	Three Rivers	Tulare	36°28′45″N 118°50′22″W
CA-156	Henry Ford Bridge	Replaced	Strauss bascule	1924	1994	Pacific Harbor Line	Cerritos Channel	Long Beach	Los Angeles	33°45′58″N 118°14′25″W
CA-158	Gault Bridge	Extant	Steel hinged arch	1903	1993	South Pine Street	Deer Creek	Nevada City	Nevada	39°15′39″N 121°01′10″W
CA-160	Bacon Island Road Bridge	Replaced	Swing span	1906	1992	Bacon Island Road	Middle River	Stockton	San Joaquin	37°57′23″N 121°31′43″W
CA-161	Stanislaus River Bridge	Replaced (main span)	Pratt truss	1905	1995	Atchison, Topeka and Santa Fe Railway	Stanislaus River	Riverbank	Stanislaus	37°44′32″N 120°56′32″W
CA-171	Red Bank Creek Bridge	Demolished	Pratt truss	1894	1995	Rawson Road (former alignment)	Red Bank Creek	Red Bluff	Tehama	40°08′24″N 122°14′24″W
CA-172	Dry Creek Bridge	Replaced	Pratt truss	1895	1995	Cook Road	Dry Creek	Ione	Amador	38°19′35″N 120°59′29″W
CA-175	First Street Bridge (Note: See also HAER No. CA-271, "Los Angeles River Bridges" for additional documentation)	Extant	Reinforced concrete open-spandrel arch	1928	1996	East 1st Street	Los Angeles River	Los Angeles	Los Angeles	34°02′53″N 118°13′48″W
CA-176	Sixth Street Bridge	Replaced	Steel arch	1932	1996	East 6th Street	Los Angeles River	Los Angeles	Los Angeles	34°02′17″N 118°13′37″W
CA-177	Ninth Street Viaduct	Extant	Reinforced concrete open-spandrel arch	1925	1996	Olympic Boulevard	Los Angeles River	Los Angeles	Los Angeles	34°01′32″N 118°13′30″W
CA-184	Walker Bridge	Replaced	Pennsylvania truss	1893	1997	Walker Bridge Connection Road	Klamath River	Klamath River	Siskiyou	41°50′15″N 122°51′53″W
CA-194	Pleasants Valley Road Bridge	Replaced	Reinforced concrete closed-spandrel arch	1917	1997	Pleasants Valley Road	Pleasants Creek	Vacaville	Solano	38°28′27″N 122°01′47″W
CA-221	Southern Pacific Railroad Shasta Route, Bridge No. 210.52	Extant	Swing span (former)	1898	1997	Southern Pacific Railroad	Sacramento River	Tehama	Tehama	40°01′43″N 122°07′10″W
CA-222	Southern Pacific Railroad Shasta Route, Bridge No. 301.85	Extant	Pratt truss	1901	1997	Southern Pacific Railroad	Sacramento River	Pollard Flat	Shasta	40°59′30″N 122°24′54″W
CA-223	Southern Pacific Railroad Shasta Route, Bridge No. 310.58	Extant	Pratt truss	1901	1997	Southern Pacific Railroad	Sacramento River	Sims	Shasta	41°04′47″N 122°21′05″W
CA-224	Southern Pacific Railroad Shasta Route, Bridge No. 324.99	Extant	Pratt truss	1901	1997	Southern Pacific Railroad	Sacramento River	Shasta Springs	Siskiyou	41°14′34″N 122°16′02″W
CA-258	Zaca Creek Bridge No. 1	Replaced	Reinforced concrete girder	1916	1999	Jonata Park Road	Zaca Creek	Buellton	Santa Barbara	34°38′55″N 120°11′03″W
CA-259	Zaca Creek Bridge No. 2	Extant	Reinforced concrete girder	1916	1999	Jonata Park Road	Zaca Creek	Buellton	Santa Barbara	34°39′17″N 120°11′00″W
CA-263	Cut Stone Bridge	Extant	Stone arch	1863	1999	Southern Pacific Railroad	Runoff channel	South San Francisco	San Mateo	37°38′45″N 122°25′19″W
CA-264	Black Canyon Road Bridge	Bypassed	Reinforced concrete open-spandrel arch	1913	1997	Black Canyon Road	Santa Ysabel Creek	Ramona	San Diego	33°07′25″N 116°48′00″W
CA-265-C	Arroyo Seco Parkway, College Street Bridge	Extant	Reinforced concrete girder	1943	1999	College Street	SR 110 (Arroyo Seco Parkway)	Los Angeles	Los Angeles	34°03′57″N 118°14′33″W
CA-265-E	Arroyo Seco Parkway, Stadium Way Bridge	Extant	Reinforced concrete girder	1943	1999	Stadium Way	SR 110 (Arroyo Seco Parkway) northbound	Los Angeles	Los Angeles	34°04′16″N 118°14′06″W
CA-265-H	Arroyo Seco Parkway, Solano Avenue Underpass	Extant	Reinforced concrete girder	1943	1999	SR 110 (Arroyo Seco Parkway) southbound	Solano Avenue	Los Angeles	Los Angeles	34°04′32″N 118°13′55″W
CA-265-I	Arroyo Seco Parkway, Park Row Bridge	Extant	Reinforced concrete open-spandrel arch	1943	1999	Park Row	SR 110 (Arroyo Seco Parkway) southbound	Los Angeles	Los Angeles	34°04′35″N 118°13′52″W
CA-265-J	Arroyo Seco Parkway, Figueroa Street Viaduct	Extant	Steel built-up girder	1936	1999	SR 110 (Arroyo Seco Parkway)	Los Angeles River	Los Angeles	Los Angeles	34°04′48″N 118°13′36″W
CA-265-L	Arroyo Seco Parkway, Avenue 26 Bridge	Extant	Reinforced concrete open-spandrel arch	1925	1999	Avenue 26	SR 110 (Arroyo Seco Parkway)	Los Angeles	Los Angeles	34°04′59″N 118°13′17″W
CA-265-O	Arroyo Seco Parkway, Pasadena Avenue Bridge	Extant	Reinforced concrete girder	1940	1999	Pasadena Avenue	SR 110 (Arroyo Seco Parkway)	Los Angeles	Los Angeles	34°05′11″N 118°12′46″W
CA-265-P	Arroyo Seco Parkway, Avenue 43 Bridge	Extant	Reinforced concrete girder	1939	1999	Avenue 43	SR 110 (Arroyo Seco Parkway)	Los Angeles	Los Angeles	34°05′36″N 118°12′23″W
CA-265-Q	Arroyo Seco Parkway, Sycamore Grove Pedestrian Bridge	Extant	Reinforced concrete box girder	1940	1999	Sycamore Grove Park trail	SR 110 (Arroyo Seco Parkway)	Los Angeles	Los Angeles	34°05′59″N 118°12′08″W
CA-265-R	Arroyo Seco Parkway, Avenue 52 Bridge	Extant	Reinforced concrete rigid frame	1940	1999	Avenue 52	SR 110 (Arroyo Seco Parkway)	Los Angeles	Los Angeles	34°06′11″N 118°11′47″W
CA-265-S	Arroyo Seco Parkway, Via Marisol Bridge	Extant	Reinforced concrete rigid frame	1940	1999	Via Marisol	SR 110 (Arroyo Seco Parkway)	Los Angeles	Los Angeles	34°06′14″N 118°11′28″W
CA-265-T	Arroyo Seco Parkway, Avenue 60 Bridge	Extant	Reinforced concrete closed-spandrel arch	1925	1999	Avenue 60	SR 110 (Arroyo Seco Parkway)	Los Angeles	Los Angeles	34°06′28″N 118°11′10″W
CA-265-U	Atchison, Topeka and Santa Fe Railroad Bridge	Extant	Trestle	1895	1999	Atchison, Topeka and Santa Fe Railway	SR 110 (Arroyo Seco Parkway)	Los Angeles	Los Angeles	34°06′39″N 118°11′04″W
CA-265-V	Arroyo Seco Parkway, Marmion Way Bridge	Extant	Reinforced concrete rigid frame	1940	1999	Marmion Way	SR 110 (Arroyo Seco Parkway)	Los Angeles	Los Angeles	34°06′40″N 118°10′50″W
CA-265-W	Arroyo Seco Parkway, York Boulevard Bridge	Extant	Reinforced concrete closed-spandrel arch	1912	1999	York Boulevard	SR 110 (Arroyo Seco Parkway)	Los Angeles	Los Angeles	34°06′46″N 118°10′38″W
CA-265-X	Arroyo Seco Parkway, Arroyo Seco Bridge	Extant	Reinforced concrete box girder	1939	1999	SR 110 (Arroyo Seco Parkway)	Arroyo Seco	Los Angeles	Los Angeles	34°07′04″N 118°10′05″W
CA-265-Z	Arroyo Seco Parkway, Arroyo Drive Bridge	Extant	Reinforced concrete rigid frame	1938	1999	Arroyo Drive	SR 110 (Arroyo Seco Parkway)	Los Angeles	Los Angeles	34°07′06″N 118°09′56″W
CA-265-AA	Arroyo Seco Parkway, Grand Avenue Bridge	Extant	Reinforced concrete rigid frame	1940	1999	Grand Avenue	SR 110 (Arroyo Seco Parkway)	Los Angeles	Los Angeles	34°07′08″N 118°09′47″W
CA-265-AB	Arroyo Seco Parkway, Orange Grove Avenue Bridge	Extant	Reinforced concrete rigid frame	1940	1999	Orange Grove Avenue	SR 110 (Arroyo Seco Parkway)	Los Angeles	Los Angeles	34°07′09″N 118°09′38″W
CA-265-AC	Arroyo Seco Parkway, Prospect Avenue Bridge	Extant	Reinforced concrete rigid frame	1940	1999	Prospect Avenue	SR 110 (Arroyo Seco Parkway)	Los Angeles	Los Angeles	34°07′09″N 118°09′31″W
CA-265-AD	Arroyo Seco Parkway, Meridian Avenue Bridge	Extant	Reinforced concrete rigid frame	1940	1999	Meridian Avenue	SR 110 (Arroyo Seco Parkway)	Los Angeles	Los Angeles	34°07′09″N 118°09′26″W
CA-265-AE	Arroyo Seco Parkway, Fremont Avenue Bridge	Extant	Reinforced concrete rigid frame	1940	1999	Fremont Avenue	SR 110 (Arroyo Seco Parkway)	Los Angeles	Los Angeles	34°07′09″N 118°09′11″W
CA-265-AF	Arroyo Seco Parkway, Fair Oaks Avenue Bridge	Extant	Reinforced concrete rigid frame	1940	1999	Fair Oaks Avenue	SR 110 (Arroyo Seco Parkway)	Los Angeles	Los Angeles	34°07′09″N 118°09′01″W
CA-266	Four Level Interchange	Extant	Reinforced concrete box girder	1953	1999	US 101 (Hollywood Freeway)	SR 110 (Arroyo Seco Parkway)	Los Angeles	Los Angeles	34°03′45″N 118°14′55″W
CA-271	Los Angeles River Bridges				2001		Los Angeles River	Los Angeles	Los Angeles	
CA-272	Glendale-Hyperion Viaduct	Extant	Reinforced concrete open-spandrel arch	1928	2001	Glendale Boulevard	Los Angeles River and I-5	Los Angeles	Los Angeles	34°06′49″N 118°15′55″W
CA-273	Fletcher Drive Bridge	Extant	Reinforced concrete T-beam	1928	2001	Fletcher Drive	Los Angeles River	Los Angeles	Los Angeles	34°06′31″N 118°15′13″W
CA-274	North Broadway Bridge	Extant	Reinforced concrete open-spandrel arch	1911	1999	North Broadway	Los Angeles River	Los Angeles	Los Angeles	34°04′19″N 118°13′30″W
CA-275	North Spring Street Bridge	Extant	Reinforced concrete open-spandrel arch	1928	1999	North Spring Street	Los Angeles River	Los Angeles	Los Angeles	34°04′14″N 118°13′29″W
CA-276	North Main Street Bridge	Extant	Reinforced concrete open-spandrel arch	1910	2001	North Main Street	Los Angeles River	Los Angeles	Los Angeles	34°04′03″N 118°13′28″W
CA-277	Macy Street Viaduct	Extant	Reinforced concrete open-spandrel arch	1926	2001	Cesar Chavez Avenue	Los Angeles River	Los Angeles	Los Angeles	34°03′18″N 118°13′38″W
CA-279	Fourth Street Bridge	Extant	Reinforced concrete open-spandrel arch	1928	2001	East 4th Street	South Lorena Street	Los Angeles	Los Angeles	34°02′03″N 118°11′51″W
CA-280	Fourth Street Viaduct	Extant	Reinforced concrete open-spandrel arch	1931	2001	East 4th Street	Los Angeles River	Los Angeles	Los Angeles	34°02′30″N 118°13′44″W
CA-282	Seventh Street Viaduct	Extant	Reinforced concrete closed-spandrel arch	1910	2001	East 7th Street	Los Angeles River	Los Angeles	Los Angeles	34°02′04″N 118°13′38″W
CA-284	Washington Boulevard Bridge	Extant	Reinforced concrete girder	1931	2001	East Washington Boulevard	Los Angeles River	Los Angeles	Los Angeles	34°01′03″N 118°13′24″W
CA-285	Sunset Boulevard Bridge	Extant	Steel built-up girder	1934	2001	Sunset Boulevard	Silver Lake Boulevard	Los Angeles	Los Angeles	34°04′57″N 118°16′22″W
CA-286	Franklin Avenue Bridge	Extant	Reinforced concrete open-spandrel arch	1926	2001	Franklin Avenue	Ravine	Los Angeles	Los Angeles	34°06′20″N 118°16′46″W
CA-288	Arroyo Seco Channel Pedestrian Bridge	Extant	Prestressed concrete I-beam	1951	1999	Arroyo Seco Park trail	Arroyo Seco	Los Angeles	Los Angeles	34°06′20″N 118°11′15″W
CA-289	Honcut Bridge	Replaced	Reinforced concrete girder	1914	2000	Honcut Road	South Honcut Creek	Loma Rica	Yuba	39°20′01″N 121°28′11″W
CA-297	Carquinez Bridge	Extant (eastbound); Replaced (westbound)	Cantilever	1958 (eastbound); 1927 (westbound)	2000	I-80	Carquinez Strait	Vallejo and Crockett	Solano and Contra Costa	38°03′39″N 122°13′33″W
CA-312	Honey Run Bridge	Demolished	Pratt truss	1886	2004	Honey Run Road	Butte Creek	Paradise	Butte	39°43′43″N 121°42′13″W
CA-313	Powder Works Bridge (Note: See also HAER No. PA-645, "Structural Study of Smith Trusses" for additional documentation)	Extant	Smith truss	1872	2004	Keystone Way	San Lorenzo River	Santa Cruz	Santa Cruz	37°00′38″N 122°02′38″W
CA-314	Knight's Ferry Bridge	Extant	Howe truss	1864	2004	Stockton–Sonora Road (former)	Stanislaus River	Knights Ferry	Stanislaus	37°49′10″N 120°39′49″W
CA-322	Napa River Railroad Bridge	Replaced	Steel built-up girder	1928	2002	Napa Valley Railroad	Napa River	Napa	Napa	38°18′00″N 122°16′56″W
CA-323	Wolf Creek Bridge	Replaced	Pratt truss	1897	2003	Auburn Road	Wolf Creek	Grass Valley	Nevada	39°09′20″N 121°04′41″W
CA-324	Sacramento River Water Treatment Plant Intake Pier and Access Bridge	Replaced	Suspension	1923	2003	Access to intake pier	Sacramento River	Sacramento	Sacramento	38°35′31″N 121°30′21″W
CA-325	Cottonwood Creek Bridge	Replaced	Reinforced concrete T-beam	1914	2003	Road 28	Cottonwood Creek	Madera	Madera	36°54′08″N 120°02′15″W
CA-327	First Street Bridge	Replaced	Stone arch	1863	2004	First Street	Napa Creek	Napa	Napa	38°17′58″N 122°17′05″W
CA-340	First Street Bridge	Replaced	Reinforced concrete girder	1915	2005	First Street	Napa River	Napa	Napa	38°18′9″N 122°16′45″W
CA-2266	Interurban Electric Railway Twenty-Sixth Street Junction Bridge	Demolished	Timber stringer	1938	1992	Interurban Electric Railway	Southern Pacific Railroad	Oakland	Alameda	37°49′15″N 122°17′30″W
CA-2270	Presidio of San Francisco, Doyle Drive and Veterans Highway Exchange	Replaced	Reinforced concrete T-beam	1933	2009	US 101 (Doyle Drive)	SR 1 (Veterans Boulevard)	San Francisco	San Francisco	37°48′11″N 122°28′09″W
CA-2274	East Poplar Avenue Underpass	Replaced	Steel built-up girder	1903	2010	Southern Pacific Railroad	East Poplar Avenue	San Mateo	San Mateo	37°34′26″N 122°19′50″W
CA-2275	Santa Inez Avenue Underpass	Replaced	Steel built-up girder	1903	2010	Southern Pacific Railroad	Santa Inez Avenue	San Mateo	San Mateo	37°34′21″N 122°19′43″W
CA-2276	Monte Diablo Avenue Underpass	Replaced	Steel built-up girder	1903	2010	Southern Pacific Railroad	Monte Diablo Avenue	San Mateo	San Mateo	37°34′17″N 122°19′38″W
CA-2277	Tilton Avenue Underpass	Replaced	Steel built-up girder	1903	2010	Southern Pacific Railroad	Tilton Avenue	San Mateo	San Mateo	37°34′12″N 122°19′33″W
CA-2289	Point Bonita Lighthouse Suspension Bridge	Extamt	Suspension	1954	2011	Point Bonita Lighthouse access	Pacific Ocean	Sausalito	Marin	37°48′56″N 122°31′46″W
CA-2291	Steamboat Slough Bridge	Extant	Strauss bascule	1924	2002	SR 160	Steamboat Slough	Courtland	Sacramento	38°18′17″N 121°34′29″W
CA-2295	Paintersville Bridge	Extant	Strauss bascule	1923	2002	SR 160	Sacramento River	Courtland	Sacramento	38°19′07″N 121°34′40″W
CA-2298	Cold Spring Canyon Bridge	Extant	Steel hinged arch	1963	2007	SR 154	Cold Spring Canyon	Santa Barbara	Santa Barbara	34°31′34″N 119°50′05″W
CA-2316	Haystack Landing Railroad Drawbridge	Replaced	Swing span	1904	2014	Northwestern Pacific Railroad, Southern Division	Petaluma River	Petaluma	Sonoma	38°13′42″N 122°36′50″W
CA-2324	Weber Avenue Overcrossing	Extant	Prestressed concrete I-beam	1953	2013	North Weber Avenue	East Belmont Avenue	Fresno	Fresno	36°45′01″N 119°48′47″W
CA-2325	Belmont Avenue Subway, Traffic Circle, and Bridge	Extant	Steel built-up girder	1932	2013	Southern Pacific Railroad	East Belmont Avenue	Fresno	Fresno	36°45′01″N 119°48′48″W
CA-2343	First Street Viaduct over Glendale Boulevard	Extant	Steel built-up girder	1942	2017	West 1st Street	Glendale Boulevard	Los Angeles	Los Angeles	34°03′43″N 118°15′35″W

== See also ==
- List of tunnels documented by the Historic American Engineering Record in California
