= Hospital Rock =

Hospital Rock may refer to several places:

- Hospital Rock (Tulelake, California)
- Hospital Rock (Three Rivers, California), located in Sequoia National Park
- Hospital Rock (Oahu, Hawaii)
