= First Street Bridge (Napa, California) =

- U.S. National Register of Historic Places
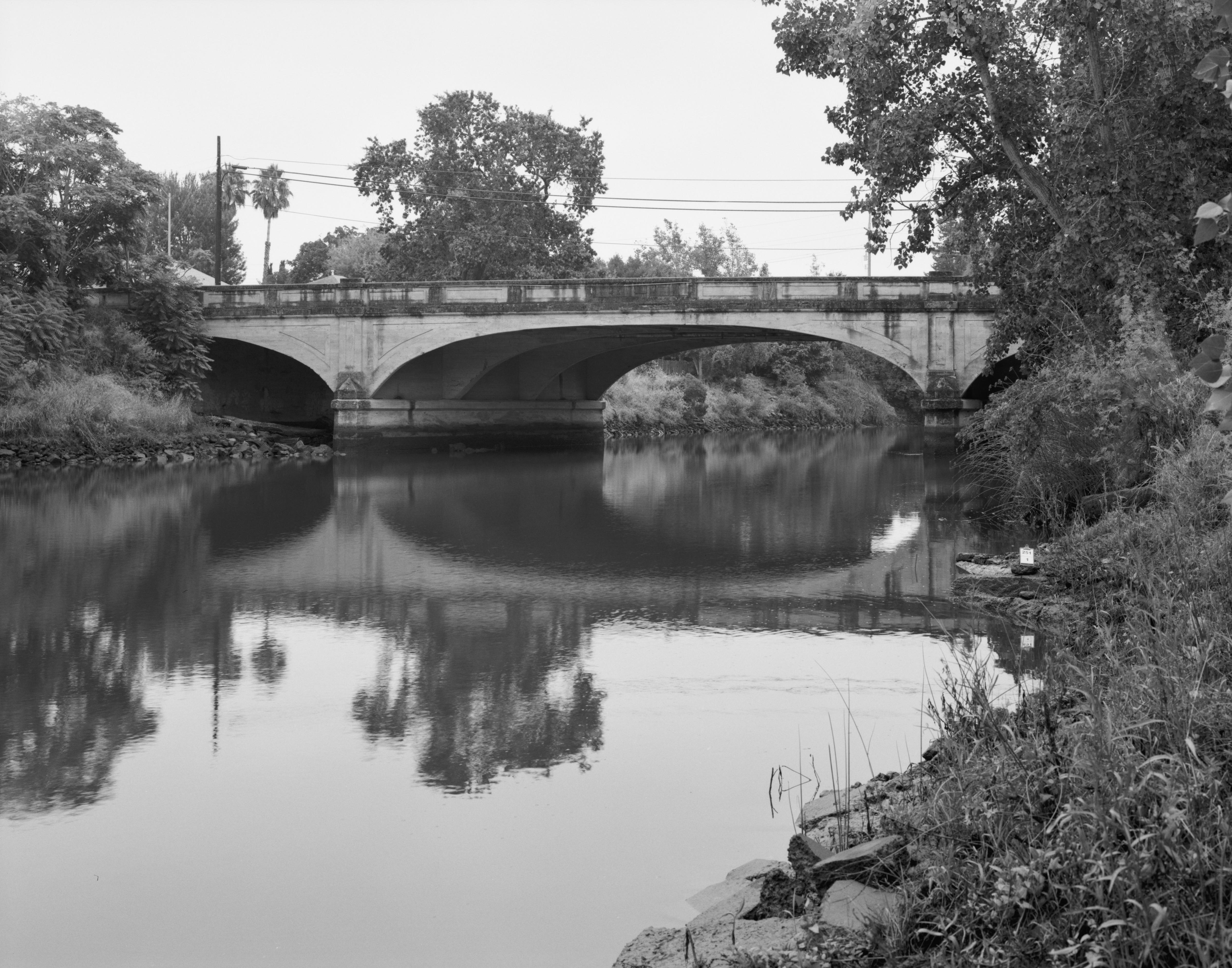

- Location within California
- Location: First Street across the Napa River, Napa, California
- Coordinates: 38°18′06″N 122°16′42″W
- Area: less than one acre
- Built: 1914
- Built by: C. H. Gildersleeve
- Architect: Leonard and Day
- Architectural style: Concrete girder bridge
- MPS: Highway Bridges of California MPS
- NRHP reference No.: 04000774
- Added to NRHP: August 5, 2004

The First Street Bridge in Napa, California carries First Street over the Napa River. It was built in 1914 and was listed on the National Register of Historic Places in 2004.

It is a reinforced concrete bridge with three spans. Its total length is 155 feet (47 m); the center span is 50 feet (15 m) and the two side spans are each 35 feet (11 m). It is 61 feet (19 m) wide and carries a two-lane roadway.

The bridge was designed by the engineering firm of Leonard and Day, whose senior partner, John B. Leonard "was perhaps the state's most important designer of concrete bridges in the first two decades of the last century."

It was built by contractor C. H. Gildersleeve.

It is structurally a concrete girder bridge although it has the picturesque appearance of a Luten arch bridge.

== See also ==
- List of bridges documented by the Historic American Engineering Record in California
