= Yosemite Valley Bridges =

- U.S. National Register of Historic Places
- U.S. Historic district
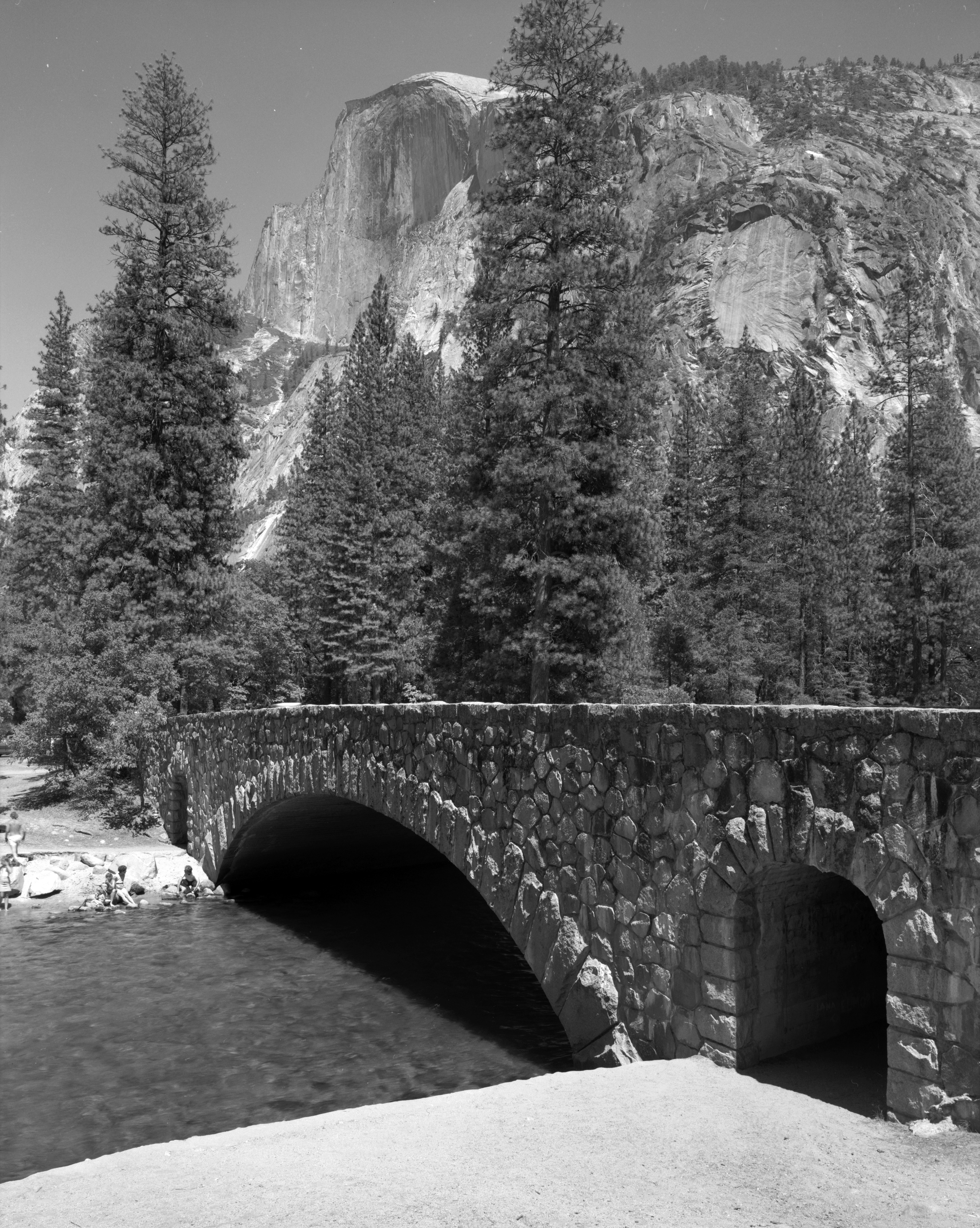
- Clark Bridge, with Half Dome in the background

- Location within California Location within the United States
- Nearest city: Yosemite Village, California
- Coordinates: 37°43′58″N 119°36′0″W
- Area: 0 acres (0 ha)
- Built: 1922
- Architect: National Park Service
- Architectural style: Rustic
- NRHP reference No.: 77000160
- Added to NRHP: November 25, 1977

The Yosemite Valley Bridges are eight bridges in the Yosemite Valley of Yosemite National Park, most of them spanning the Merced River. Five of them were built in 1928, with the remainder built between 1921 and 1933. The bridges feature a concrete structure faced with local stone, in an elliptical or three-centred arch configuration. They are notable for their uniform character and for their conformance to tenets of the National Park Service rustic style. Design work for the seven newer bridges was by George D. Whittle of the San Francisco District Office of the U.S. Bureau of Public Roads for the National Park Service. Concrete bridges were chosen at the urging of Thomas Chalmers Vint of the Park Service, in lieu of alternative designs for steel truss bridges, or suspension bridges suggested by the park superintendent.

== Individual bridges ==
The Yosemite Creek Bridge is the oldest, carrying Northside Drive and spanning Yosemite Creek below Yosemite Falls. Built in 1922, it spans 50 feet (15 m) in a single arch of reinforced concrete faced with granite. The bridge is 24 feet (7.3 m) wide, and was built at a cost of $32,000. The bridge originally featured lanterns on the buttresses at either end of the bridge. It replaced an earlier bridge, referred to as "the little red bridge."

The Ahwahnee Bridge was built in 1928 across the Merced with three arches, one spanning 42 feet (13 m) and the others spanning 39 feet (12 m), for a total length of 122 feet (37 m). The bridge is 39 feet (12 m) wide with a 27-foot (8.2 m) roadway, a 5-foot (1.5 m) sidewalk and a 7-foot (2.1 m) bridle path. It carries the Mirror Lake Road, framing a view of Half Dome for eastbound traffic. Cost was $59,913.09.

The Clark Bridge was also built in 1928 with a single 75.5-foot (23.0 m) semi-elliptical main span over the Merced flanked by two round-arched subways for horse-and-rider traffic, 7 feet (2.1 m) wide by 11 feet (3.4 m) high through the bridge's abutments. Cost was $40,061.22. The bridge carries the 27-foot (8.2 m) Curry Stables Road, a 5-foot (1.5 m) sidewalk and a 7-foot (2.1 m) bridle path.

The Pohono Bridge (1928) spans 80 feet (24 m) over the Merced, carrying the 27-foot (8.2 m) Southside Drive and a 5-foot (1.5 m) bridle path, at a cost of $29,081.55.

The Sugar Pine Bridge (1928), also historically known as the Kenneyville Bridge No. 2, spans 106 feet (32 m) at a five-degree skew across the Merced, with a 27-foot (8.2 m) roadway, a 5-foot (1.5 m) sidewalk and a 7-foot (2.1 m) sidewalk. It carries the Mirror Lake Road. The longest span of the eight bridges, the cost was $73,507.44. The bridge was named for a large sugar pine that grew to the north of the eastern bridge abutment.

The Tenaya Creek Bridge (1928) spans Tenaya Creek with a single 56.75-foot (17.30 m) arch at a 25-degree skew on the Happy Isles-Mirror Lake Road. The bridge carries the standard roadway, bridle path and sidewalk. Cost was $37,749.16.

The Happy Isles Bridge on the Happy Isles Road over the Merced was built in 1929 with one span of 75 feet (23 m) and two equestrian subways in its abutments similar to those of the Clark Bridge, its near twin. The bridge's total length is 126 feet (38 m). Cost was $46,673.03.

The Stoneman Bridge (1933) resembles the Clark and Happy Isles bridges, with a 72-foot (22 m) main span over the Merced carrying the 27-foot (8.2 m) Northside Drive and two 6-foot (1.8 m) sidewalks. The equestrian subways in the abutments were slightly enlarged in width to 8.5 feet (2.6 m) and were extended out from the surface of the wing walls for greater emphasis. It is located at the Camp Curry intersection. Cost was $71,675.08. The bridge replaced a wooden bridge that had carried the former "Royal Arch Avenue" to the Stoneman Hotel, which had been demolished by the 1920s. Construction on the bridge was started by Sullivan and Sullivan of Oakland, California, but was terminated when the Bureau of Public Roads lost confidence in the contractor's ability to carry out the work. The bridge was completed by the Portland, Oregon firm of Kueckenberg & Wittman.

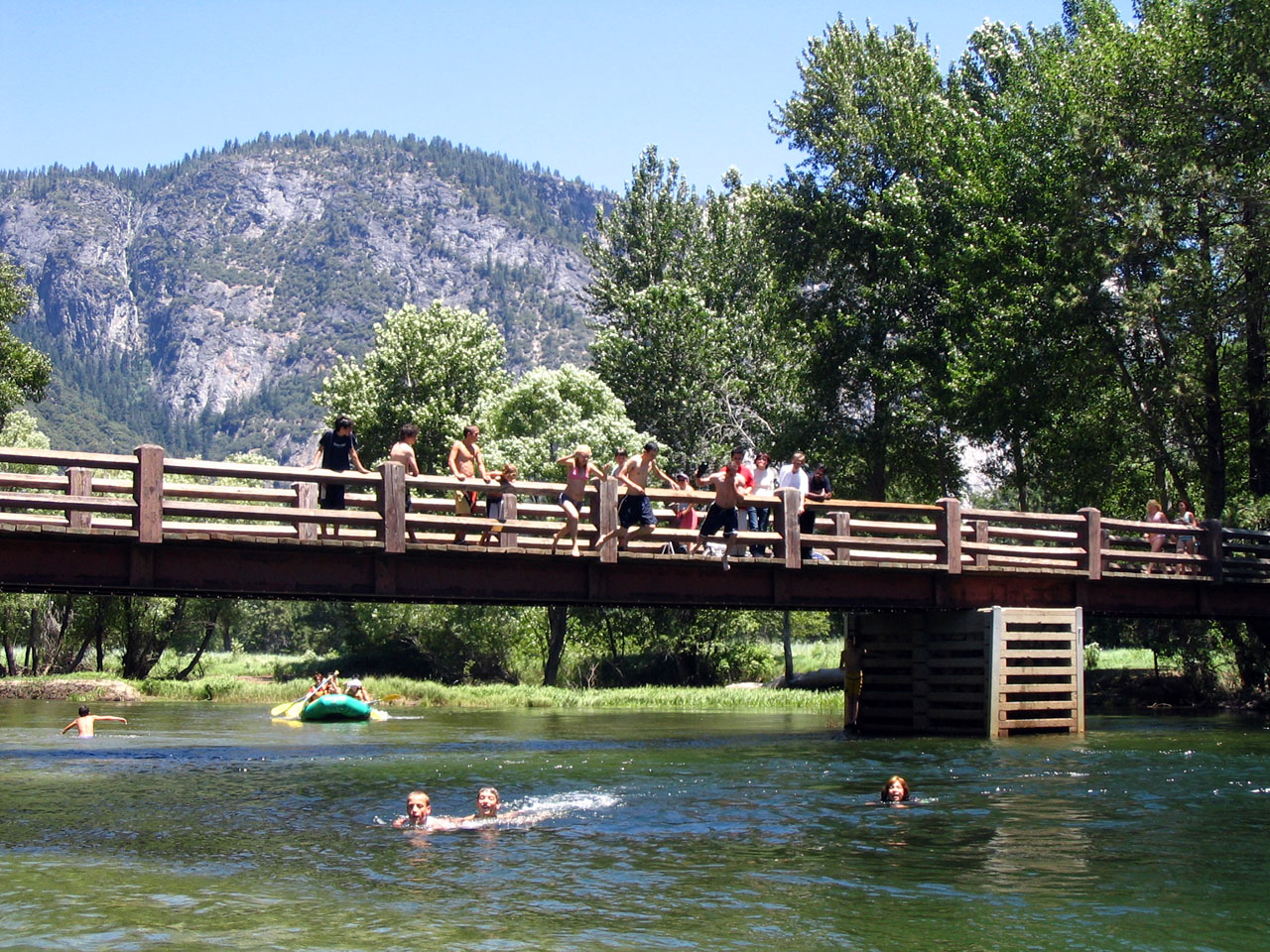
A group of three jumping into the deep section of the Merced River

The Swinging Bridge, also known as Swinging Bridge Picnic Area, is a scenic spot in Yosemite National Park. It offers a view of Yosemite Falls and the Merced River. Contrary to its name, the bridge itself does not swing. The original bridge was replaced with a fixed bridge after it was damaged by a flood in 1964. Severe flooding in 2018 caused debris such as trees and mattresses to stick to the sides of the bridge. The land in the area resembles that of a beach. The area on both sides of the bridge has mostly shallow water with a few areas from 6 feet (1.8 m) to 12 feet (3.7 m) deep.

The bridges were listed as a historic district on the National Register of Historic Places on November 25, 1977.

== Future status ==
The National Park Service will release a Draft Environmental Impact Statement for their Merced River Plan in October 2012. The DEIS may contain a proposal to remove the Ahwahnee, Stoneman, and Sugar Pine bridges. The Merced River was included into the Wild and Scenic River system by Congress and signed into law by President Ronald Reagan in 1987. The NPS is required to consider several alternatives before implementing a final plan to maintain a free-flowing river as described in the law. One option being considered is the removal of the three bridges, but it is not certain the bridge removal option will be included in the Merced River Plan DEIS. Once the DEIS is released, there will be a 90-day public comment period.

== See also ==
- List of bridges documented by the Historic American Engineering Record in California
