= Haystack Landing Bridge =

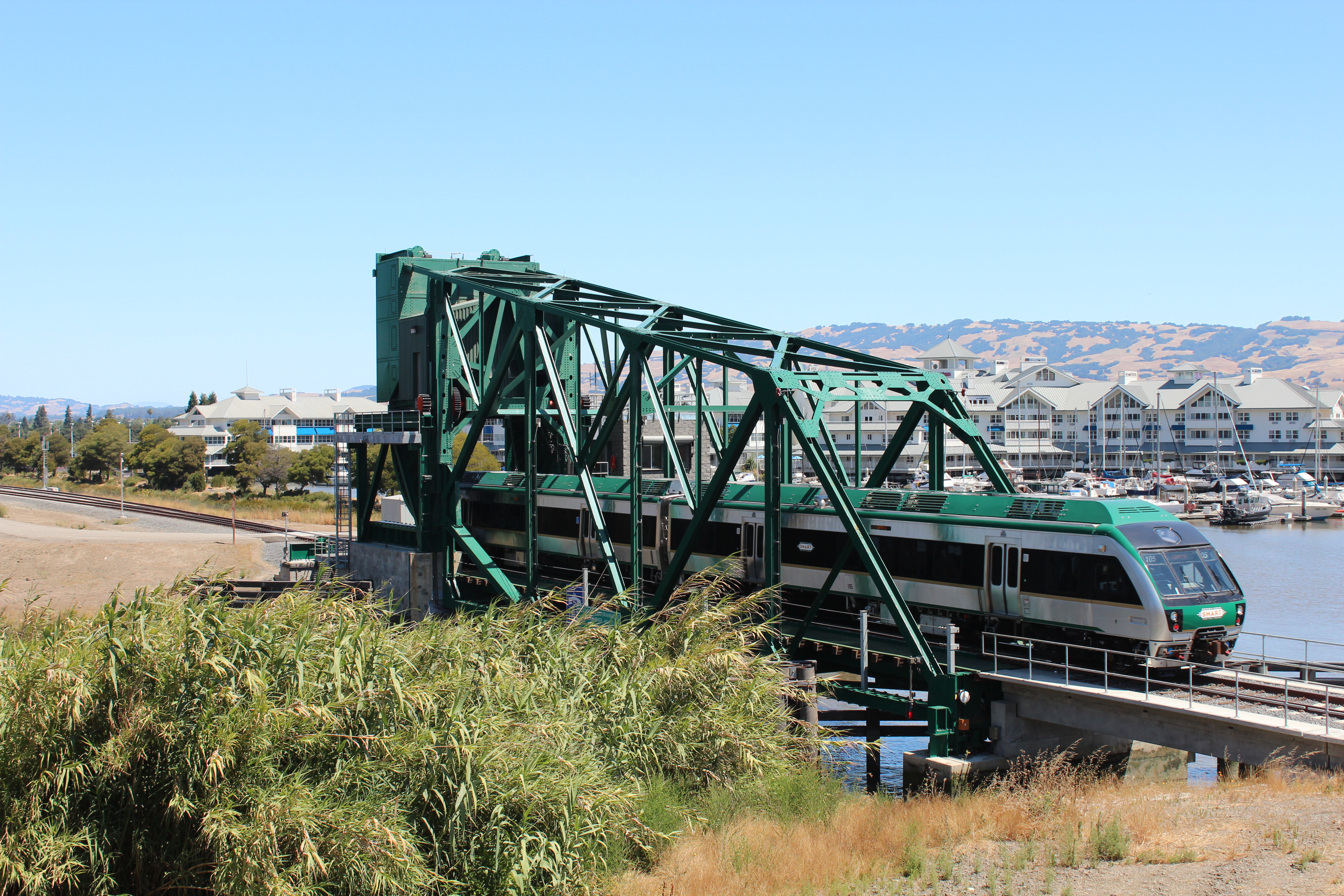
- Coordinates: 38°13′42″N 122°36′50″W
- Crosses: Petaluma River
- Other name: McNear Bridge
- Owner: Sonoma-Marin Area Rail Transit

Characteristics
- Design: Single-Leaf Bascule
- Material: Steel
- Total length: 124.5 ft (37.9 m)

Rail characteristics
- Track gauge: Standard

History
- Constructed by: American Bridge Company and Pittsburgh-Des Moines Steel Co.
- Built: 1987

Location
- Interactive map of Haystack Landing Bridge

The Haystack Landing Bridge is a railroad bridge owned by Sonoma-Marin Area Rail Transit (SMART) at Haystack Landing in Petaluma, California. The original Haystack Landing bridge, which was built in 1903 and installed in 1904, was a Warren truss swing bridge built by the Pennsylvania Steel Company. It was operated by buttons on the approach trestles, and had a 5-horsepower (3.7 kW) electric motor, as well as fabric belts and bevel gears. The turntable upon which it rotated had a diameter of 10 feet (3.0 m). When planning out their commuter rail system, SMART estimated that it would cost approximately 20 million dollars for the bridge to be used for passenger service, so they opted for the cheaper option of buying a used drawbridge. They decided upon the old Galveston Causeway railroad bridge, that was planned to be scrapped.

SMART budgeted around 16 million dollars for the new bridge and purchased the 2.2-million-pound (1,000 t) bridge for 4.2 million dollars. Officials say the bridge should be good for around 75 to 80 years of passenger rail service. The new bridge has a host of new electrical systems, such as programmable logic control and flux vector variable frequency drives. The bridge also has integrated operating systems.

== See also ==
- List of bridges documented by the Historic American Engineering Record in California
