= List of bridges documented by the Historic American Engineering Record in Nevada =

This is a list of bridges documented by the Historic American Engineering Record in the US state of Nevada.

== Bridges ==
Survey No.	Name (as assigned by HAER)	Status	Type	Built	Documented	Carries	Crosses	Location	County	Coordinates
NV-7	Muddy River Bridge	Replaced	Warren truss	1933	1986	Glendale Boulevard	Muddy River	Glendale	Clark	36°39′48″N 114°34′17″W
NV-8	East Verdi Bridge	Replaced	Reinforced concrete open-spandrel arch	1939	1988	SR 425	Truckee River	Verdi	Washoe	39°31′18″N 119°58′30″W
NV-9	West Verdi Bridge	Replaced	Reinforced concrete open-spandrel arch	1939	1988	SR 425	Truckee River	Verdi	Washoe	39°30′50″N 119°59′49″W
NV-10	Riverside Bridge	Replaced	Reinforced concrete closed-spandrel arch	1920	1989	Booth Street	Truckee River	Reno	Washoe	39°31′13″N 119°49′35″W
NV-13	Center Street Bridge	Replaced	Reinforced concrete open-spandrel arch	1926	1993	Center Street	Truckee River	Reno	Washoe	39°31′32″N 119°48′41″W
NV-14	Virginia Street Bridge	Replaced	Reinforced concrete closed-spandrel arch	1905	1993	Virginia Street	Truckee River	Reno	Washoe	39°31′30″N 119°48′46″W
NV-38	Maggie Creek Bridge	Demolished	Bowstring arch truss		2002		Maggie Creek	Elko	Elko	40°44′19″N 116°06′14″W
NV-40-A	Route No. 1–Overton–Lake Mead Road, Culverts and Headwalls	Extant	Culvert	1938	2002	Overton–Lake Mead Road	Unnamed streams in Lake Mead National Recreation Area	Overton	Clark	36°26′22″N 114°23′1″W
