= Generals' Highway Stone Bridges =

- U.S. National Register of Historic Places
- U.S. Historic district
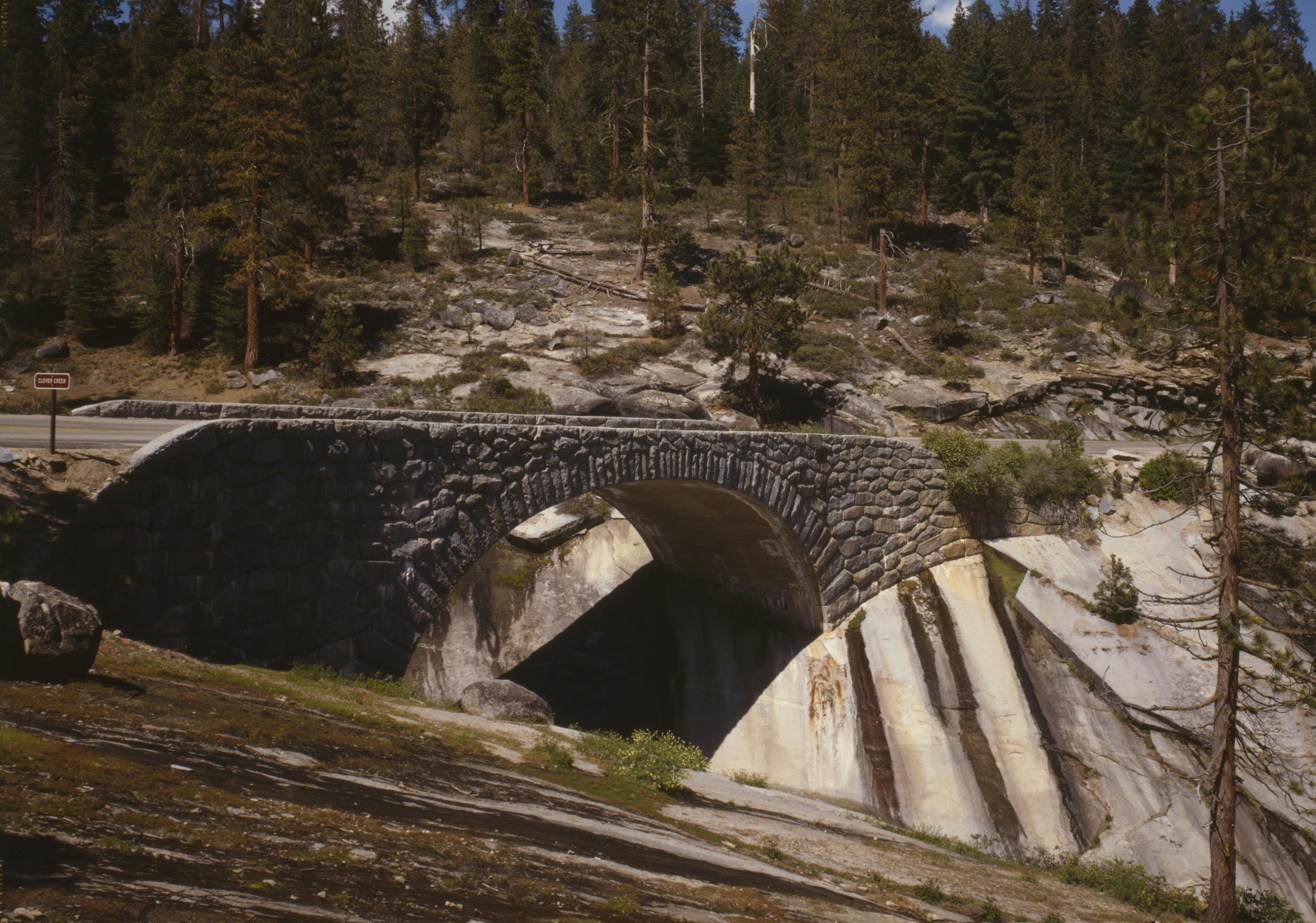
- General's Highway Stone Bridge

- Location within California Location within the United States
- Nearest city: Mineral King, California
- Coordinates: 36°36′27″N 118°44′46″W
- Built: 1930
- Architect: Multiple; National Park Service
- Architectural style: National Park Service Rustic
- NRHP reference No.: 78000284
- Added to NRHP: September 13, 1978

The Generals' Highway Stone Bridges, built in 1930, are part of the Generals' Highway from the General Grant Grove of giant sequoias in Kings Canyon National Park (then called General Grant National Park) through Sequoia National Park. One bridge spans the Marble Fork of the Kaweah River in a wooded setting, while the other, similar bridge spans Clover Creek in a bare canyon.

== Design ==
The bridges are typically reinforced concrete barrel arches with uncoursed stone facing on the sides, in a National Park Service Rustic style. The concrete is not visible to passersby, whose attention is taken by the mass of the masonry. Of the two, the Clover Creek bridge is the more impressive, due to its setting. The bridges were designed by the National Park Service Branch of Plans and Designs in cooperation with the Bureau of Public Roads.

The design inspiration for the bridges was the Westchester County, New York parkway system, which included the Bronx River and Hutchinson River parkways. The National Park Service sent two designers to observe the construction, and one of these, John Wosky, was the designer of the Generals' Highway bridges. Wosky developed the architectural design of the Marble Fork bridge in the fall of 1928, and structural plans were developed by the Bureau of Public Roads in January 1929. The Clover Creek bridge was designed in 1930, with construction the same year on both bridges. The contractor for both bridges was W. A. Bechtel.

Drawing from the Historic American Engineering Record

== See also ==
- List of bridges documented by the Historic American Engineering Record in California
