= Point Bonita Lighthouse =

Lighthouse in California, US

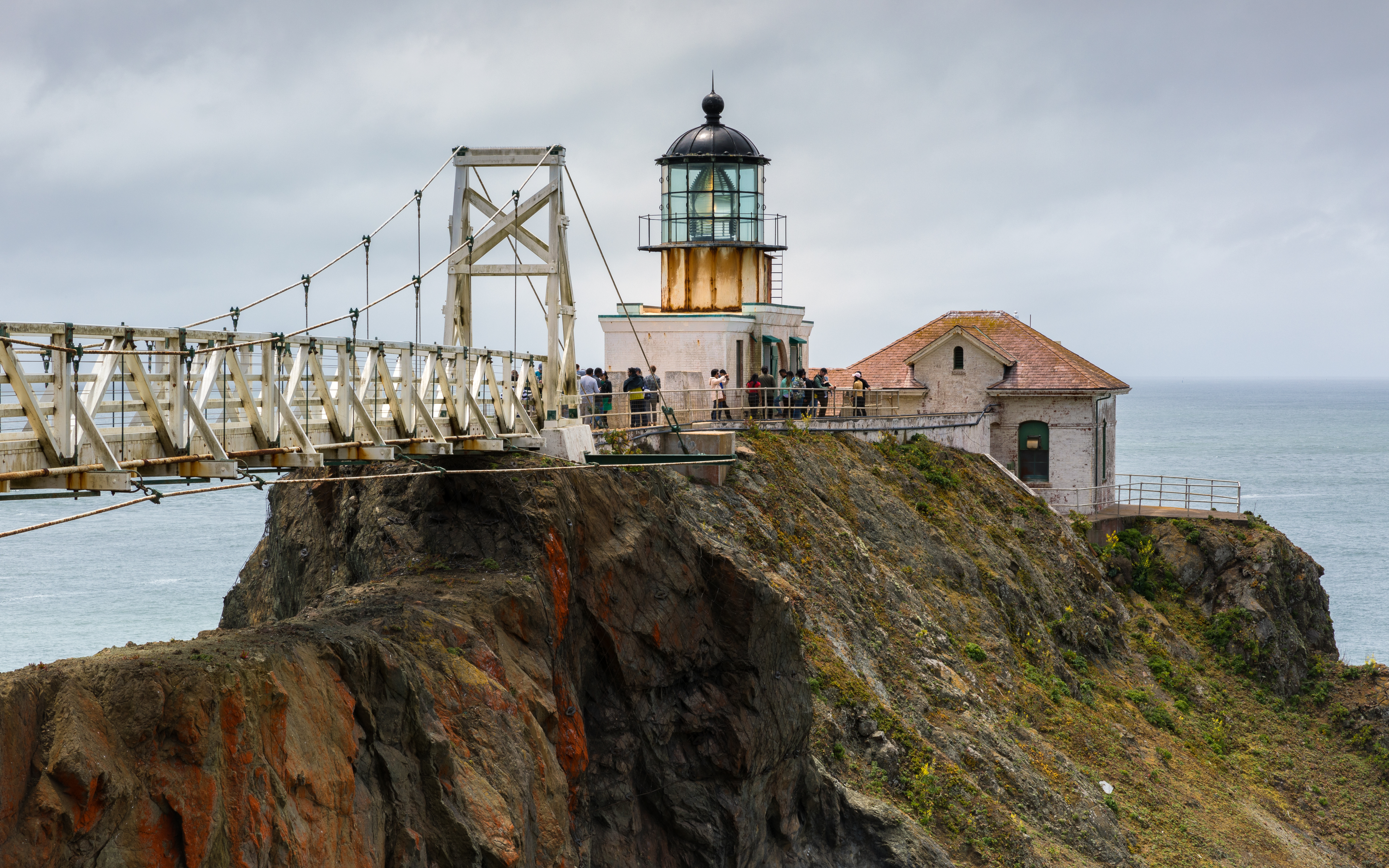
- Point Bonita Lighthouse in 2018
- Location: San Francisco Bay; California; United States
- Coordinates: 37.815614°N 122.529578°W

Tower
- Constructed: 1855 (first)
- Foundation: masonry basement
- Construction: brick and cement building
- Automated: 1980
- Height: 33 ft (10 m)
- Shape: hexagonal tower with balcony and lantern on fog signal building
- Markings: white tower, black lantern dome
- Operator: Golden Gate National Recreation Area
- Heritage: National Register of Historic Places listed place
- Fog signal: 2 blasts every 30s

Light
- First lit: 1877 (current)
- Focal height: 124 ft (38 m)
- Lens: Second order Fresnel lens
- Range: 18 nautical miles (33 km; 21 mi)
- Characteristic: Oc W 4s.
- Point Bonita Light Station
- U.S. National Register of Historic Places
- U.S. Historic district
- Area: 14 acres (5.7 ha)
- Built: 1855
- Architectural style: Lighthouse
- MPS: Light Stations of California MPS
- NRHP reference No.: 91001099
- Added to NRHP: September 3, 1991

Point Bonita Lighthouse is a lighthouse located at Point Bonita at the San Francisco Bay entrance in the Marin Headlands. It was the last staffed lighthouse on the California coast. Point Bonita Lighthouse was added to the National Register of Historic Places in 1991.

== History ==
More than 300 boats ran aground near the Golden Gate during the California Gold Rush years, requiring a lighthouse.

The original Point Bonita Lighthouse, a 56-foot (17 m) brick tower, was built in 1855 at 306 feet (93 m) above sea level with a second order Fresnel lens, which was too high. Unlike the East Coast of the United States, the West Coast has dense high fog, which leaves lower elevations clear. Since the original light was so high, it was often cloaked in fog and could not be seen from the sea. As a result, the lighthouse was moved to its current location at 124 feet (38 m) above sea level in 1877. To access the new site, a 118-foot (36 m) long tunnel was hand carved through hard rock.

The lighthouse had the first fog signal on the West Coast, in the form of a 24-pounder siege gun. Up until 1940, the lighthouse could be reached by a trail, but erosion caused the trail to crumble into the sea. A wooden walkway was installed, but when it became treacherous, a suspension bridge was built in 1954. Point Bonita Lighthouse is the only lighthouse in the United States which can only be reached by a suspension bridge.

The suspension bridge underwent repairs in 1979 and again 12 years later, but the metal components were not able to stand up to the sea spray. As a result, the suspension bridge to the light house was closed to public access on January 6, 2010. According to the Federal Highway Administration, the bridge, which was 56 years old, had started to rust. It was replaced by a new span, which opened April 13, 2012.

The new bridge construction cost a little over $1 million. It is made of tropical hardwood with steel suspension cables and attachments.

The Point Bonita Suspension Bridge in the Golden Gate National Recreation Area closed indefinitely for repairs, park officials announced on August 19, 2024. Visitors will still be able to access the 0.5 miles (0.80 km) trail leading to the historic landmark, but access to the lighthouse itself will be suspended. This latest closure allows park officials to conduct a more thorough inspection of the 200-foot (61 m)-long bridge. "Wind gusts and sea spray make Point Bonita an inhospitable place for infrastructure, We don't have a timeline for its reopening yet, but we'll share updates on our website and social media." said Julian Espinoza, a spokesperson for the Golden Gate recreation area.

The United States Coast Guard currently maintains the light and fog signal.

=== Public access ===
The lighthouse is accessible to the public during limited hours (12:30–3:30 p.m.) on Sundays and Mondays, as well as on ranger-led interpretive sunset hikes, which requires a sign-up. Access to the bridge is barred at other times by a metal door on the shore end of the tunnel.

The lighthouse closed in March 2020 for the COVID-19 pandemic, but resumed tours two years later on February 20, 2022.

== Gallery ==
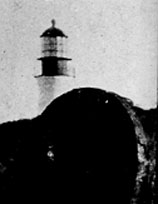
1856 Point Bonita Light – U.S. Coast Guard Archive

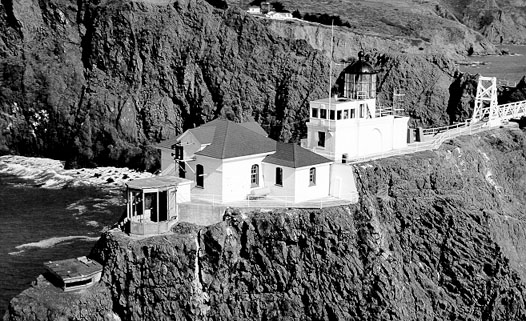
Point Bonita Light – U.S. Coast Guard Archive

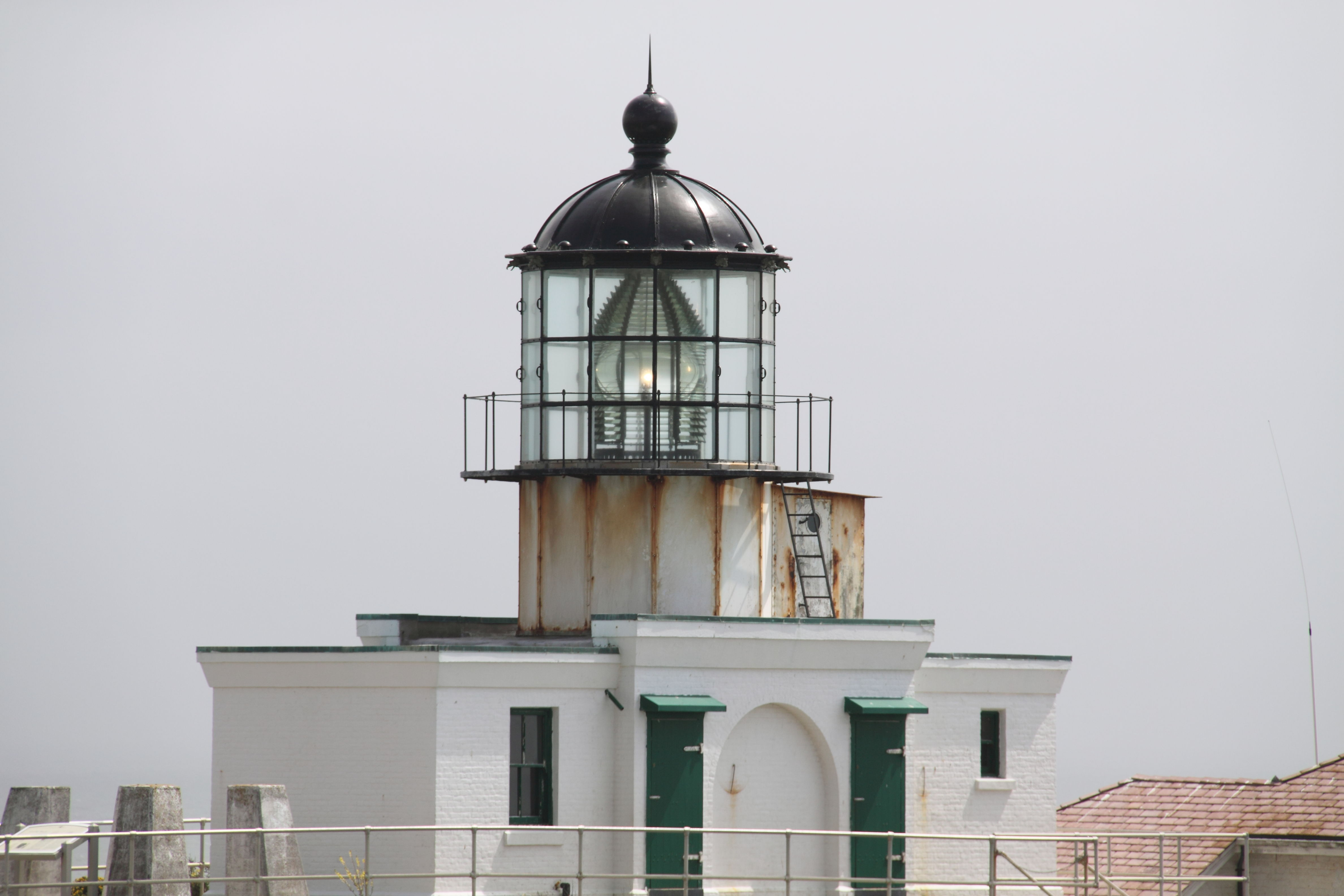
Point Bonita Light detail

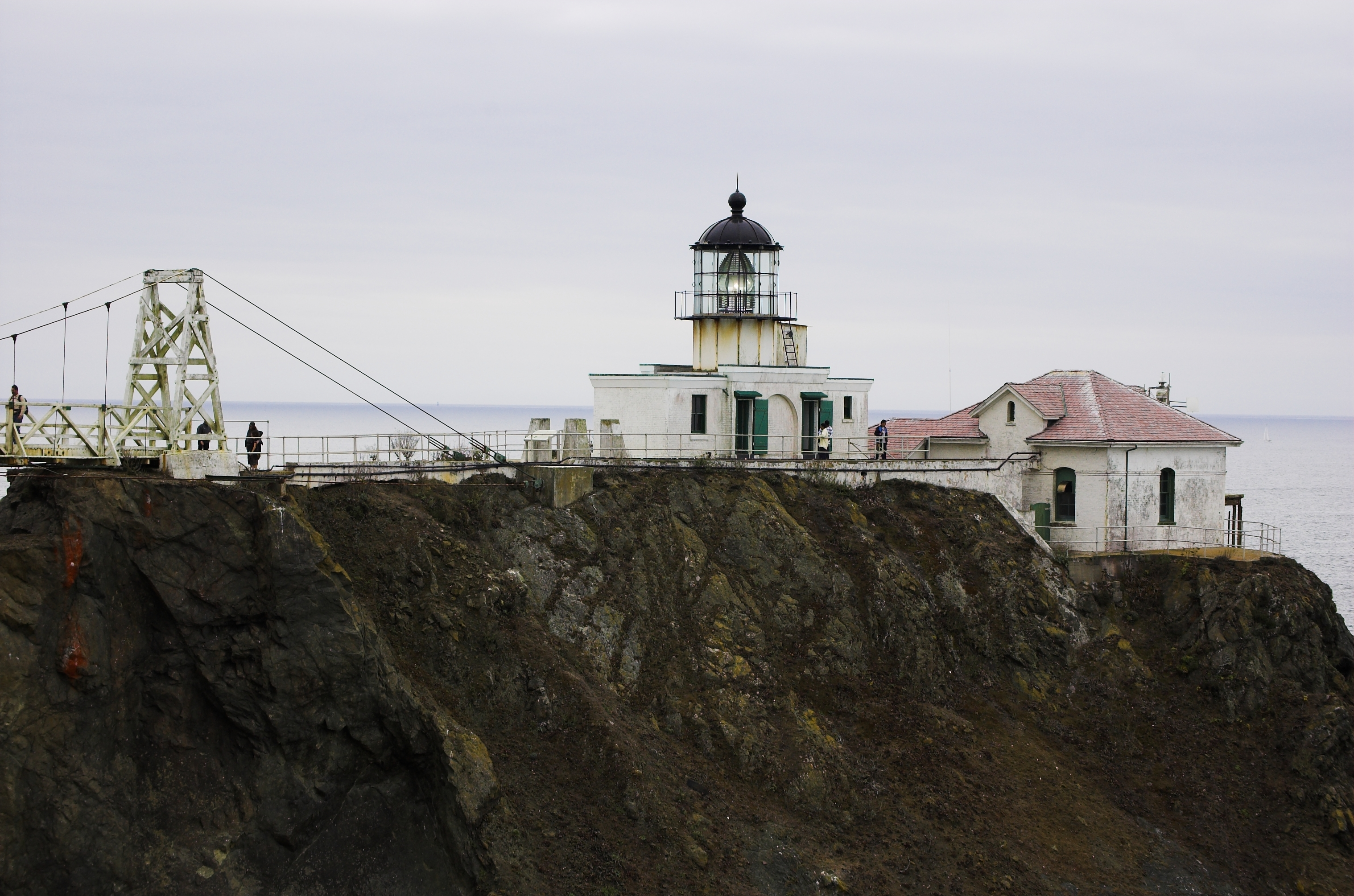
View of the lighthouse

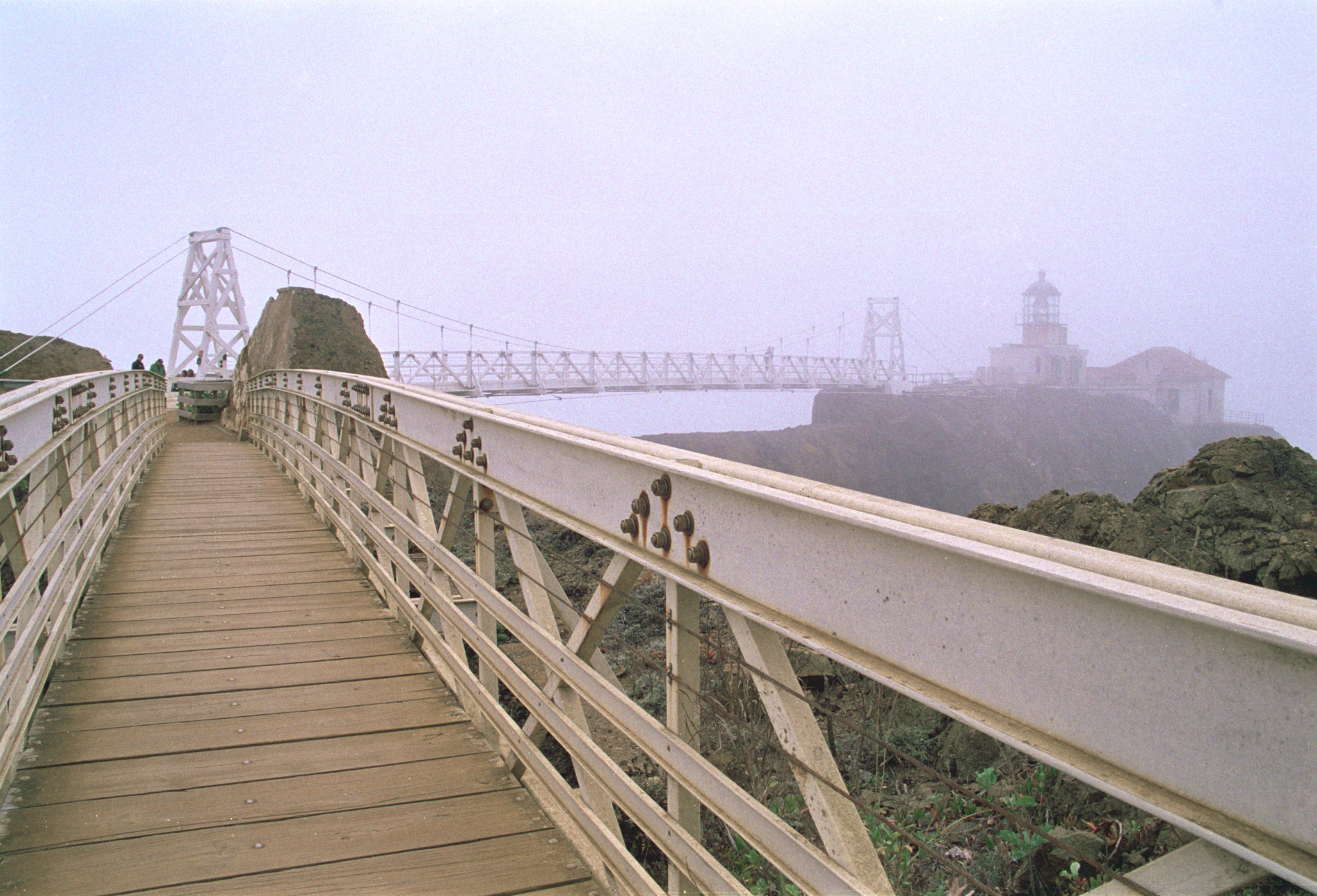
Point Bonita lighthouse

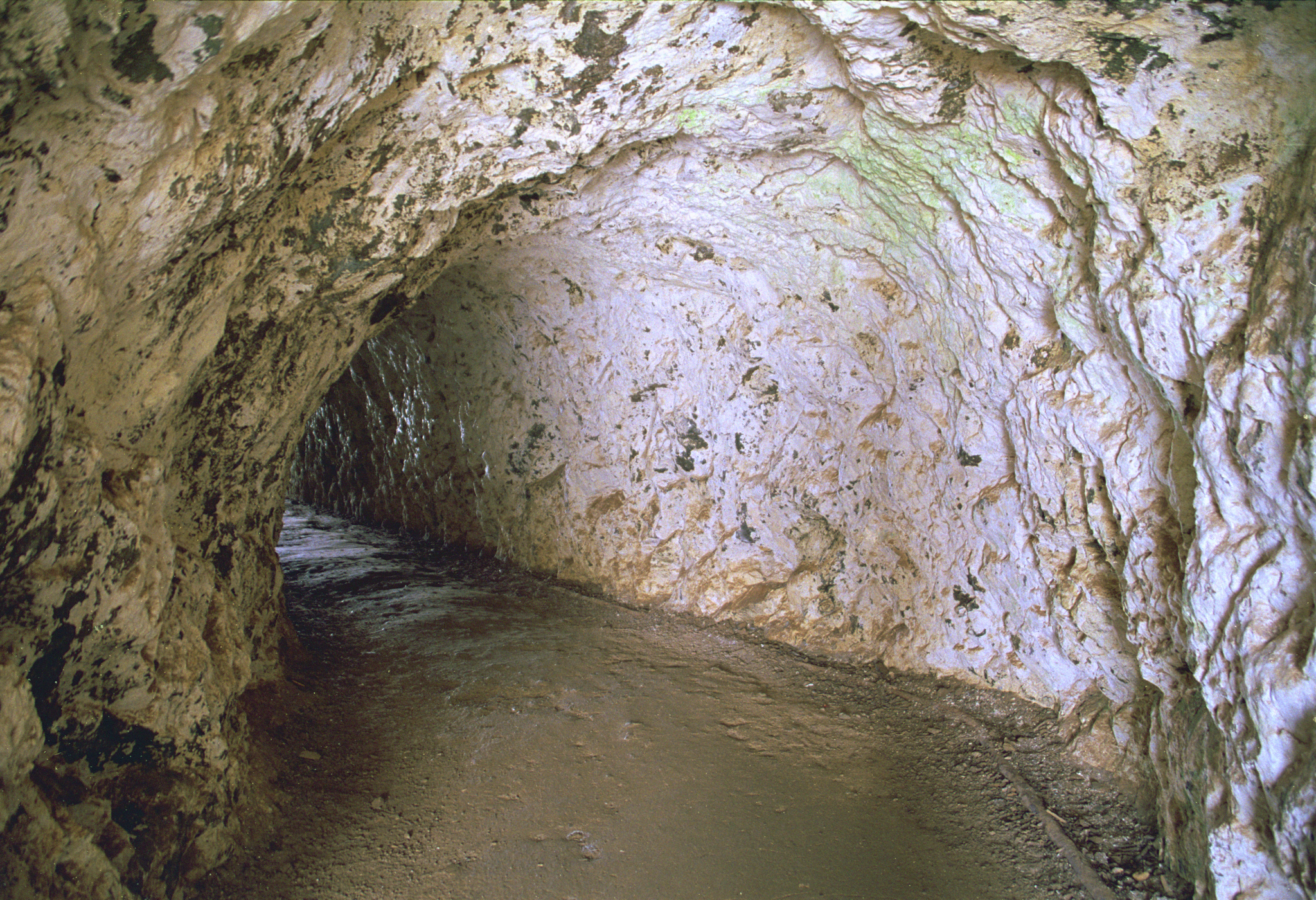
Hand carved tunnel leading to lighthouse

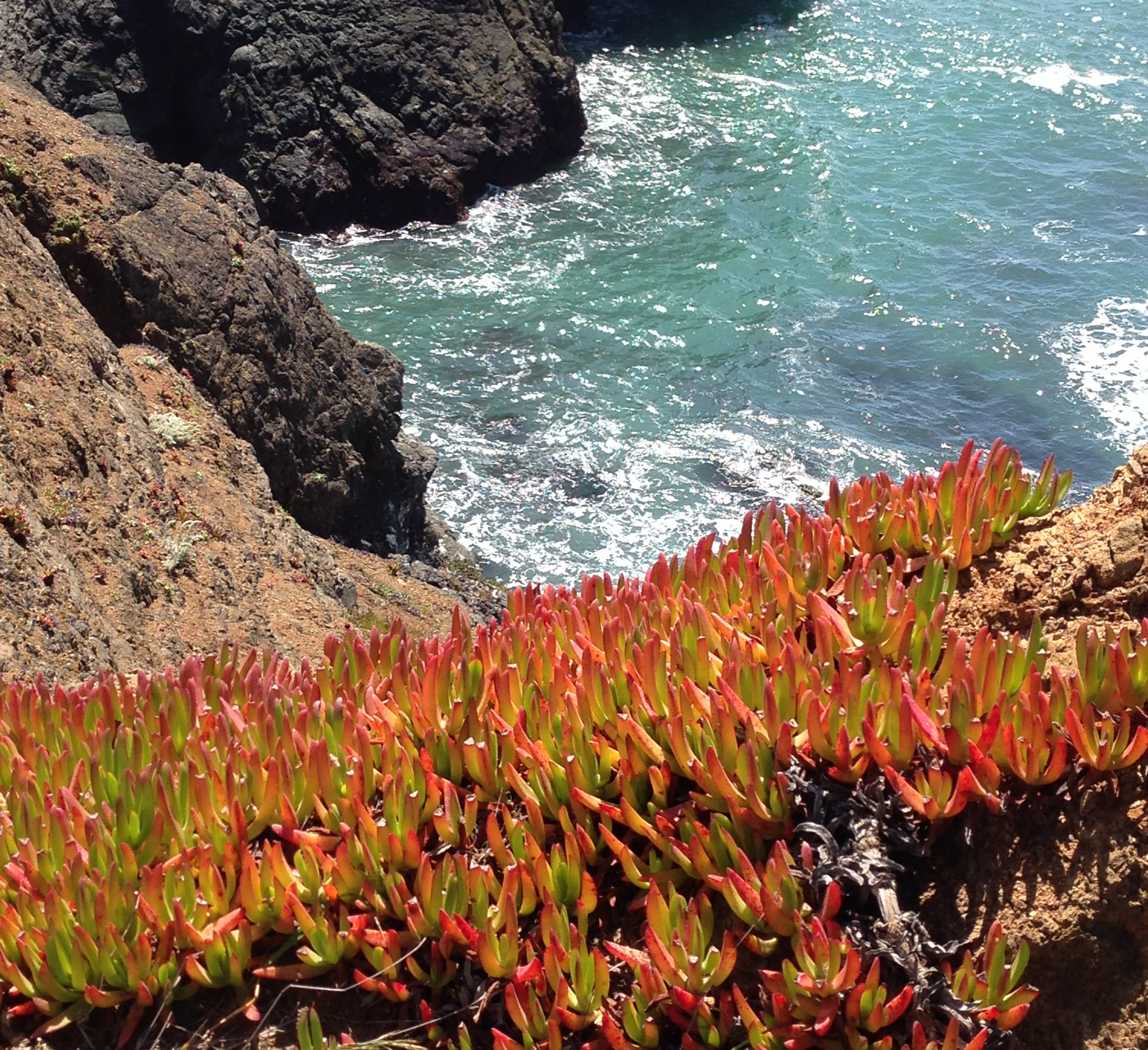
Invasive Ice Plant near Point Bonita lighthouse

== In popular media ==
On the television show Murder in the First the lighthouse was a setting at the end of the second-season episode "Schizofrenzy".

The lighthouse can be found in the video game Watch Dogs 2.

== See also ==
- List of bridges documented by the Historic American Engineering Record in California
- List of lighthouses in the United States
