= John B. Leonard =

American architect

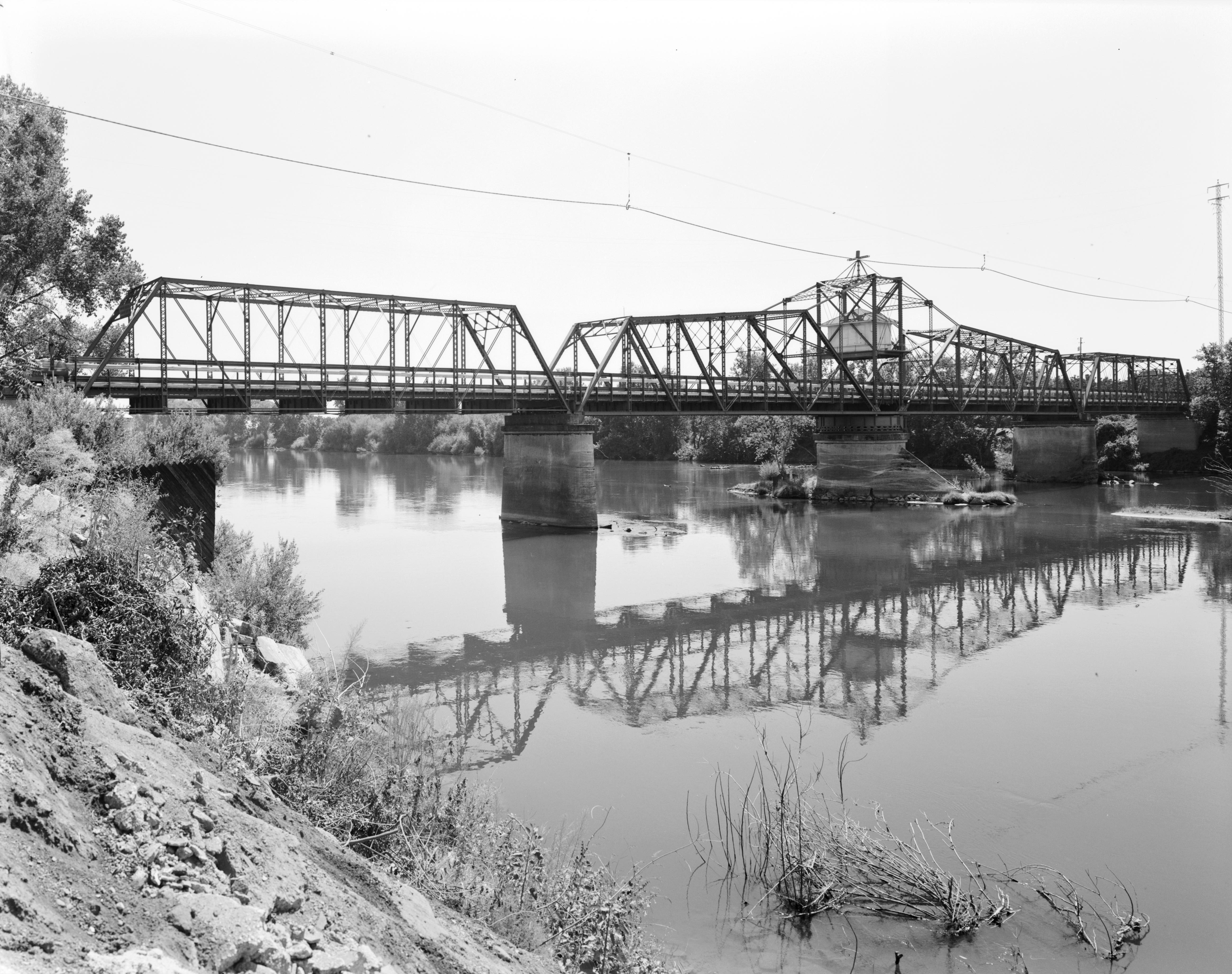
Leonard's Gianella Bridge, Glenn, California, one of his few steel designs (demolished)

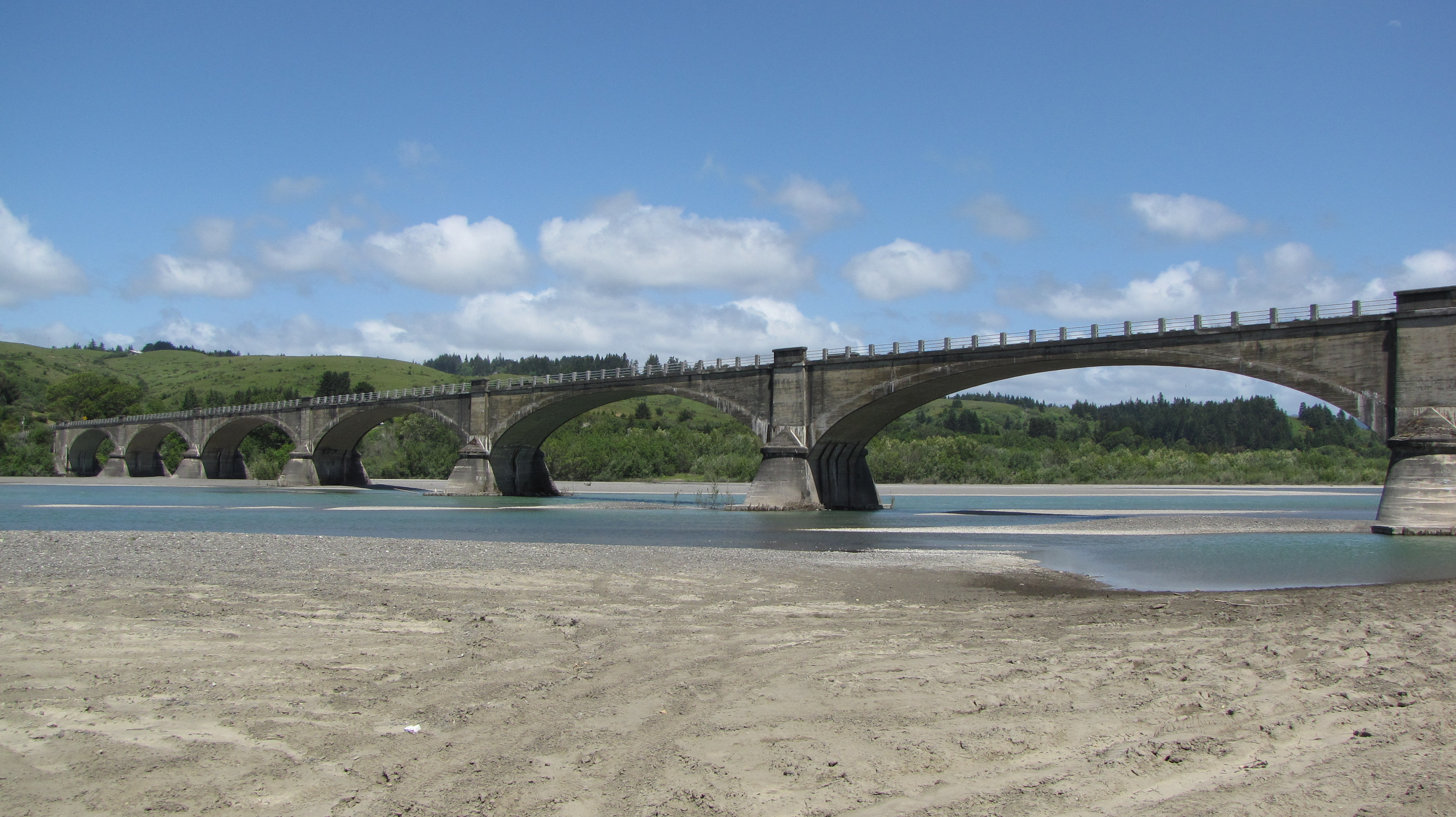
Fernbridge, over the Eel River near Ferndale, California, 1911 (extant)

John Buck Leonard (1864–1945) was a pioneering bridge engineer and architect, early advocate for reinforced concrete, working mainly in northern California.

== Life ==
Leonard was born in Union City, Michigan, and educated at Michigan State University and the University of Michigan before going west in 1888. After brief periods in San Diego, California and Los Angeles, he settled in San Francisco. From 1889 he was employed there doing iron and steel engineering for various firms, including the Southern Pacific Railroad. Leonard opened his own consulting civil engineering office in 1904.

Even in the aftermath of the 1906 San Francisco earthquake, resistance to fireproof reinforced concrete was strong. Leonard's analyses of concrete's superior performance in the earthquake and fire, especially Ernest L. Ransome's two buildings at Stanford University, and a constant stream of his articles and editorials in Architect and Engineer of California, changed the city's ordinances and gained national attention.

As of 1913 Leonard was in partnership with William Peyton Day. Together they produced the pamphlet The Concrete Bridge, showing examples and analyses of Leonard's work. In 1916 Day left to form the noted San Francisco firm of Weeks and Day.

Leonard would engineer about 20 buildings in post-1906 San Francisco, become increasing involved in building inspection, and ultimately design about 45 bridges in California.

== Work ==
Leonard's work includes:

- Virginia Street Bridge, Reno, Nevada, 1905 (demolished in 2016)
- Clune's Auditorium (aka Temple Auditorium), Los Angeles, California, 1906 (demolished), with architect Charles Whittlesey
- Engineering for the Sheldon Building, San Francisco, 1906, for architect Benjamin Geer McDougall
- Fernbridge, over the Eel River south of Eureka, California, 1911 (unmodified, extant)
- Gianella Bridge on State Highway 32, a steel swing bridge (one of Leonard's few steel designs) spanning the Sacramento River between Glenn and Butte Counties California, 1911 (demolished 1987)
- Van Duzen Bridge, spanning Van Duzen River at State Highway 36, Carlotta vicinity, Humboldt County, California, 1922 (demolished)
- Chili Bar Bridge, spanning South Fork of American River at State Highway 193, Placerville vicinity, El Dorado County, California, 1922 (demolished)
- Honcut Bridge, spanning South Honcut Creek at Honcut Road, Loma Rica, Yuba County, California, 1914 (demolished)
