= Virginia Street Bridge =

- U.S. National Register of Historic Places
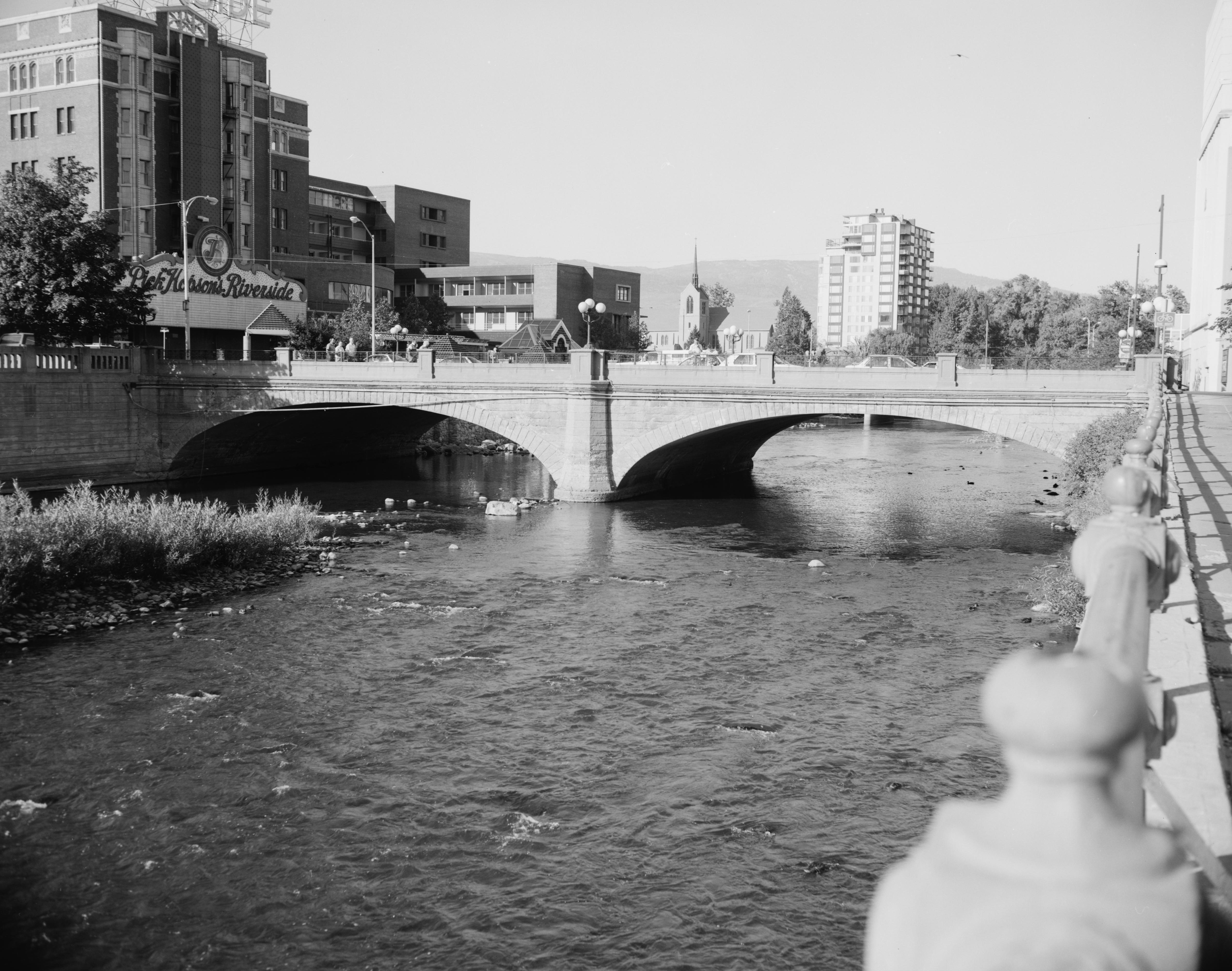
- The Virginia Street Bridge

- Location within Nevada Location within the United States
- Location: Reno, Nevada, U.S.
- Coordinates: 39°31′30″N 119°48′45″W
- Area: 0.5
- Built: 1905; 121 years ago
- Architect: John B. Leonard
- Demolished: June 8, 2015; 11 years ago
- NRHP reference No.: 80002471
- Added to NRHP: December 10, 1980; 45 years ago

The Virginia Street Bridge was a historic concrete double arch bridge in downtown Reno, Nevada, US, carrying Virginia Street across the Truckee River. It was added to the National Register of Historic Places in 1980. The bridge is sometimes referred to as the "Wedding Ring Bridge" or the "Bridge of Sighs".

In both 2002 and 2006, the bridge was listed as one of the "Eleven Most Endangered Historic Places in Nevada" by Preserve Nevada, a historic preservation organization partnered with the University of Nevada, Las Vegas (UNLV).

Due to structural and flood control concerns, the bridge was replaced in 2016.

== History ==
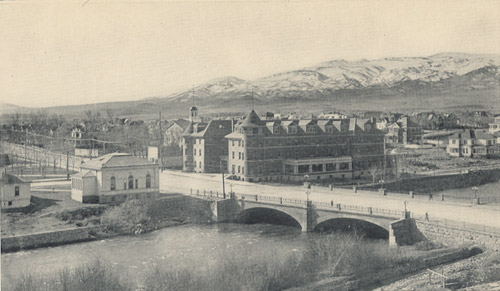
The Virginia Street Bridge, c. 1910.

Built in 1905, the current Virginia Street Bridge is the fifth in a series of bridges to have been built in downtown Reno. The first was a wooden bridge built in 1860 by Charles W. Fuller and was hence called Fuller's Crossing. After it was destroyed by a flood, a second bridge, a toll bridge, was built and sold to Myron Lake in 1861, although in 1867 it was also destroyed by a flood. Even though it was replaced by yet another bridge, it became unneeded after the arrival of the Transcontinental Railroad. In 1877, the Washoe County authorized the creation of a new tied-arch bridge made of iron. In 1905, the iron bridge was moved and the most long-lived bridge, designed by San Francisco architect John B. Leonard, was built by Cotton Brothers and Company of Oakland, California.

== Legend ==
Legend has it that newly divorced women would, after exiting the Washoe County Courthouse, stand on the Virginia Street Bridge and cast their wedding rings into the Truckee River below. Hence, the bridge became known as the main symbol of Reno, which was called the "Divorce Capital of the World" beginning in 1906. Over the years, salvage divers have found actual rings, according to archivist Guy Rocha.

A scene depicting this takes place in the 1939 film Reno. In the 1961 film The Misfits, Marilyn Monroe considers tossing her wedding ring from the Virginia Street Bridge, but decides against it.

== See also ==
- List of bridges documented by the Historic American Engineering Record in Nevada
- Fernbridge, a similar bridge near Ferndale, California also designed by Leonard
- Streetcars in Reno, Nevada, which utilized the bridge between 1905 and 1919
