= Hospital Rock (Three Rivers, California) =

Archaeological site in California, United States

- U.S. National Register of Historic Places
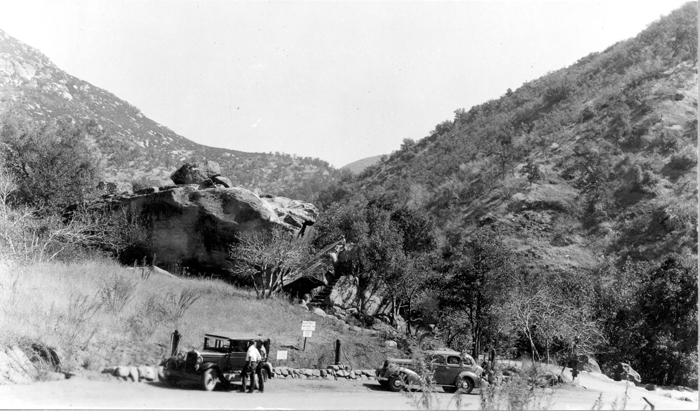
- Hospital Rock in Sequoia National Park

- Location within California Location within the United States
- Nearest city: Three Rivers, California
- Area: 2.2 acres (0.89 ha)
- NRHP reference No.: 77000122
- Added to NRHP: August 29, 1977

Hospital Rock is a large quartzite rock in Sequoia National Park, located just off of the Generals Highway, on the Middle Fork of the Kaweah River.

== History ==
Hospital Rock was once home to 500 Potwisha Native Americans. Archaeological evidence shows settlement as early as 1350, and bedrock mortar sites and pictographs remain. The Native Americans mostly used this site in the winter months. In 1860, Hale Tharp and his brother-in-law, John Swanson, were exploring the Giant Forest when Swanson sustained an injury to his leg. Swanson was transported to the locale where the injury was treated by local Native Americans. Hale Tharp gave the spot its name after a second similar incident. In 1873, James Everton recovered from a gunshot wound at the site. He had been injured by a shotgun snare set to trap bear.

== Visiting ==
Hospital Rock is a public archaeological site that now features a parking lot and picnic area. A short trail was built by the Civilian Conservation Corps that leads to a waterfall nearby.

Hospital Rock gallery
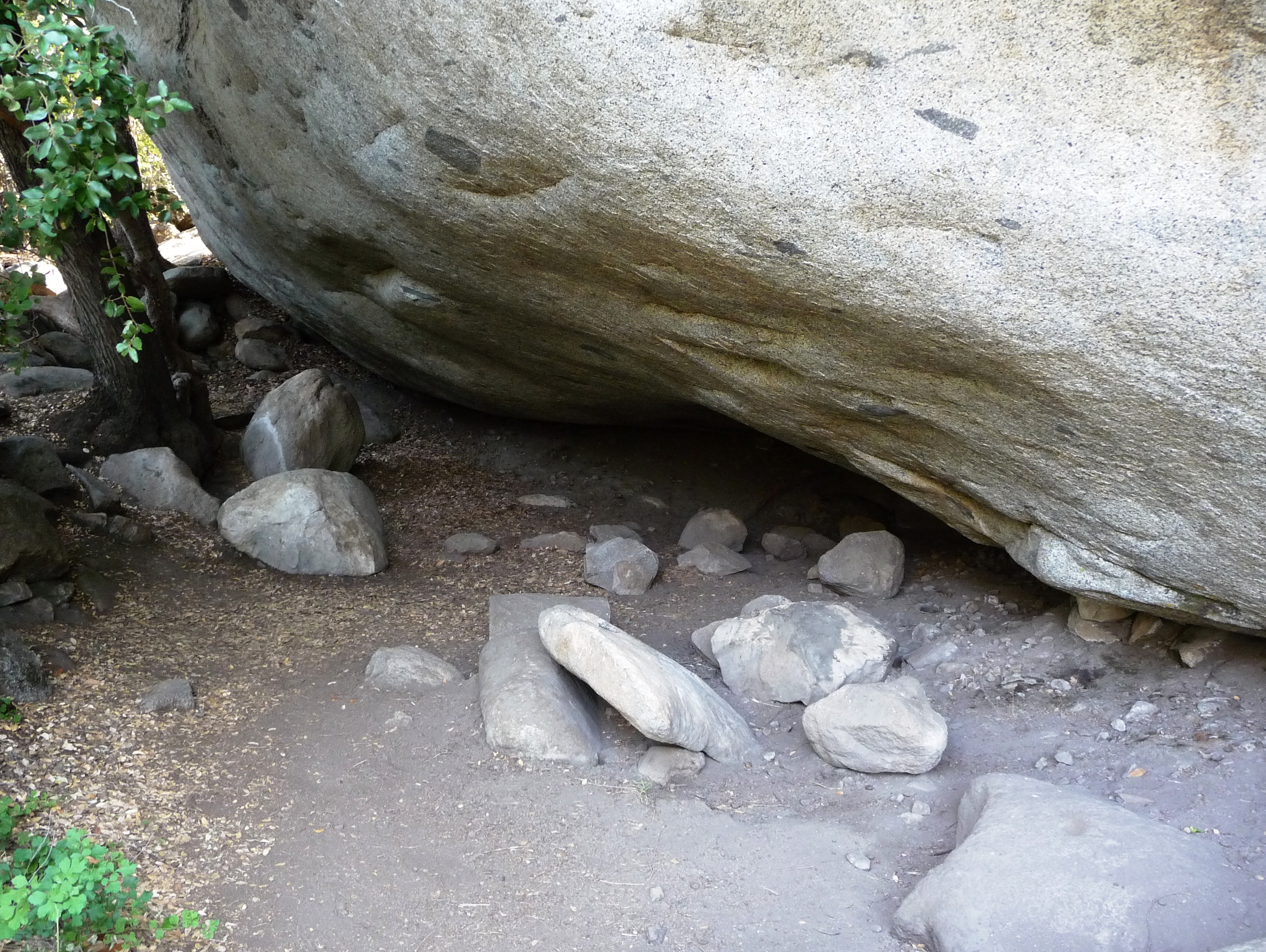
Sheltered area underneath Hospital Rock

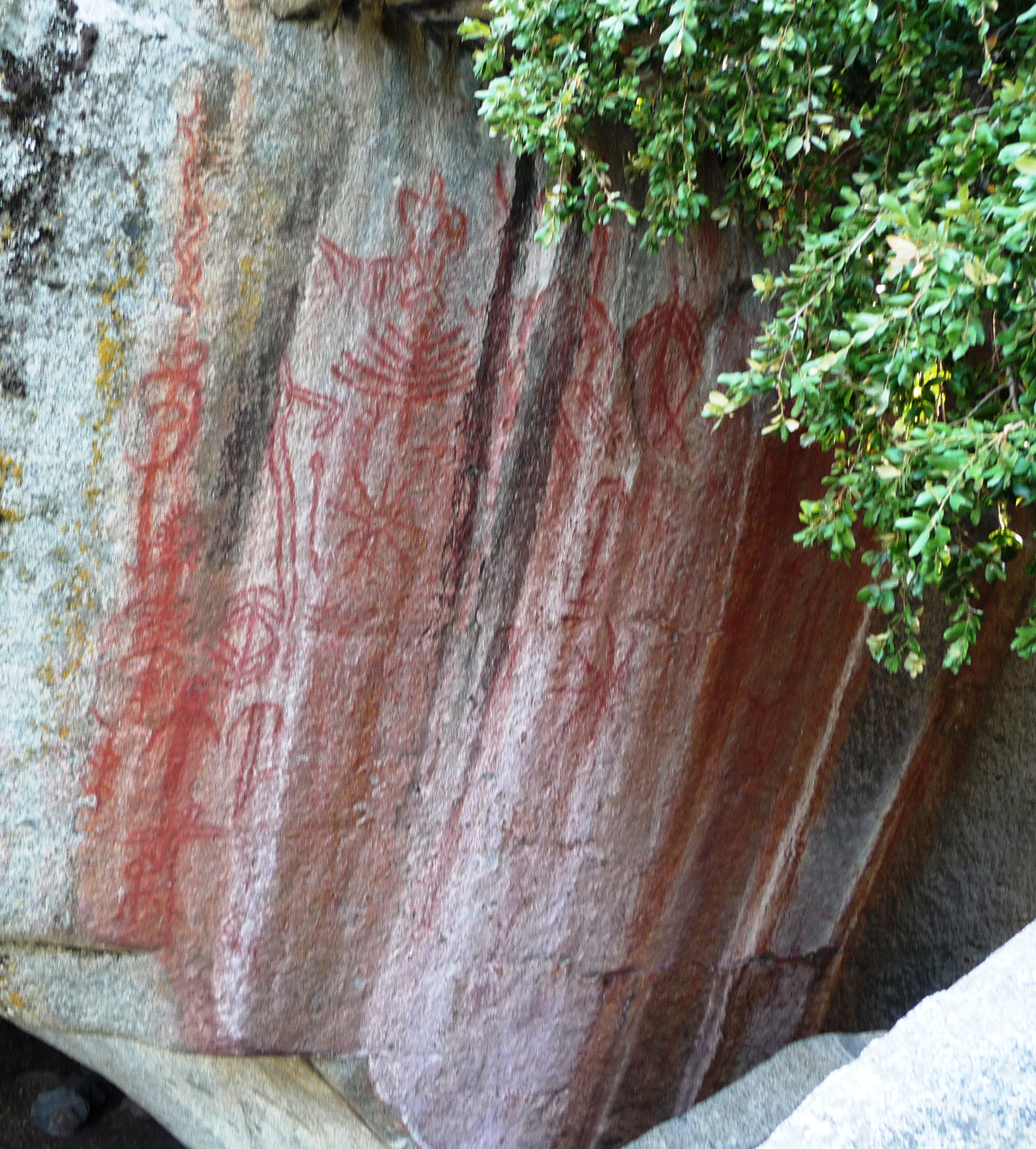
Hospital Rock pictographs

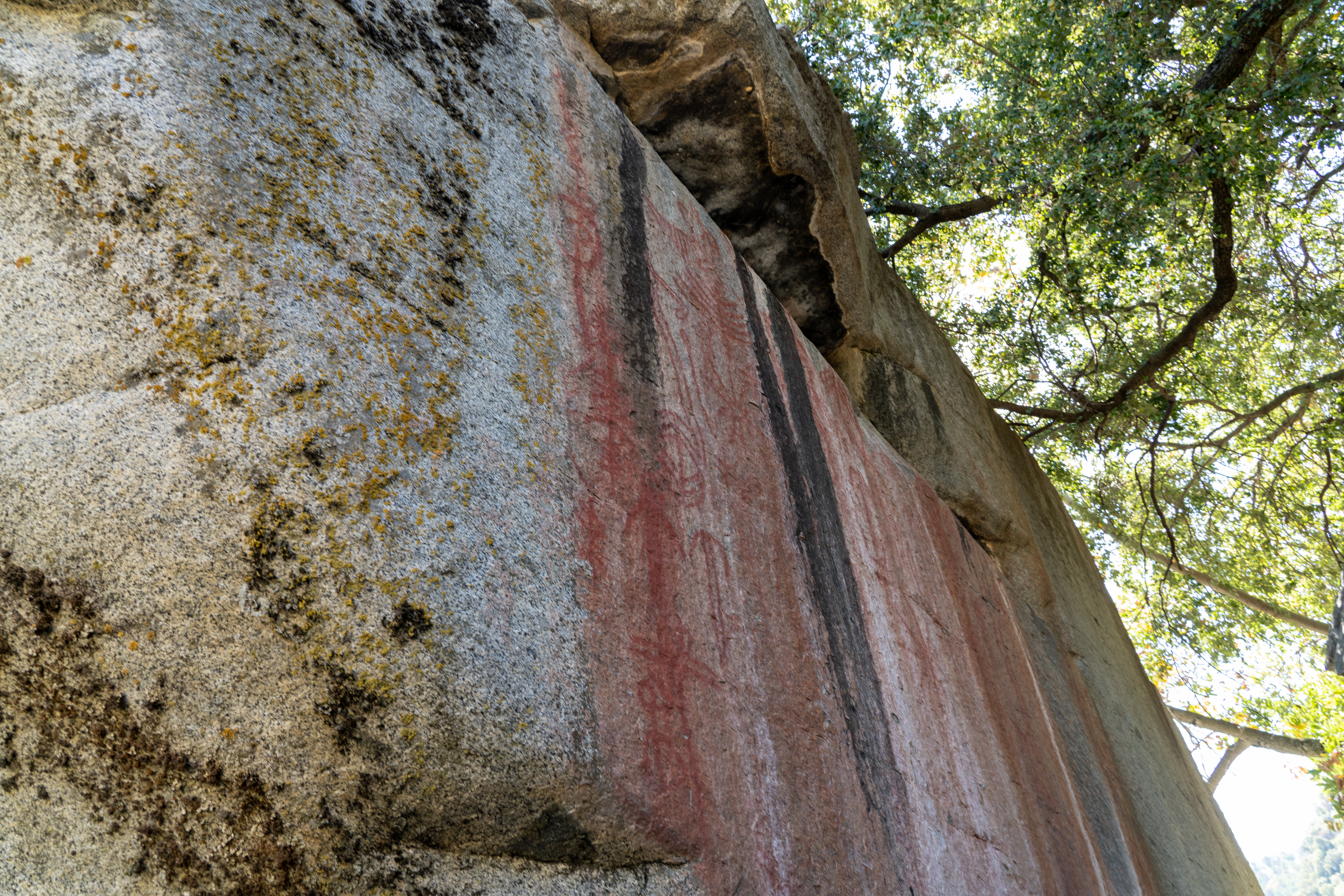

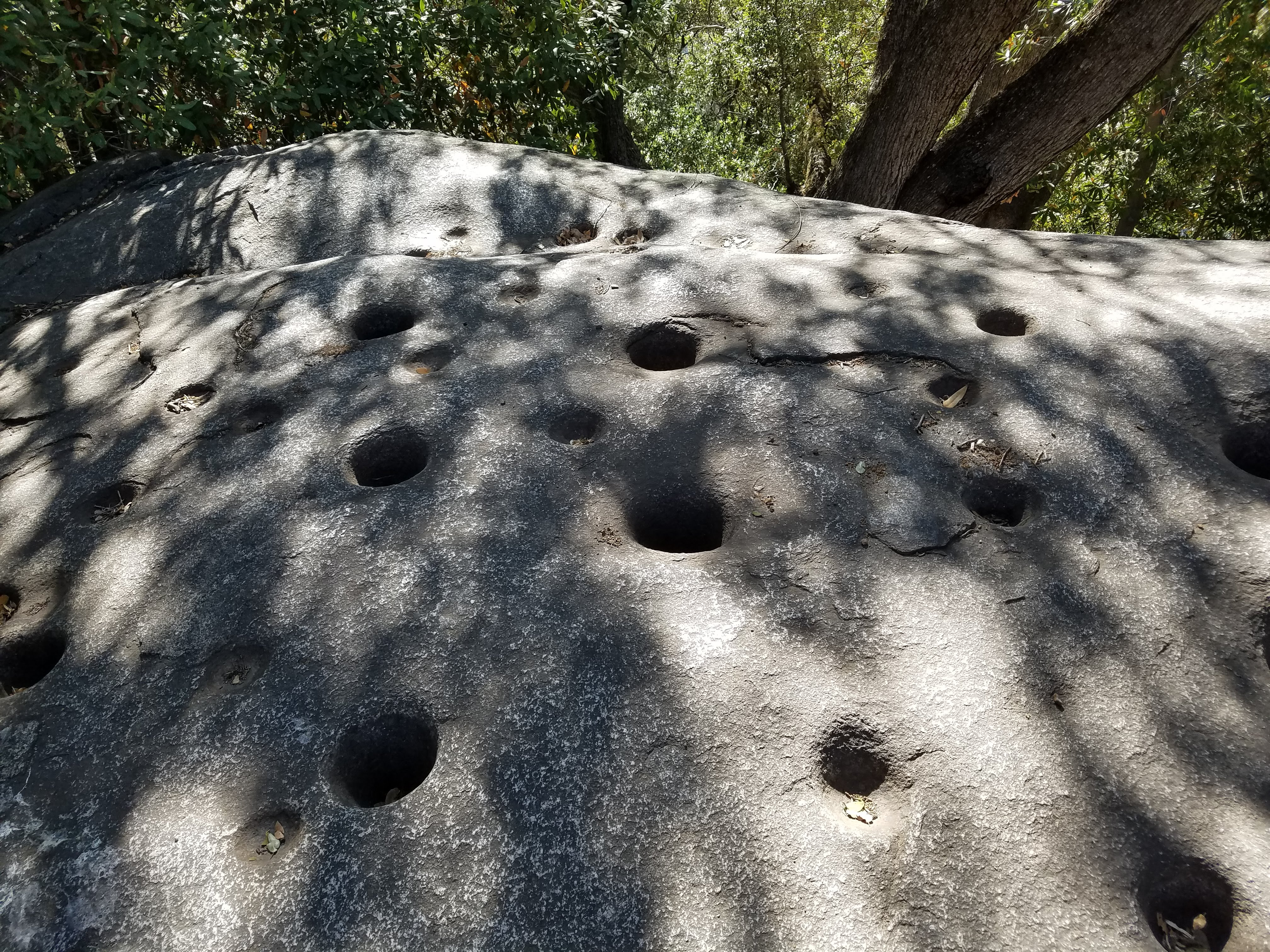
Bedrock mortars next to Hospital Rock, once used for grinding acorns
