= Generals Highway =

Highway in California

- Generals Highway highlighted in green

Route information
- Maintained by U.S. Forest Service and NPS
- Length: 32.5 mi (52.3 km)

Major junctions
- South end: SR 198 in Sequoia National Park
- North end: SR 180 in Kings Canyon National Park

Location
- Country: United States
- State: California
- Counties: Tulare

Highway system
- Forest Highway System; State highways in California; Interstate; US; State; Scenic; History; Pre‑1964; Unconstructed; Deleted; Freeways

The Generals Highway is a highway that connects State Route 180 and State Route 198 through Sequoia National Park, Sequoia National Forest, Giant Sequoia National Monument, and Kings Canyon National Park in the Sierra Nevada of California. As the road goes through national parks and monuments, the highway is primarily maintained by the federal government instead of a California State Highway controlled by Caltrans.

== Route description ==
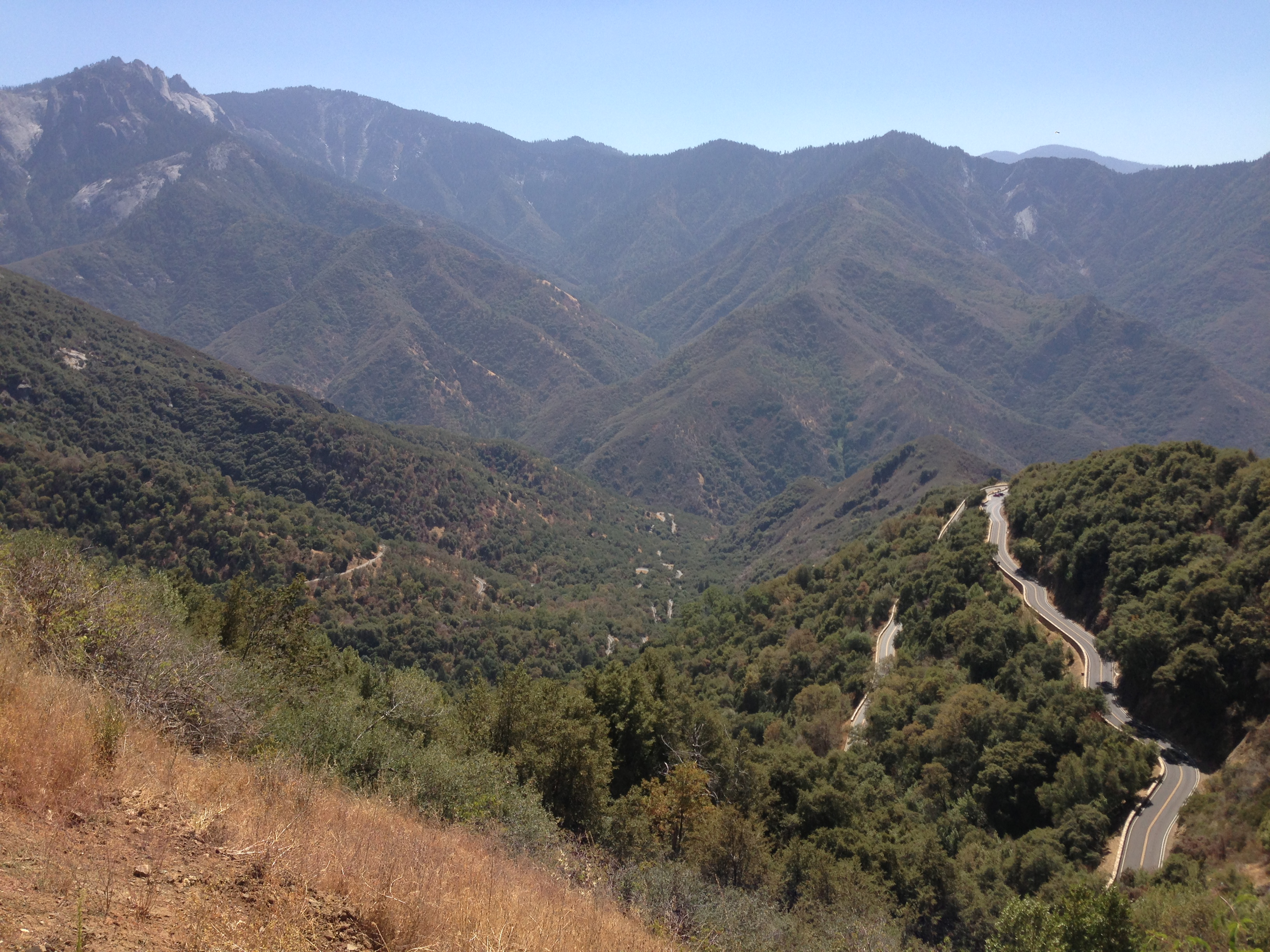
Switchbacks on Generals Highway

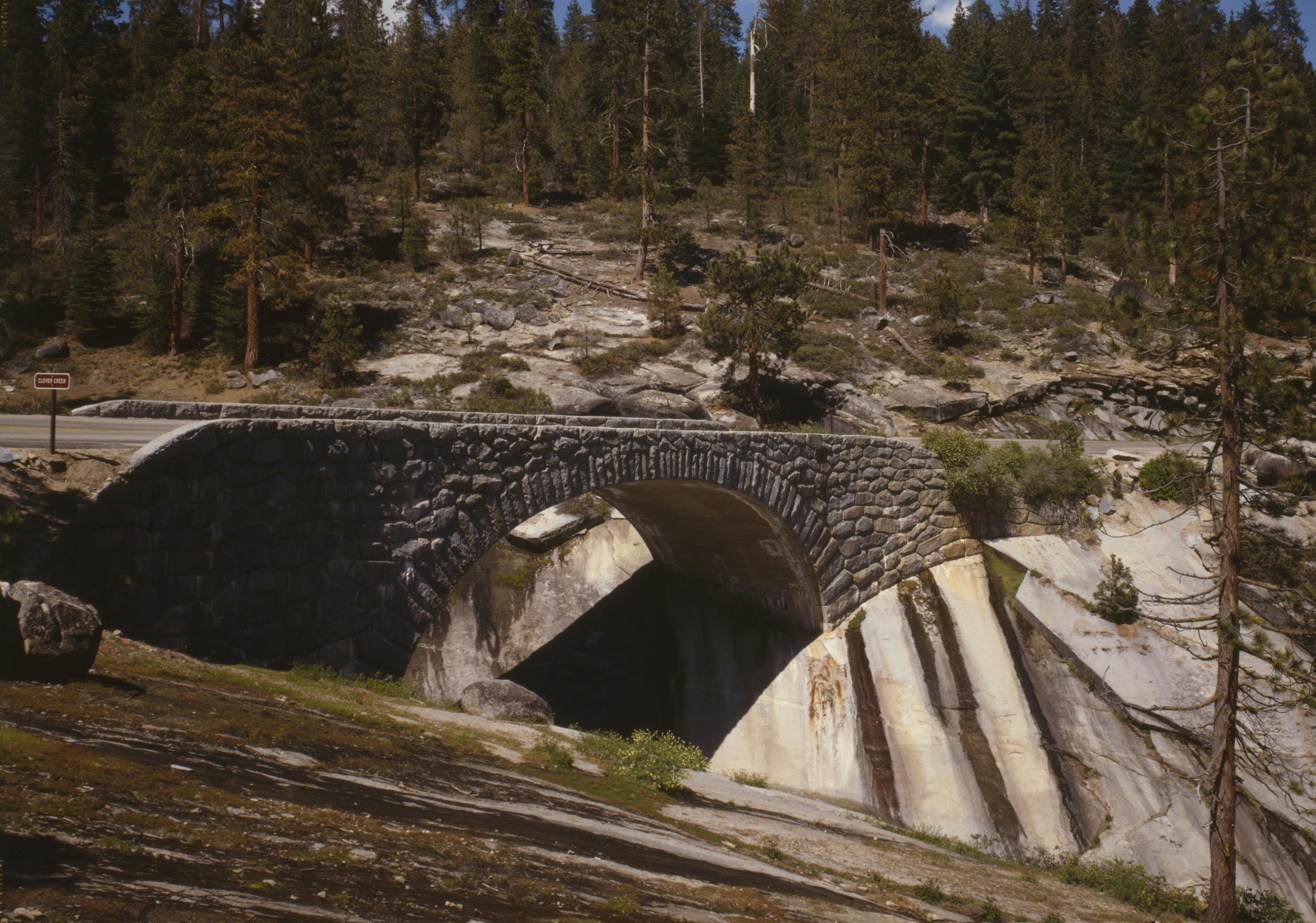
Clover Creek Bridge spanning Clover Creek on Generals Highway

It is named after two of the largest and most famous Giant Sequoia trees, the General Sherman and General Grant trees. The highway is notoriously steep, narrow, winding, and difficult to drive, especially its southern section from Hospital Rock to Giant Forest within Sequoia National Park. This section also consists of numerous switchbacks, and has a speed limit of 10 MPH. Regulations restrict the length of vehicles—they must not exceed 40 feet (12 m), although vehicles longer than 22 feet (6.7 m) are not recommended to use the road between Potwisha Campground and Giant Forest Museum. Furthermore, the highway north of Lodgepole campground generally closes due to snow conditions, and is not plowed between the Friday after January 1 and the third Friday in March.

The Generals Highway begins as a continuation of SR 198, where the state highway legally ends at the southern boundary of Sequoia National Park, although some commercially produced maps may still show the Generals Highway as part of SR 198. The road travels northeast along the middle fork of the Kaweah River and enters Sequoia National Park through the Indian Head Entrance. Near the Hospital Rock turnout, the road turns north and goes through several turns before straightening out and continuing northeast, passing near the General Sherman Tree. At Lodgepole Bridge, the road turns west before later turning north. Generals Highway leaves Sequoia National Park through the North Entrance, entering Sequoia National Forest. The road continues northwest through Giant Sequoia National Monument before traveling along the northern border of Kings Canyon National Park, briefly entering it before terminating at SR 180.

== History ==
Two of the stone bridges on the highway are listed on the National Register of Historic Places.

== Major intersections ==
The entire route is in Tulare County.

| Location | mi | km | Destinations | Notes |
|---|---|---|---|---|
| Sequoia National Park | 0.00 | 0.00 | SR 198 west – Visalia, Hanford | Continuation beyond the Sequoia National Park southern boundary |
| Sequoia National Park | 0.30 | 0.48 | Ash Mountain Entrance Station; park fee or pass required for entry | |
| Kings Canyon National Park | 32.5 | 52.3 | SR 180 – Fresno, Grant Grove Village, Cedar Grove | |
1.000 mi = 1.609 km; 1.000 km = 0.621 mi: Tolled

== See also ==
- Avenue of the Giants
- U.S. Route 199 (Redwood Highway)
