= Gianella Bridge =

- U.S. National Register of Historic Places
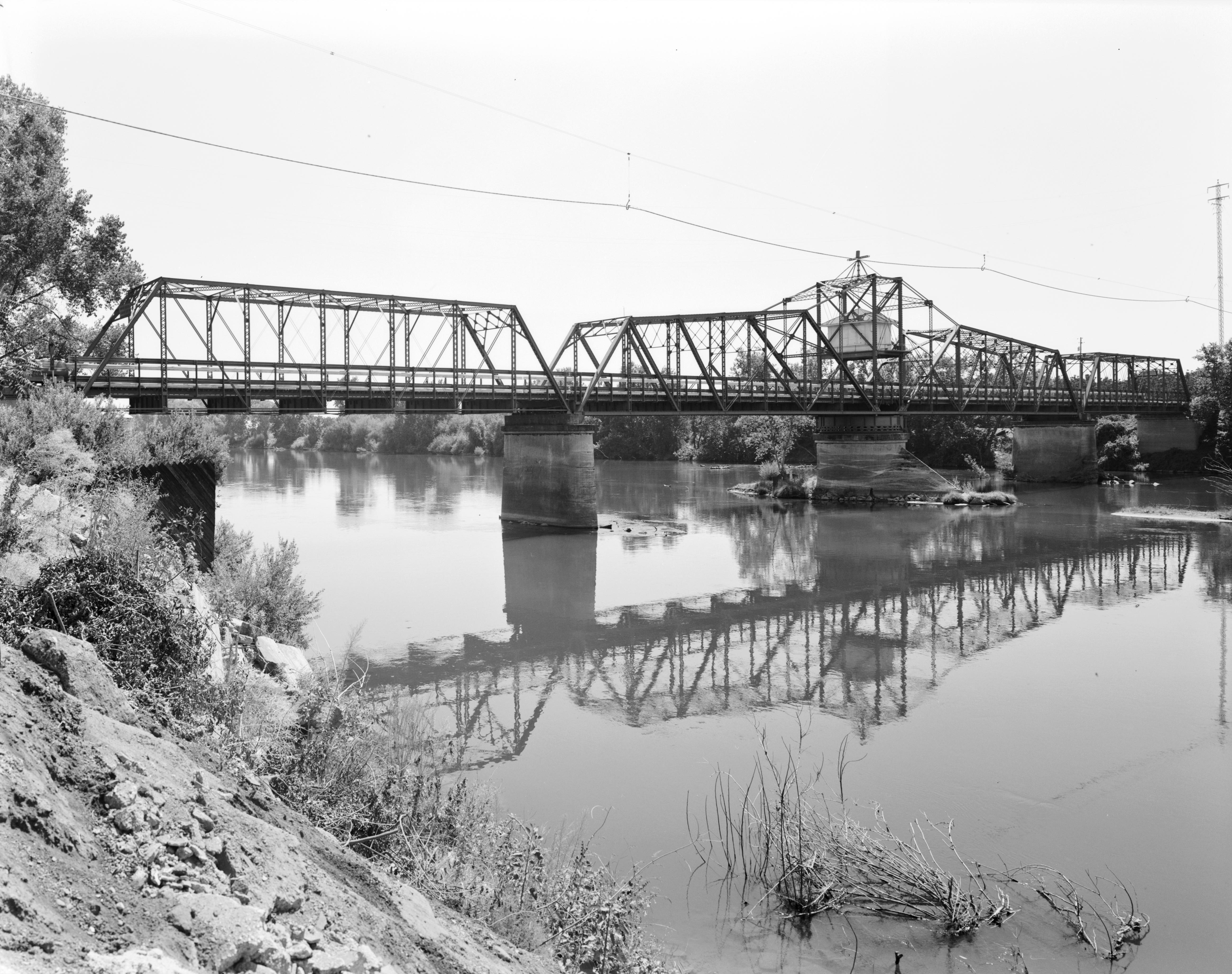

- Location within California Location within the United States
- Location: State Route 32, Hamilton City, California
- Coordinates: 39°45′4″N 121°59′46″W
- Area: less than one acre (0.4 ha)
- Built: 1937
- Built by: Cotton Brothers & Co., Contractors; Leonard, John B.
- NRHP reference No.: 82004614
- Added to NRHP: July 8, 1982

The Gianella Bridge was a swing bridge that brought California State Route 32 across the Sacramento River at Hamilton City, California, between Glenn County and Butte County. It was built in 1908–1911 by Cotton Brothers & Co., Contractors. Also known as Sacramento River Bridge at Hamilton City, it was listed on the National Register of Historic Places in 1982. The bridge was documented by the Historic American Engineering Record (HAER) in 1984. It was demolished in 1987 but remains NRHP-listed.

While a bridge was desired by both counties, there was disagreement about the location. Glenn County favored the Hamilton City location to support Hamilton, in Glenn County, and the sugar beet industry; Butte County favored a location closer to Chico, in Butte County. The deadlock was broken by influence of Swiss-born Vincenzo Gianella, a Butte County large landowner and sugar beet farmer.

It was replaced by a concrete highway bridge and was removed in 1987.

Nonetheless, the swing bridge remains listed on the NRHP as of 2013.

== See also ==
- List of bridges documented by the Historic American Engineering Record in California
